= John A. Macready =

American test pilot and aviator

John Arthur Macready
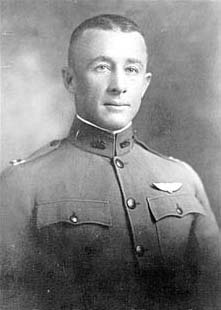
- John A. Macready
- Born: October 14, 1887; San Diego, California, US
- Died: September 15, 1979 (aged 91); Mariposa, California, US
- Military career
- Allegiance: United States of America
- Branch: United States Army Air Forces
- Service years: 1917–1926, 1942–1948
- Rank: Colonel
- Conflicts: World War I World War II
- Awards: Distinguished Flying Cross; Legion of Merit; Mackay Trophy

John Arthur Macready (October 14, 1887 – September 15, 1979) was an American test pilot and aviator. He is the only three-time recipient of the Mackay Trophy, and they were awarded in three consecutive years: once for altitude flight, once for transcontinental flight, and once for an endurance flight of 36 hours, 4 minutes and 32 seconds.

== History ==
Born in San Diego, California, Macready received a bachelor's degree in economics from Stanford University in 1912. He enlisted in the Army in 1917, earning his pilot's wings at Rockwell Field, in San Diego. In 1923, Macready graduated from the Air Service Engineering School located at McCook Field in Dayton, Ohio. He quickly rose to the position of flight instructor at the Army Pilot School at Brooks Field, Texas. While based at Brooks Field, Lieutenant Macready wrote a basic flight manual for student pilots, The All Thru System of Flying Instructions. The book became the U.S. military's basic flight manual during the early years of aviation.

== McCook Field ==
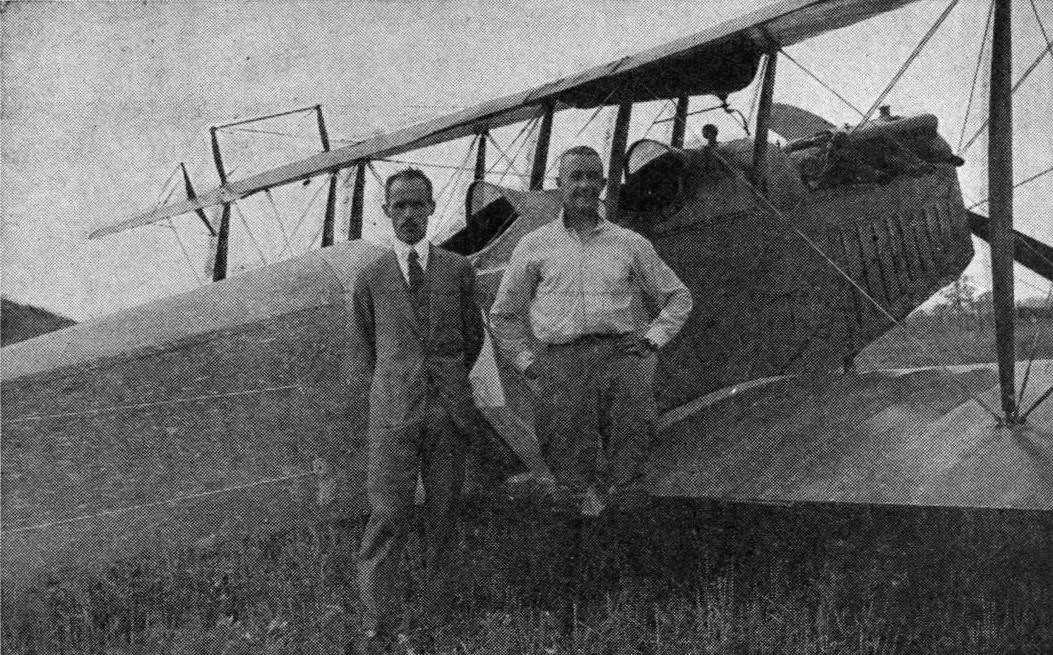
Lieutenant Macready (right) and McCook Field engineer E. Dormoy (left) in front of the first crop duster airplane

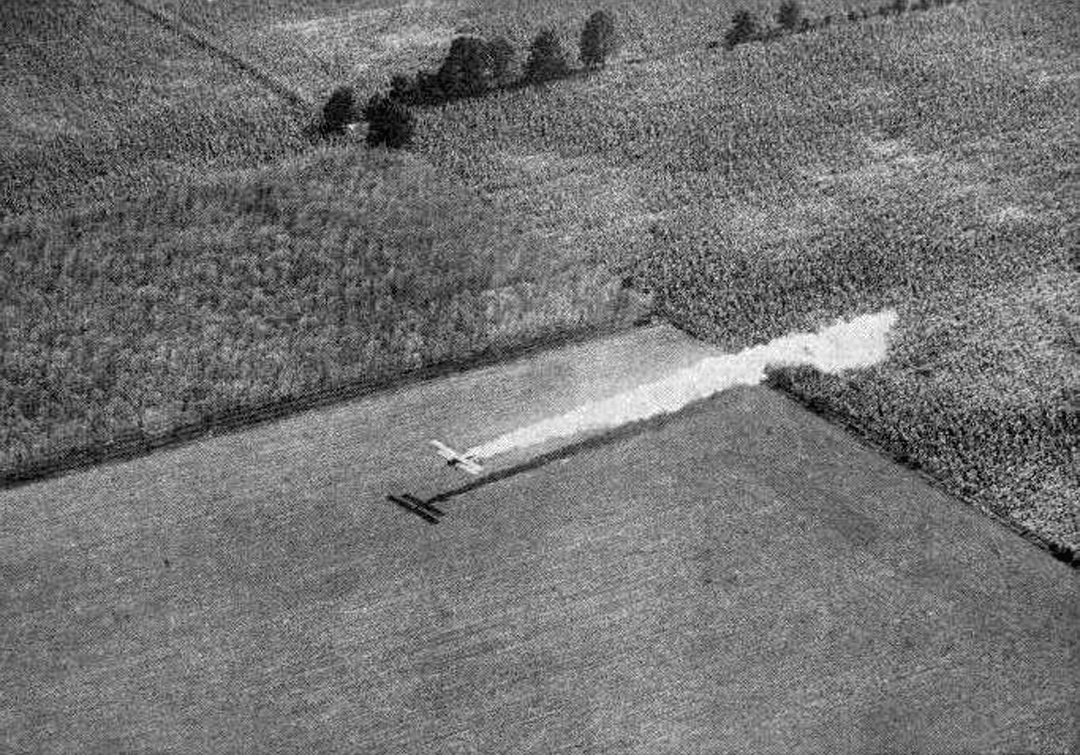
World's first crop dusting experiment, on August 3, 1921

In 1918, Lieutenant Macready was assigned to McCook Field, the Army Signal Corps' new experimental test field in Dayton, Ohio. On 3 August 1921, Lieutenant Macready became the first person to test fly an experimental aerial application system for spraying pesticides from an aircraft, flying the world's first "crop duster".

In 1921, he set an altitude record of 34,509 feet (10,518 m) feet for which he was awarded the first of three consecutive Mackay trophies. On September 28, 1921, he climbed to 40,800 feet (12,400 m) in an experimental Packard-Le Père LUSAC-11 biplane designed and modified at McCook Field with a special breathing apparatus to provide him oxygen during his ascent.

October 5, 1922 Macready and Lieutenant Oakley G. Kelly set a world endurance record of 35 hours, 18 minutes and 30 seconds.

On 2–3 May 1923 with Kelly, Macready made the first non-stop coast-to-coast flight, from Roosevelt Field, formerly Mitchell Field, 2.3 miles south-east of Mineola, Long Island, New York to Rockwell Field, North Island, San Diego, California, with a total flight time of 26 hours, 50 minutes and 48 seconds. En route, he made the first in-flight aircraft engine repair in Air Service history, replacing a defective voltage regulator switch while the single engine, high wing Fokker T-2 Liberty mono-plane churned westward. The flight also set a new distance record for a single cross-country flight, 2,625 miles.

At McCook, he also became the first pilot to bail out of a stricken aircraft at night. On 13 June 1924, while he was making a night airways flight from McCook Field to Columbus, Ohio and back, his engine died just as he was approaching Dayton. His first idea was to make an emergency landing, but the two flares he released failed to ignite. Even though no one had ever made an emergency jump at night, he decided to trust to his parachute and came down safely, though his parachute tangled in a tree and he required help to get to the ground.

== World War II ==
Macready was recalled to active duty in World War II. He served as a colonel and commanded several Army Air Force groups, as well as serving in North Africa as inspector general for the Twelfth Air Force. He retired from active duty in 1948.

== Mackay Trophy ==
Macready remains the only person to win the Mackay Trophy three times. The trophy is awarded for the year's greatest accomplishment in aviation by an American pilot. Lieutenant Macready won the trophy in three consecutive years.

- 1921 - The trophy was awarded for a series of high altitude test flights at McCook Field using the XC05A involving the first use of supplemental oxygen. The flights established a world record altitude of 40,800 feet; the previous record being 39,596–ft set by a French aviator Callizo.
- 1922 - The trophy was awarded for a flight on 5–6 October 1922. Taking off on 5 October, an aircraft piloted by Macready and Lieutenant Oakley G. Kelly established a world flight endurance record of 35 hours 18.5 minutes over San Diego, California. This, and later endurance flights led to the development of the world's first air-to-air refueling system.
- 1923 - The trophy was awarded for the first non-stop coast-to-coast flight. The flight began on 2 May 1923, and concluded on 3 May. Macready and Kelly took off from Roosevelt Field, New York in a modified Fokker T-2 loaded with gasoline. The pair landed at Rockwell Field, in San Diego, California having completed the first nonstop U.S. transcontinental flight in an official time of 26 hours, 50 minutes and 38 3/5 seconds.

== Honors ==
Macready was enshrined in the National Aviation Hall of Fame in 1968. In 1976, he was inducted into the International Air & Space Hall of Fame.

== Media ==
He is the subject of a book written by his daughter Sally Macready Wallace.(see External links EarlyAviators)

Preceded by Joseph Sadi-Lecointe	Human altitude record 1926-1927	Succeeded by Hawthorne C. Gray
