= Operation Power Flite =

US Air Force circumnavigation mission

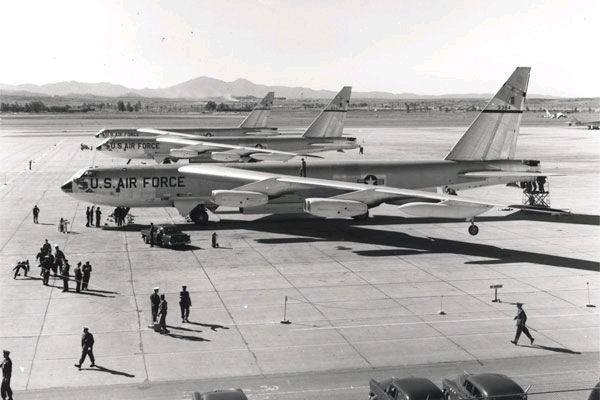
Three B-52Bs of the 93rd Bomb Wing prepare to return to Castle Air Force Base, California, after their record-setting round-the-world non-stop flight.

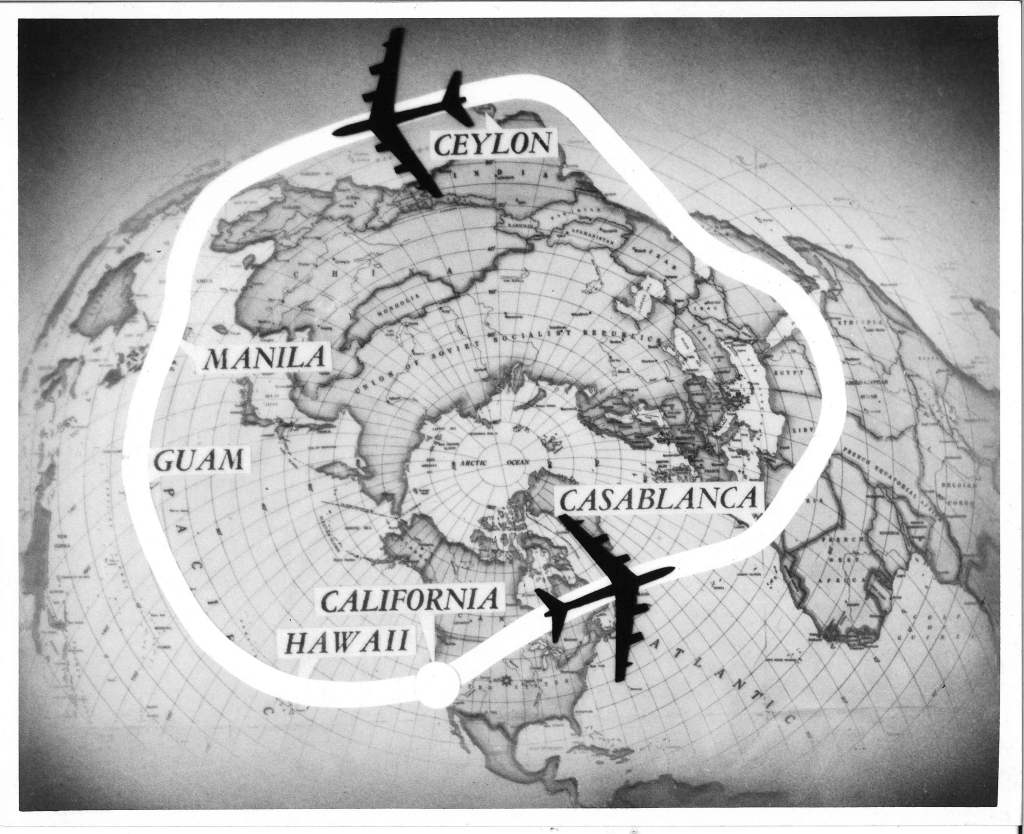
Route of the first round-the-world nonstop flight by a jet airplane.

Operation Power Flite was a United States Air Force mission in which three Boeing B-52 Stratofortresses became the first jet aircraft to circle the world nonstop, when they made the journey in January 1957 in 45 hours and 19 minutes, using in-flight refueling to stay aloft. The mission was intended to demonstrate that the United States had the ability to drop a hydrogen bomb anywhere in the world.

== Around the world ==
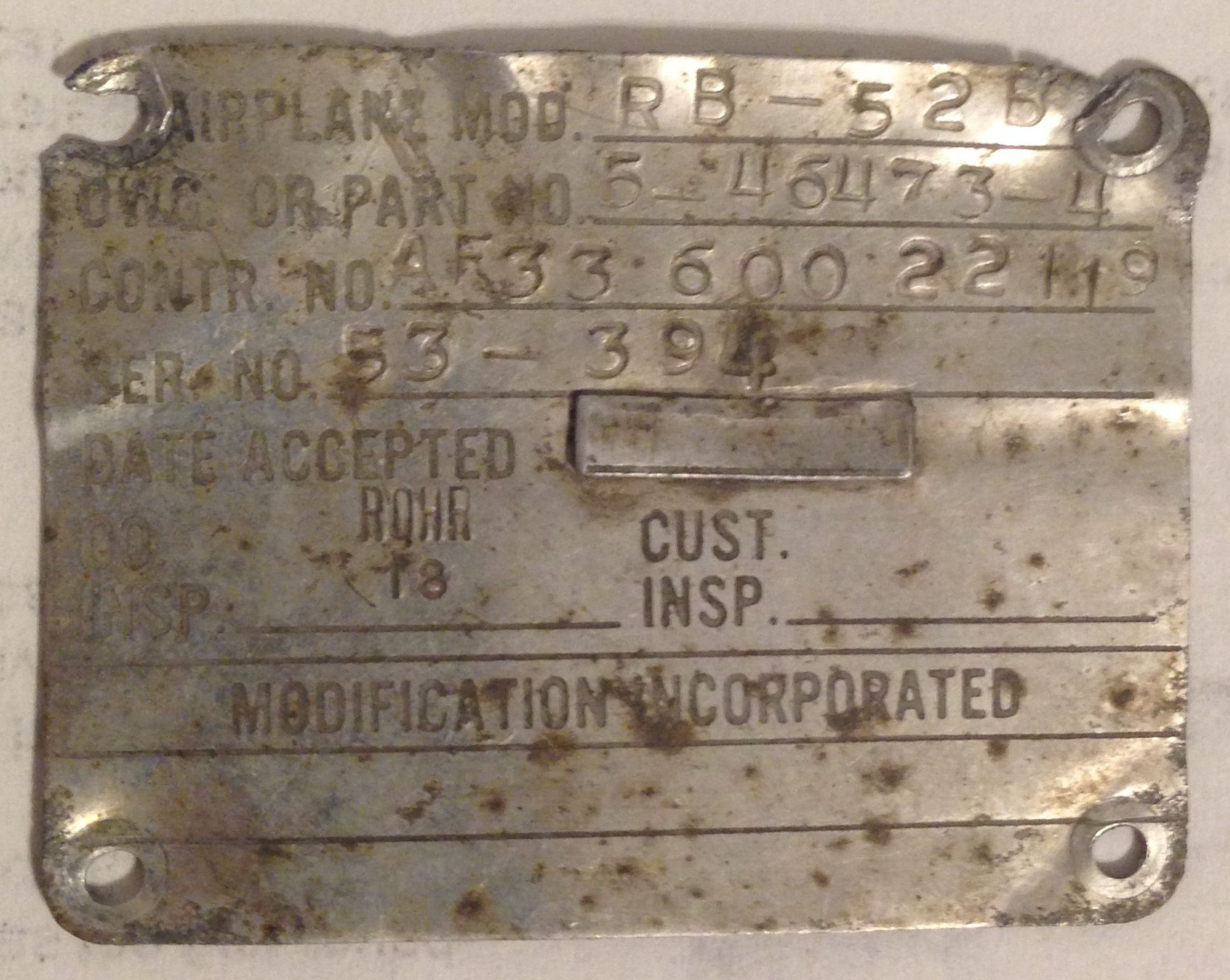
Data plate from one of the B-52s that took part in the mission

Led by Major General Archie J. Old, Jr. as flight commander, five B-52B aircraft of the 93rd Bombardment Wing of the 15th Air Force took off from Castle Air Force Base in California on January 16, 1957, at 1:00 PM, with two of the planes flying as spares. Old was aboard Lucky Lady III (serial number 53-0394) which was commanded by Lieutenant Colonel James H. Morris, who had flown as the co-pilot aboard the Lucky Lady II when it made the world's first non-stop circumnavigation in 1949. Heading east, one of the planes was unable to refuel from a Boeing KC-97 Stratofreighter and was forced to land at Goose Bay Air Base in Labrador. The second spare refueled with the rest of the planes over Casablanca, Morocco and then split off as planned to land at RAF Brize Norton in England.

After a mid-air refueling rendezvous over Saudi Arabia, the planes followed the coast of India to Sri Lanka and then made a simulated bombing drop south of the Malay Peninsula before heading towards the next air refueling rendezvous over Manila and Guam. The three planes continued across the Pacific Ocean and landed at March Air Force Base near Riverside, California on January 18 after flying for a total of 45 hours and 19 minutes, with the lead plane landing at 10:19 AM and the other two planes following each other separated by 80 seconds. The 24,325 miles (39,147 km) flight was completed at an average speed of 525 miles per hour (845 km/h) and was completed in less than half the time required by Lucky Lady II when it made the first non-stop circumnavigation in 1949. General Curtis LeMay was among the 1,000 on hand to greet the three planes, and he awarded all 27 crew members the Distinguished Flying Cross. Though Old called the flight "a routine training mission," the Air Force emphasized that the mission demonstrated its "capability to drop a hydrogen bomb anywhere in the world."

The National Aeronautic Association recognized the 93rd Bombardment Wing as recipient of the Mackay Trophy for 1957.

== Crews ==
=== Crew No. 1 ===
- Maj. Gen. Archie Old - Mission Commander
- Lt. Col. James H. Morris - Aircraft Commander
- Capt. Ernest E. Campbell - Co-pilot
- Capt. Rene M. Woog - Navigator
- Maj. Albert F. Wooten - Navigator
- Maj. Anthony P Dzierski - Navigator
- Capt. Quintis L Hinkley - Electronic Countermeasures
- M/Sgt. Carl H Ballew - Tail Gunner
- T/Sgt. Donovan W. Higginbotham - Crew Chief

=== Crew No. 2 ===
- Capt. Charles W. Fink - Aircraft Commander
- Lt. Col. Marcus L. Hill Jr. - Co-pilot
- Capt. Jay G. Bachman - Co-pilot
- Capt. Cyril H. Dingwell - Navigator
- Capt. Michael Stevens - Navigator
- Capt. Edward M Hollacher - Navigator
- 1st Lt. Joseph B. Tyra - Electronic Countermeasures
- S/Sgt. James L. Bushboom - Tail Gunner
- T/Sgt. Joseph D. Armstrong - Crew Chief

=== Crew No. 3 ===
- Maj. George C. Kalebaugh - Aircraft Commander
- Maj. Salvador E. Felices - Co-pilot
- Capt. James H. Walsh Jr. - Co-pilot
- Capt. Gerald A. Rush - Radar Observer
- 1st Lt. Byrum W. Cooper - Navigator
- Capt. Alfonso C. Toler - Navigator
- Maj. Billie M. Beardsley - Electronic Countermeasures
- A/1c - Eugene N. Preiss - Tail Gunner
- T/Sgt. Albert Romero - Crew Chief

== Other Lucky Ladies ==
Lucky Lady III was one of three similarly named aircraft, each of which was part of an historic circumnavigation on behalf of the United States Air Force:

Lucky Lady I was one of two Boeing B-29 Superfortresses that made a round-the-world trip in July/August 1948, flying from and back to Davis-Monthan Air Force Base in Arizona, completing the 20,000 miles (32,000 km) flight in 15 days after making eight stops along the way and flying for 103 hours and 50 minutes.

Lucky Lady II was a Boeing B-50 Superfortress of the 43rd Bombardment Group with an additional fuel tank added in the bomb bay to provide additional range. It became the first airplane to circumnavigate the globe nonstop, when it made the journey in 94 hours and one minute in 1949, assisted by refueling the plane in flight.

== See also ==
- Lucky Lady II - the first-ever non-stop around-the-world airplane flight, 1949
- Coronet Bat - B-1B around-the-world simulated bombing mission, 1995
