= Gerald Goodfellow =

United States Air Force general

Gerald V. Goodfellow
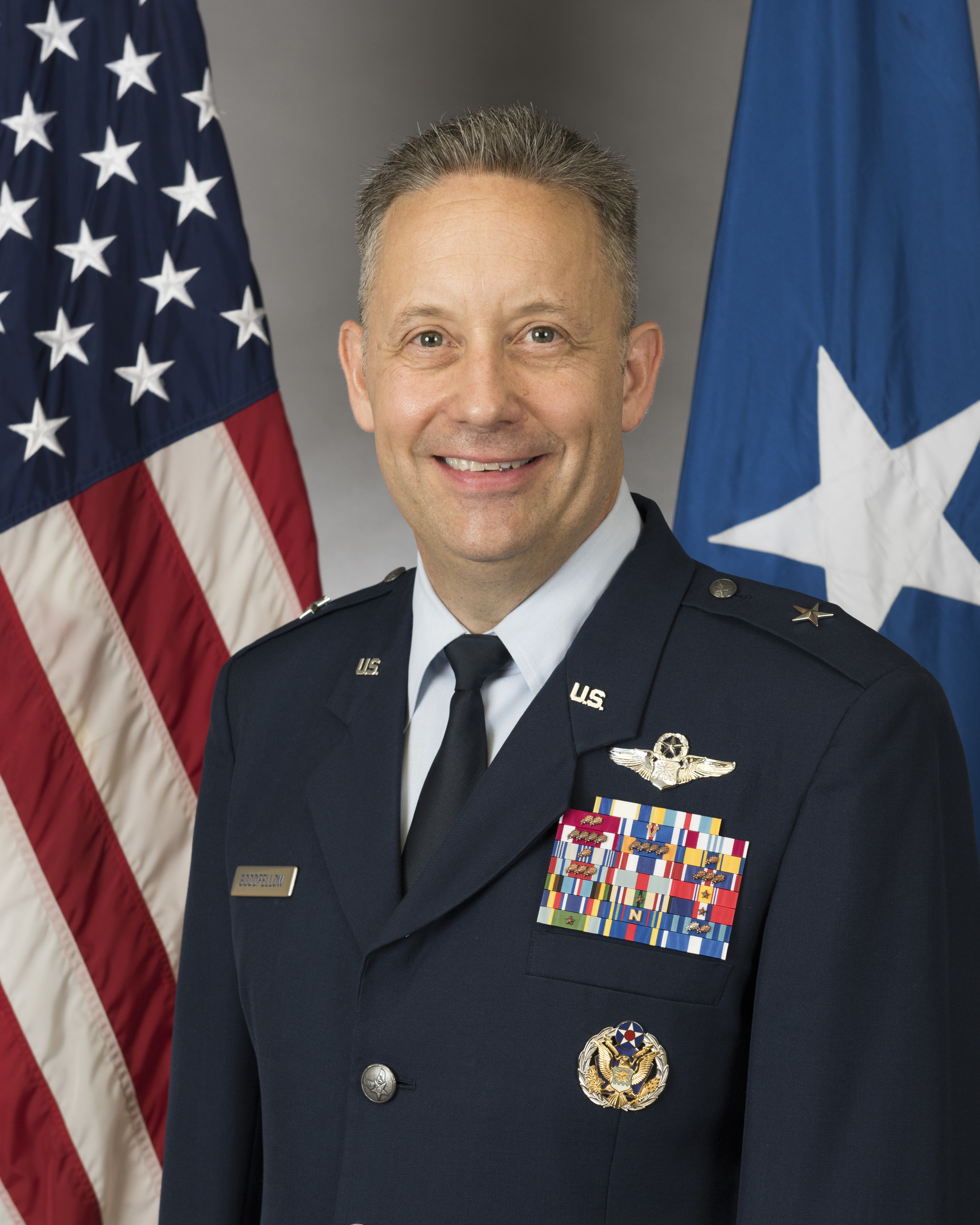
- Military career
- Allegiance: United States
- Branch: United States Air Force
- Service years: 1989–2019
- Rank: Brigadier general
- Commands: Squadron Officer School; 12th Flying Training Wing; 7th Operations Group
- Awards: Distinguished Service Medal; Defense Superior Service Medal; Legion of Merit with two oak leaf clusters Distinguished Flying Cross with Valor; Mackay Trophy
- Other work: Executive Director, Louisiana Tech Research Institute

Gerald V. Goodfellow is a retired United States Air Force brigadier general, and the current Chief Executive Officer of the Small Business Consulting Corporation. Goodfellow was commissioned in 1989 through the University of New Mexico Air Force ROTC program. Goodfellow has flown a wide variety of military aircraft, but primarily the B-1 Bomber. In 1995, Goodfellow flew a non-stop flight around the world that set two world records. For that flight Goodfellow won the Mackay Trophy for the U.S. Air Force's most meritorious flight of the year. Goodfellow has commanded at flight, squadron, group, and wing levels, and was the Commander and Commandant at the U.S. Air Force Squadron Officer College. In his last assignment he was director of Strategic Plans, Programs and Requirements, Headquarters Air Force Global Strike Command, Barksdale Air Force Base, Louisiana. Prior to that, he was the Director of the Nuclear Enterprise Directorate at the Defense Threat Reduction Agency.

== Air Force career ==
Goodfellow completed undergraduate navigator training at Mather Air Force Base in 1990 with follow-on training at the KC-135 Combat Crew Training Squadron at Castle Air Force Base in 1991. In July 1991, Goodfellow reported to the 917th Air Refueling Squadron at Dyess Air Force Base as a KC-135 navigator. In October 1993 Goodfellow was chosen for transition to the B-1 Bomber as an offensive systems officer. After retraining Goodfellow joined the 9th Bomb Squadron.

While with the 9th Bomb Squadron, Goodfellow was chosen to participate in a mission called Coronet Bat. During the mission, two B-1s flew around the world non-stop with air refueling and practice bombing missions hitting ranges in Europe, Asia, and North America. This mission set a world aviation record for "Nonstop Speed Around-the-World with refueling in flight". Coronet Bat was deemed the U.S. Air Force's most meritorious flight of 1995, earning the members of the flight crews the Mackay Trophy.

From 1997 to 2002, Goodfellow served in a variety of capacities at Ellsworth Air Force Base. He served as chief, training flight; chief, standardization and evaluation; and flight commander as well as chief weapon systems officer, wing standardization and evaluation, and executive officer, 28th Bomb Wing. During his service at Ellsworth, Goodfellow deployed with the 77th Expeditionary Bomb Squadron, 2nd Air Expeditionary Group to RAF Fairford in support of Operation Allied Force. During the first B-1 Bomber combat mission Goodfellow was serving as the offensive systems officer. After attacking the first target of their mission, the bomb bay doors became stuck open. Goodfellow was able to clear the error causing the malfunction, but the doors still would not close. The crew decided to continue the mission to hit their second target due to its high priority, rather than returning to base for repairs. During the course of the mission the aircraft was targeted more than once by surface-to-air missiles, but was able to hit its second target and safely leave the area of operations. Despite being out of the combat zone, the mission still faced difficulties as the open bomb bay doors created excessive drag and depleted fuel below the level required to return to RAF Fairford. Plotting the most efficient path back to the base coupled with coordinating in-flight refueling allowed the crew to bring the aircraft back to England. Prior to landing, the aircraft was struck by lightning, blowing off a chuck of the horizontal stabilizer. Goodfellow was awarded the Distinguished Flying Cross with "V" Device for heroism. Goodfellow and the members of the crew were awarded the 1999 General Ira C. Eaker Award for an Outstanding Single Feat of Military Airmanship in the Eighth Air Force.

From June 2003 to May 2005, Goodfellow served as the chief of Wargaming Branch, Operational Plans and Joint Matters Directorate under the deputy chief of staff for air and space operations at the Headquarters of the U.S. Air Force at The Pentagon in Washington, D.C. Goodfellow was responsible for executing the Air Force Chief of Staff’s annual Title 10 Wargame. While serving in this capacity, Goodfellow was named the 2004 Deputy Chief of Staff, Air and Space Operations, Air Force Association Action Officer of the Year. Following his assignment with the Air Staff, Goodfellow next commanded Air Combat Command Training Support Squadron Detachment 1, the largest training support squadron in Air Combat Command.

Goodfellow was assigned to the U.S. Army War College from July 2007 to June 2010. Initially Goodfellow was a student working towards a Master of Strategic Studies. While a student he authored a research project entitled In-Lieu-Of Policy and Its Effects on the U.S. Air Force. In this project he explored the effects of the In-Lieu-Of Policy, a policy which tasked Air Force personnel to fill manning shortfalls in ground combat operations. He subsequently stayed on at the Army War College as a professor of strategy and director, joint doctrine.

In 2010, Goodfellow returned to Dyess Air Force Base, serving as commander of 7th Operations Group for one year and then serving as the vice commander of 7th Bomb Wing.

In June 2012, Goodfellow assumed command of the 12th Flying Training Wing at Joint Base San Antonio. The 12th Flying Training Wing has three flying groups and a maintenance group that spans across 1,600 miles. The wing manages the training pipelines for pilot instructor training, combat systems officer CSO) training, remotely piloted aircraft (RPA) pilot training, and basic sensor operator training. The wing also manages the airmanship programs of the U.S. Air Force Academy and is the single screening point for potential pilots, RPA pilots, and CSOs. While serving as the wing's commander, an Air Force investigation found that the wing's vice commander had engaged in an inappropriate relationship, and sent inappropriate emails to a subordinate's wife. The incident cast the vice commander, and his judgement, in a negative light. Goodfellow made the decision to relieve his vice commander due to a "loss of confidence in his ability to lead" the unit. Goodfellow relinquished command of the 12th Flying Training Wing to Colonel Matthew C. Isler on 25 June 2014.

In July 2014, Goodfellow became the commander of Squadron Officer College and commandant of Squadron Officer School at Maxwell Air Force Base. During his tenure as Commander and Commandant, the Squadron Officer School was shortened from eight weeks to five weeks. This allowed the school to ramp up from 3,600 to 4,700 students annually. This directive came from the chief of staff to allow more captains to attend Squadron Officer School in-residence to include all active duty captains.

In August 2016, Goodfellow became the director of Nuclear Enterprise Support Directorate (J10) at the Defense Threat Reduction Agency (DTRA) in Fort Belvoir, Virginia. J10 directly supports the Department of Defense and interagency nuclear enterprise stakeholders on safety, security, and effectiveness of the US nuclear deterrent force. J10 is also charged with warfighter support to the Joint Chiefs of Staff, Combatant Commanders, and the military services to counter current and potential threats posed to the US and allied forces by weapons of mass destruction.

In his final military assignment, Goodfellow was the director of strategic plans, programs and requirements for Air Force Global Strike Command at Barksdale Air Force Base. In this position Goodfellow was in charge of strategic planning to establish requirements and programming advocacy for the Minuteman III intercontinental ballistic missile force, B-1, B-2 and B-52 bombers, UH-1N helicopters, the E-4B National Airborne Operations Center Aircraft, as well as Nuclear Command, Control, and Communications systems.

== Awards and decorations ==
Goodfellow has been awarded the following awards and decorations:

- Distinguished Service Medal
- Defense Superior Service Medal
- Legion of Merit with two oak leaf clusters
- Distinguished Flying Cross with Valor device
- Defense Meritorious Service Medal
- Meritorious Service Medal with four oak leaf clusters
- Air Medal with four oak leaf clusters
- Air Force Commendation Medal with oak leaf cluster
- Air Force Achievement Medal with oak leaf cluster
- 1995 Mackay Trophy, U.S. Air Force's most meritorious flight of the year
- 1995 World Record Aviation, Nonstop Speed Around-the-World with refueling in flight
- 1995 Outstanding Graduate, B-1 Central Flight Instructor Course
- 1996 Distinguished Graduate, B-1 Weapon System Officer Training
- 1999 General Ira C. Eaker Award, Outstanding Single Feat of Military Airmanship in 8th Air Force
- 2004 Deputy Chief of Staff, Air and Space Operations, Air Force Association Action Officer of the Year

== Education ==
As a student at the University of New Mexico, Goodfellow earned a Bachelor of Science in economics in 1989. In 1996, he earned a Master of Aerospace Management degree from Embry–Riddle Aeronautical University. In 2003, he completed a Master of Military Operational Art and Science from Air University. In 2008, Goodfellow completed a Master of Strategic Studies from the U.S. Army War College.

Military offices
| Preceded by Richard M. Murphy | Commander of the 12th Flying Training Wing; 2012–2014 | Succeeded by Matthew C. Isler |
| Preceded by Mark Czelusta | Commander, Squadron Officer College; 2014–2016 | Succeeded by Wayne W. Straw |
| Preceded by Gregory S. Otey | Director, Nuclear Enterprise Directorate, Defense Threat Reduction Agency; 2016–2018 | Succeeded by John D. Spencer |
| Preceded by John T. Wilcox | Director of Strategic Plans, Programs, and Requirements of the Air Force Global Strike Command; 2018–2019 | Succeeded by Andrew Gebara |
