= Westside T. Larson =

United States Army Air Forces general

Westside Torkel Larson
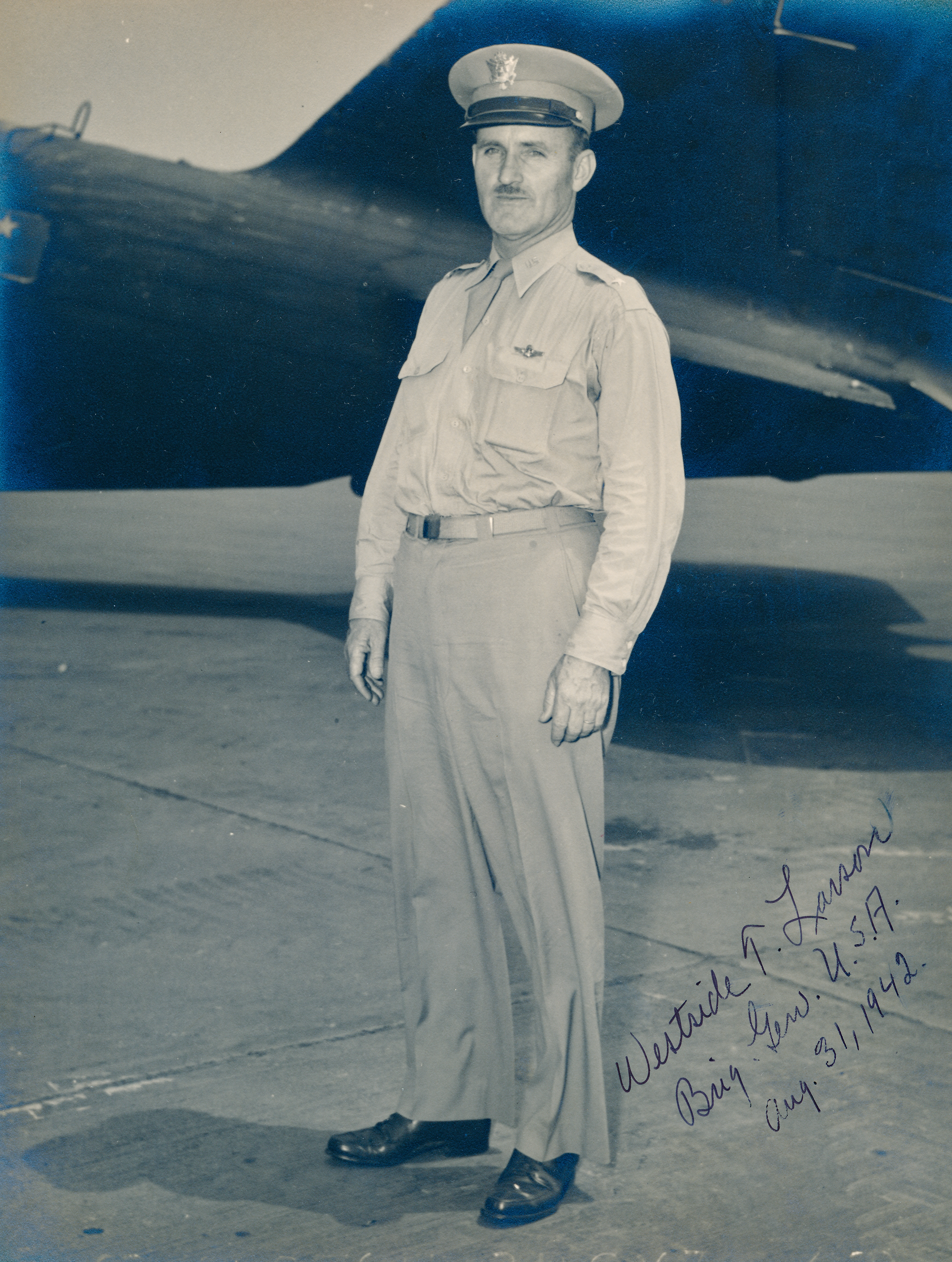
- General Westside T. Larson, US Army Air Corps, 1942
- Born: April 18, 1892; Vernalis, California
- Died: March 7, 1977 (aged 84); Los Angeles, California
- Military career
- Allegiance: United States of America
- Branch: United States Air Force
- Service years: 1917–1946
- Rank: Major general
- Nickname: Swede
- Commands: 13th Bombardment Group; Army Air Forces Antisubmarine Command; Third Air Force
- Conflicts: World War I World War II
- Awards: Army Distinguished Service Medal

Westside Torkel Larson (April 18, 1892 – March 7, 1977) was an American Air Force Major general, who was commandant of the Army Air Forces Antisubmarine Command during World War II. In 1933 he won the Mackay Trophy for his pioneering work with "blind flying" whereby pilots could take off and land an aircraft completely with instruments (without any visual cues outside the plane).

== Biography ==
He was born on April 18, 1892, in Vernalis, California. Larson enlisted in the Aviation Section of the Signal Corps Reserve on Oct. 19, 1917 and underwent his flying training at Park Field, Tennessee. He was commissioned a Second lieutenant on May 18, 1918, and subsequently transferred to the Ellington Field in Texas.

In November, 1921, Larson was transferred to 60th Service Squadron at Kelly Field.

He was a member of the Early Birds, a group of pioneering aviators, and an active member of the Sierra Club.

He died on March 7, 1977, at Hollywood Presbyterian Hospital in Los Angeles, California.
