= Fokker F.IV =

Airliner designed in the Netherlands

F.IV
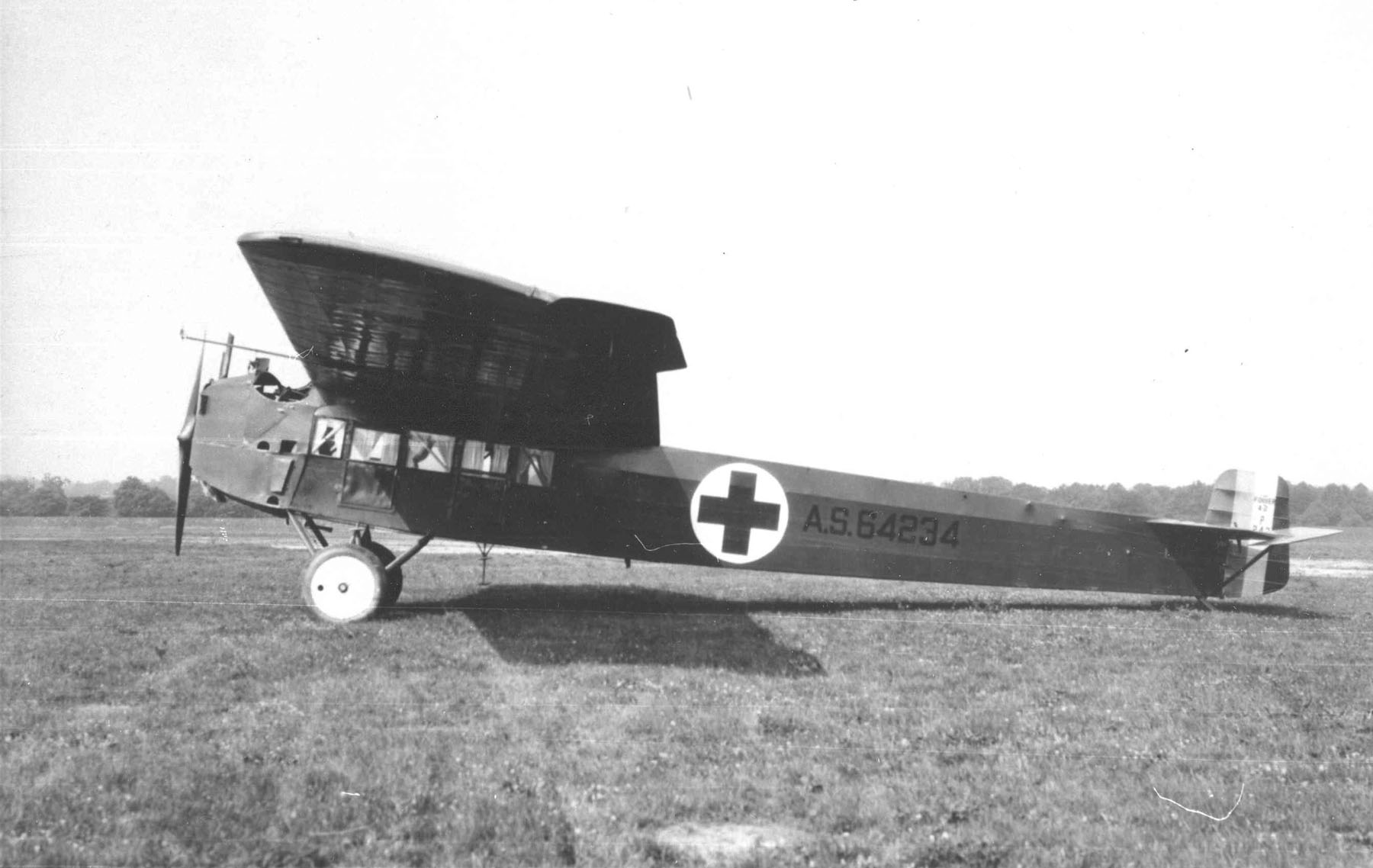
- Fokker A-2

General information
- Type: Airliner
- Manufacturer: Fokker
- Designer: Reinhold Platz
- Primary user: USAAS
- Number built: 2

History
- First flight: 1921

The Fokker F.IV is an airliner designed in the Netherlands in the early 1920s, with only two ever made, both for the United States Army Air Service (designated T-2). The aircraft made the first non-stop coast to coast flight of the continental United States in May 1923. The aircraft was powered by a twelve cylinder Liberty engine which was a popular engine for U.S. aircraft at this time.

One of the aircraft was preserved and is on display at the National Air and Space Museum (the Smithsonian) in Washington, DC. in the United States.

== Design and development ==
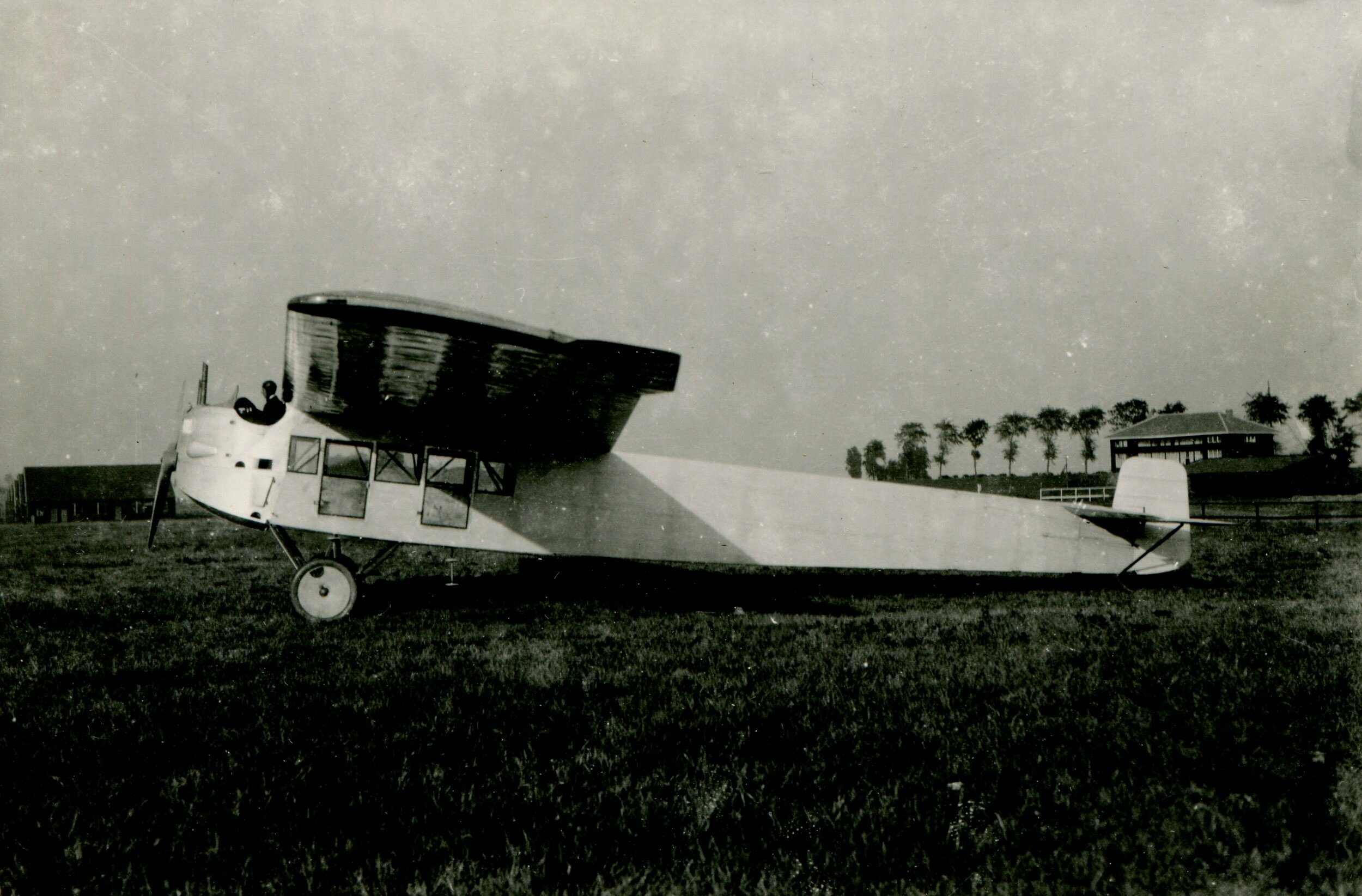
Fokker F.IV being test flown out of Schiphol airport in the Netherlands, before its delivery to the USA.

The Fokker F.IV was constructed in typical Fokker style (the largest design they had yet built), as a high-wing cantilever monoplane with fixed tailskid undercarriage. The pilot sat in an open cockpit alongside the engine in the manner of the Fokker F.III, while a cabin inside the fuselage could seat 12 passengers. Before the aircraft had even been built, the United States Army Air Service had bought two examples during a promotional visit to the country by Anthony Fokker. Built at Fokker's factory at Veere and flight-tested by Anthony Fokker himself, the two aircraft were crated and shipped to the United States where they were assembled at McCook Field and given the designation T-2. Despite Fokker's hopes that increasing airline passenger numbers would create interest in aircraft of larger seating capacity, the F.IV was too large for the needs of contemporary airlines, and no further aircraft were sold.

== Operational history ==
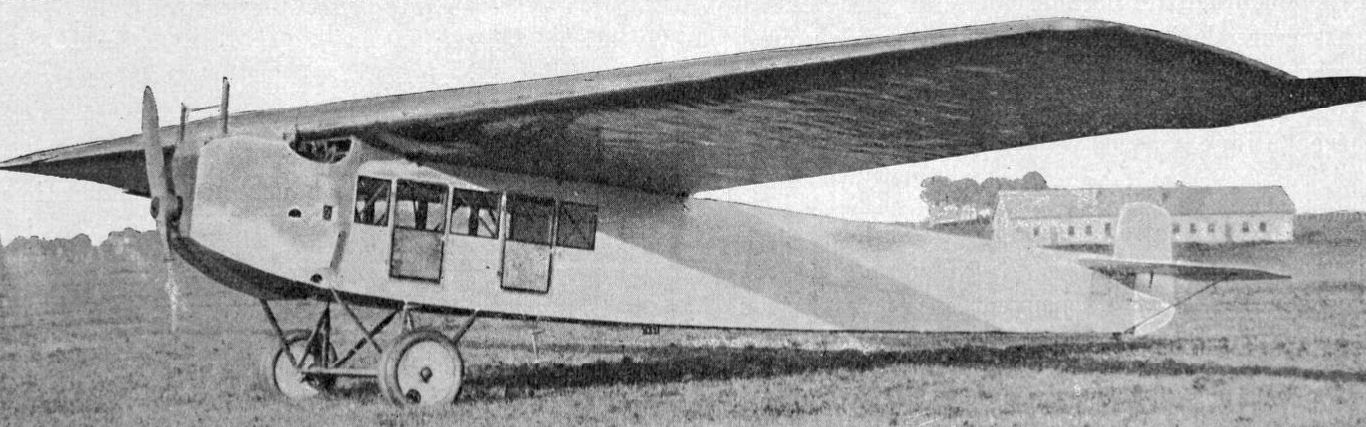
The Fokker F.IV

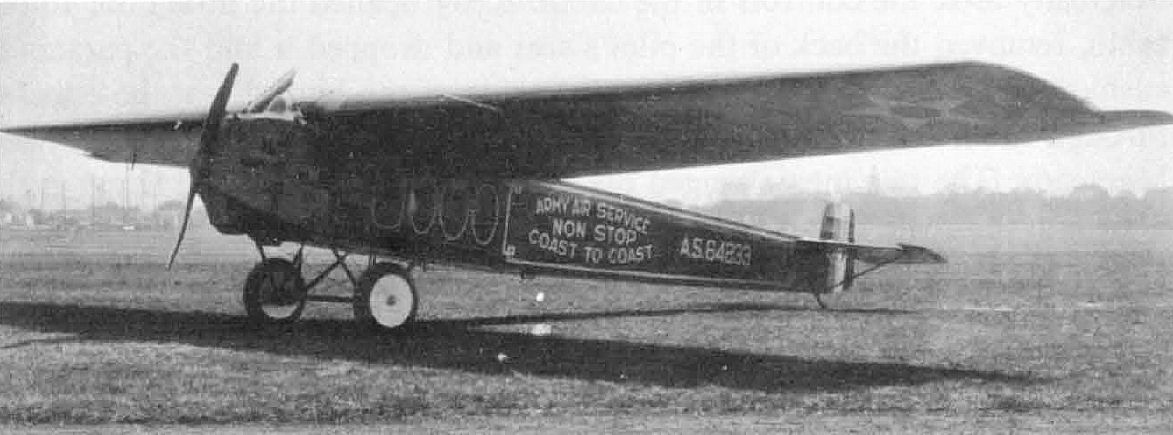
The T-2 for the record flight, on the side it reads "Army Air Service Non Stop Coast to Coast"

One of the T-2s was used for a number of long-distance flights over the next few years, culminating in the first nonstop transcontinental flight across the United States, an idea that originated with Lieutenant Oakley G. Kelly, one of the T-2's test pilots. The Army agreed to let Kelly have the aircraft specially modified to carry more fuel, and to install a connecting doorway between the cabin and cockpit so that he and fellow test-pilot Lieutenant John A. Macready could take turns flying and resting. An extra set of controls was also installed to facilitate the handover from one pilot to the other. As modified, the T-2 would take off with 2,350 L (620 US gal) of fuel on board, making it 1,110 kg (2,450 lb) over its prescribed maximum takeoff weight.

In late 1922, Kelly and Macready made two attempts at the transcontinental flight. The first was made on 5 October 1922, departing San Diego, California for New York City. After 35 hours 18 minutes in the air, they were forced to abandon the attempt and land due to fog. This would have been a world duration record, but without a barograph on board, it could not be officially recognized by the FAI. Kelly and Macready tried again on 3 November, but this time engine trouble forced an emergency landing near Indianapolis after 25 hours 30 minutes.

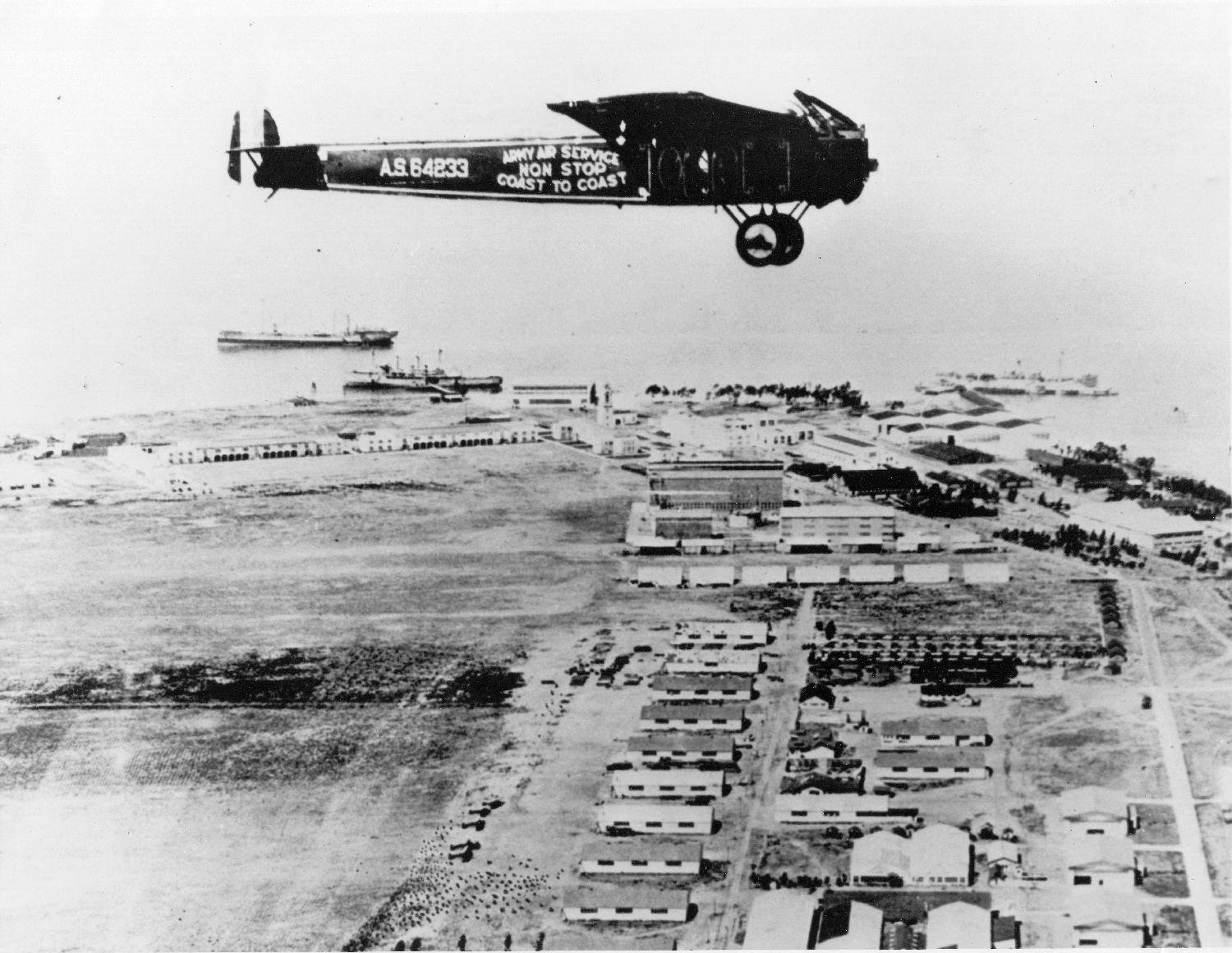
Fokker T-2 A.S. 64233 flying over Rockwell Field, San Diego, 1923.

The following year, they made a long-duration flight over a closed circuit over Dayton, Ohio, remaining aloft for 36 hours, 14 minutes 8 seconds between 16 and 17 April. This established a new world duration record, but also a new distance record, weight record, and eight various airspeed records. On 2 May 1923, they set out from New York to attempt the transcontinental flight again, this time traveling in the opposite direction. 26 hours 50 minutes later, they landed in San Diego, having covered 4,034 km (2,521 mi). Their aircraft is preserved in the National Air and Space Museum.

The other T-2 was converted into an air ambulance and given the designation A-2.

== Specifications ==
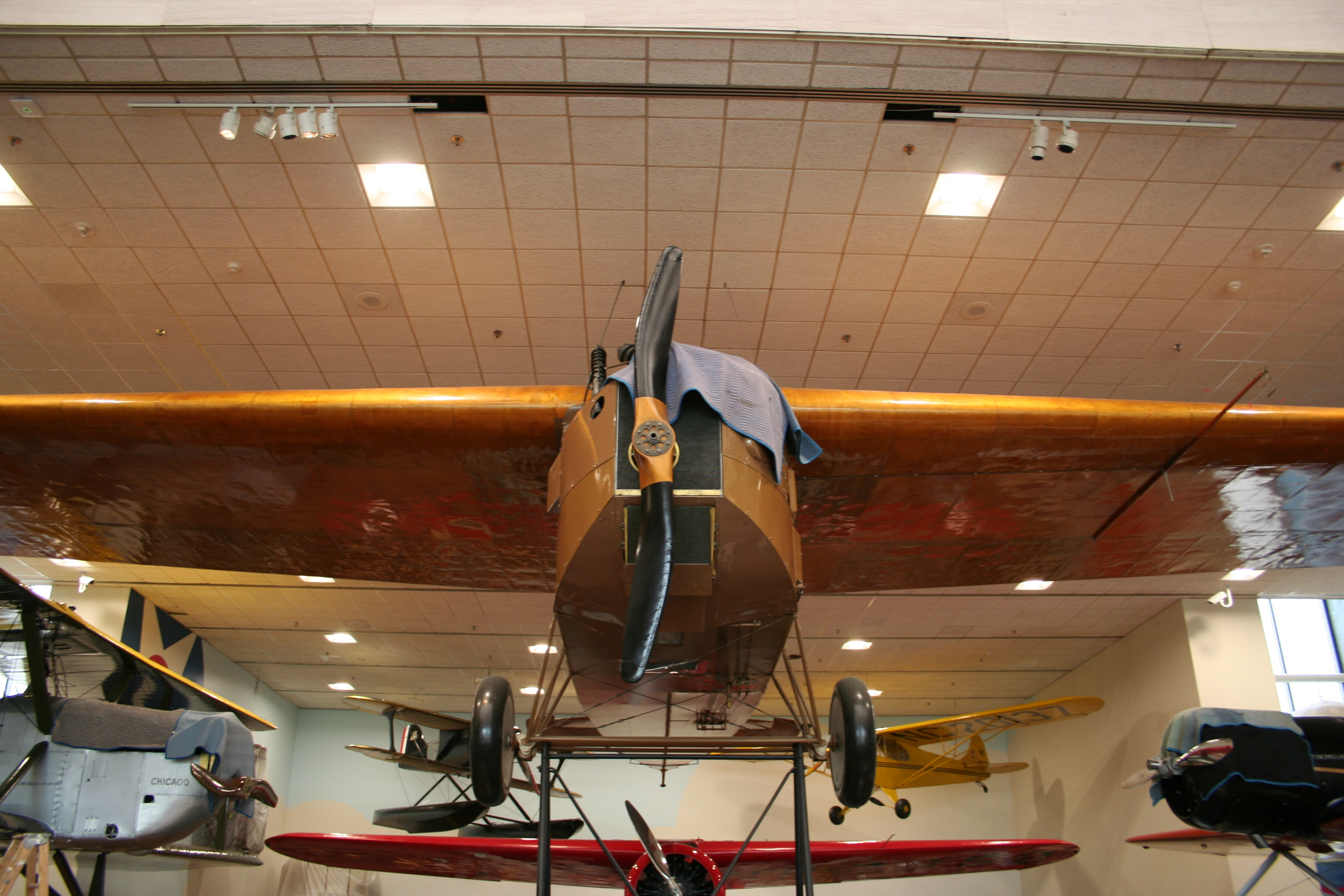
Transcontinental Fokker T-2 on display in Washington, D.C.

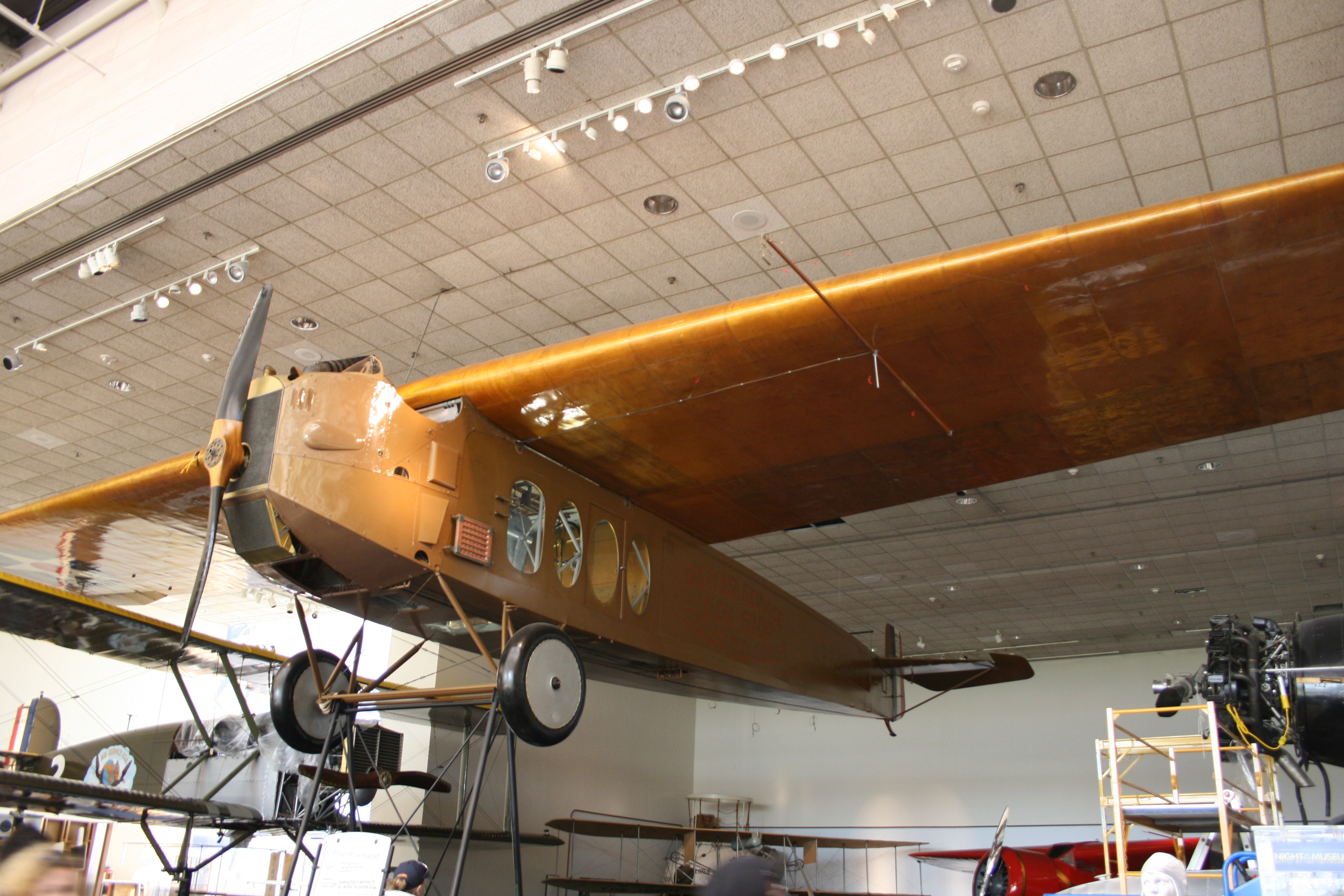
The record-setting Fokker T-2

General characteristics

- Crew: One pilot
- Capacity: 12 passengers
- Length: 15.00 m (49 ft 3 in)
- Wingspan: 24.80 m (81 ft 4 in)
- Height: 3.34 m (11 ft 0 in)
- Wing area: 34.6 m^{2} (372 sq ft)
- Empty weight: 2,250 kg (4,960 lb)
- Gross weight: 3,460 kg (7,630 lb)
- Powerplant: 1 × Packard-built Liberty L-12 piston engine , 298 kW (400 hp)

Performance

- Maximum speed: 150 km/h (93 mph, 81 kn)
- Range: 4,100 km (2,550 mi, 2,220 nmi)
- Service ceiling: 3,200 m (10,500 ft)
