= Mackay Trophy =

Annual US Air Force award

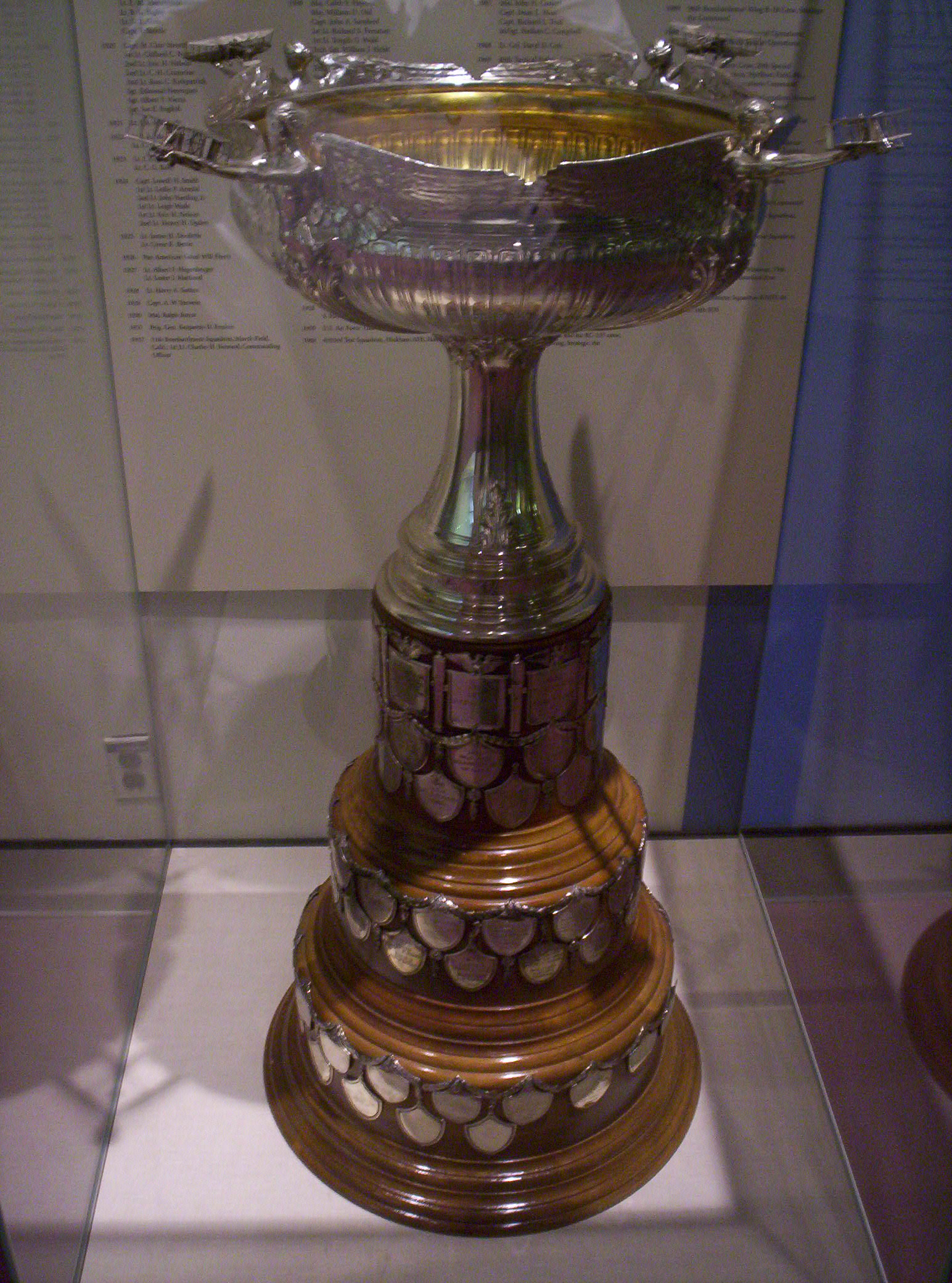
The Mackay Trophy on display at the National Air and Space Museum in Washington, D.C.

The Mackay Trophy is awarded yearly by the National Aeronautic Association (NAA) for the "most meritorious flight of the year" by an Air Force person, persons, or organization. The trophy is housed in the Smithsonian Institution's National Air and Space Museum. The award is administered by the NAA in cooperation with the U.S.A.F. .

The award was established on 27 January 1911 by Clarence Mackay, who was then head of the Postal Telegraph-Cable Company and the Commercial Cable Company. Before the establishment of the Air Force in the 1940s, aviators could compete for the trophy annually under rules made each year or the War Department could award the trophy for the most meritorious flight of the year.

The trophy was manufactured by Tiffany and Co. and consists of a gold-lined silver cup embellished with four Wright military flyers. The cup sits atop a tiered mahogany base with plaques for the awardees.

== Awardees ==
The following is a list of awardees:

=== 1910s ===
Year	Awardee	Action
1912	Lieutenant Henry Harley Arnold	"Most Meritorious Flight" during a reconnaissance competition flown over Virginia on 9 October 1912.
1913	Second Lieutenant Joseph Eugene Carberry; Second Lieutenant Fred Seydel	Reconnaissance
1914	Captain Townsend Foster Dodd; Lieutenant S. W. Fitzgerald	Reconnaissance
1915	Lieutenant Byron Q. Jones	Duration record of 8 hours 53 minutes.
1916		Not Awarded
1917		Not Awarded
1918	Captain Eddie Rickenbacker	Highest scoring American ace of World War I; 26 air-to-air victories.
1919	Lieutenant Colonel Harold Evans Hartney; Captain John Owen Donaldson; Captain Lowell Herbert Smith; Captain F. Steinle; Lieutenant Belvin N. Maynard; Lieutenant Alexander Pearson, Jr. Lieutenant R. S. Northington; Lieutenant E. M. Manzelman; Lieutenant B. G. Bagby; Lieutenant D. B. Gish	For flights between the Atlantic and Pacific Oceans.

=== 1920s ===
Year	Awardee	Action
1920	Captain St. Clair Streett; First Lieutenant Clifford C. Nutt; Second Lieutenant Erik H. Nelson; Second Lieutenant C. H. Crumrine; Second Lieutenant Ross C. Kirkpatrick; Sergeant Edmond Henriques; Sergeant Albert T. Vierra; Sergeant Joe E. English	For a flight from Mitchel Field, New York to Nome, Alaska and back.
1921	Lieutenant John Arthur Macready	World altitude record.
1922	Lieutenant John Arthur Macready; Lieutenant Oakley George Kelly	World duration record.
1923	Lieutenant John Arthur Macready; Lieutenant Oakley George Kelly	Non-stop transcontinental flight.
1924	Captain Lowell Herbert Smith; First Lieutenant Leslie P. Arnold; Second Lieutenant John Harding Jr. First Lieutenant Leigh Wade; First Lieutenant Erik H. Nelson; Second Lieutenant Henry H. Ogden	First round-the-world flight.
1925	Lieutenant James H. Doolittle; Lieutenant Cyrus K. Bettis	For winning the Schneider and Pulitzer Races.
1926	Major Herbert A. Dargue; Captain Ira Clarence Eaker; Captain Arthur B. McDaniel; Captain C. F. Woolsey; First Lieutenant J. W. Benton; First Lieutenant Charles McK Robinson; First Lieutenant Muir Stephen Fairchild; First Lieutenant Bernard S. Thompson; First Lieutenant Leonard D. Weddingon; First Lieutenant Ennis Whitehead	Pan-American Good Will Flyers.
1927	Lieutenant Albert Francis Hegenberger; Lieutenant Lester James Maitland	First transoceanic flight to Hawaii
1928	Lieutenant Harry A. Sutton	Performing spin testing of observation aircraft.
1929	Captain A. W. Steven	Long range aerial photography.

=== 1930s ===
Year	Awardee	Action
1930	Major Ralph Royce	For conducting an 'Arctic Patrol' round trip flight from Selfridge Field to Spokane, Washington, in January 1930. The flight provided valuable information about equipment and personnel operating in extreme cold weather.
1931	Brigadier General Benjamin Delahauf Foulois	Commanded the 1st Air Divisions (Provisional) through 40,000 flying hours with no loss of life or serious injury.
1932	11th Bombardment Squadron; First Lieutenant Charles H. Howard	Relief missions to snowbound Navajo and Hopi.
1933	Captain Westside T. Larson	For his pioneering flights in connection with the development of methods and procedure of Aerial Frontier Defense.
1934	Lieutenant Colonel Henry H. Arnold	Commanding officer of mass flight of 10 Martin B-10s from Bolling Field to Fairbanks, Alaska, and back.
1935	Captain Albert William Stevens; Captain Orvil Arson Anderson	Flew balloon to 72,395—a then-record.
1936	Captain Richard Emmel Nugent; First Lieutenant Joseph A. Miller; First Lieutenant Edwin G. Simenson; Second Lieutenant William P. Ragsdale, Jr. Second Lieutenant Burton W. Armstrong; Second Lieutenant Herbert Morgan, Jr. Tech Sergeant Gilbert W. Olson; Staff Sergeant Howard M. Miller; Corporal Air Mechanic 2/c Frank B. Connor	For demonstration of expert instrument flying and navigation, and the will to overcome obstacles to accomplish their mission under exceptionally adverse weather conditions during a flight of three B-10 s from Langley Field to Allegan, Michigan.
1937	Captain Carl J. Crane; Captain George Vernon Holloman	For successful development and demonstration of an automatic landing system.
1938	2d Bombardment Group; Lieutenant Colonel Robert Olds	For good will flight to Buenos Aires and return.
1939	Major Caleb Vance Haynes; Major William D. Old; Captain John Alexander Samford; First Lieutenant Richard S. Freeman; First Lieutenant Torgils G. Wold; Tech Sergeant William J. Heldt; Tech Sergeant Henry L. Hines; Tech Sergeant David L. Spicer; Staff Sergeant Russell E. Junior; Staff Sergeant James E. Sands; Master Sergeant Adolph Cattarius	For flight of Boeing XB-15 from Langley Field to Chile on relief mission after 1939 Chillán earthquake.

=== 1940s ===
Year	Awardee	Action
1940		Not Awarded
1941		Not Awarded
1942		Not Awarded
1943		Not Awarded
1944		Not Awarded
1945		Not Awarded
1946		Not Awarded
1947	Captain Chuck Yeager	First to break the sound barrier in the Bell X-1.
1948	Lieutenant Colonel Emil Beadury	For the rescue of twelve marooned airmen from the Greenland ice sheet
1949	Crew of Lucky Lady II; Captain James G. Gallagher	First non-stop aerial round-the-world flight.

=== 1950s ===
Year	Awardee	Action
1950	27th Fighter Wing	For moving 180 fighter jets across the Atlantic Ocean.
1951	Colonel Fred Ascani	For breaking the world speed record at 635.686 mph at the National Air Races.
1952	Major Louis H. Carrington, Jr. Major Frederick W. Shook; Captain Wallace D. Yancey	First non-stop flight across the Pacific Ocean in a multi-engine jet bomber; a B-45 Tornado.
1953	40th Air Division	For flying 25 F-84 Thunderjets non-stop from the United States to the United Kingdom and North Africa under adverse conditions.
1954	308th Bombardment Wing	For successfully completing a leap from intercontinental maneuver, a milestone in expanding and proving the combined operational capabilities of the B-47 Stratojet and in determining fatigue limits of combat crews.
1955	Colonel Horace A. Hanes	Breaking the flight airspeed record at 822.1 mph in an F-100 Super Sabre at the National Air Show.
1956	Captain Iven C. Kincheloe	Breaking the flight altitude record in a Bell X-2.
1957	93d Bombardment Wing	For non-stop circumnavigation of the globe by three B-52 Stratofortresses.
1958	Tactical Air Command's; Air Strike Force, X-Ray Tango	For its rapid and effective deployment to the troubled Far East during the fall of 1958.
1959	U.S. Air Force Thunderbirds	For goodwill tour of the Far East.

=== 1960s ===
Year	Awardee	Action
1960	6593d Test Squadron	For its first aerial recovery of an object from space orbit.
1961	Lieutenant Colonel William R. Payne; Major William L. Polthemus; Major Raymond R. Wagener	For their nonstop flight from Carswell Air Force Base to Paris, which culminated in the establishment of two international speed records.
1962	Major Robert G. Sowers; Captain Robert MacDonald; Captain John T. Walton	For flight as members of a B-58 Hustler crew which established three transcontinental speed records.
1963	Crew of C-47 "Extol Pink"; Captain Warren P. Tomsett; Captain John R. Ordemann; Captain Donald R. Mack; Tech Sergeant Edson P. Inlow; Staff Sergeant Jack E. Morgan; Staff Sergeant Frank C. Barrett	For the evacuation of wounded troops in Vietnam at night under enemy fire with a C-47 Skytrain.
1964	464th Troop Carrier Wing	For its participation in the humanitarian airlift of some 1,500 hostages and refugees from rebel held territory in the Republic of the Congo during November 1964.
1965	Colonel Robert L. Stephens; Lieutnenat Colonel Daniel Andre; Lieutenant Colonel Walter F. Daniel; Major Noel T. Warner; Major James P. Cooney	For flight in the Lockheed YF-12, which culminated in the establishment of nine new world speed and altitude records.
1966	Lieutenant Colonel Albert R. Howarth	For his exemplary courage and airmanship as a pilot in a combat strike mission in Southeast Asia under hazardous conditions of darkness and intense enemy fire.
1967	Major John H. Casteel; Captain Dean L. Hoar; Captain Richard L. Trail; Master Sergeant Nathan C. Campbell	For performing the first multiple aerial refueling between a KC-135 Stratotanker and an A-3 Skywarrior which simultaneously refueled an F-8 Crusader under emergency fuel shortages and combat condition.
1968	Lieutenant Colonel Daryl D. Cole	For gallantry as a C-130 Hercules pilot in the emergency evacuation of personnel in Vietnam.
1969	49th Fighter Wing	For a flawless deployment of 72 F-4 Phantom IIs from Spangdahlem Air Base to Holloman Air Force Base without a single abort, completing 504 successful air-to-air refuelings on the 5,000 mile trip.

=== 1970s ===
Year	Awardee	Action
1970	Captain Alan D. Milacek; Captain James A. Russell; Captain Roger E. Clancy; Captain Ronald C. Jones; Captain Brent C. O'Brien; Tech Sergeant Albert A. Nash; Staff Sergeant Adolfo Lopez, Jr. Staff Sergeant Ronald R. Wilson; Sergeant Kenneth E. Firestone; Airman First Class Donnell H. Cofer	Displaying great courage in returning their heavily damaged aircraft to their air base.
1971	Lieutenant Colonel Thomas B. Estes; Major Dewain C. Vick	For their operation of an SR-71 Blackbird aircraft establishing new world records for duration and distance covered.
1972	Captain Charles B. DeBellevue; Captain Jeffrey S. Feinstein; Captain R. Stephen Ritchie	For their extraordinary gallantry, superb airmanship, and intrepidity in the face of the enemy. (They were the three US Air Force "Aces" from the Vietnam War.)
1973	Operation Homecoming; Military Airlift Command Aircrews	For their efforts to repatriate U.S. prisoners of war from Vietnam.
1974	Major Roger J. Smith; Major David W. Peterson; Major Willard R. MacFarlane	For participating in F-15 advanced fight test during which time eight world class time-to-climb records were established.
1976	Captain James A. Yule	For gallantry and unusual presence of mind while participating in a flight as an instructor pilot of a B-52D Stratofortress. Captain James A Yule, distinguished himself by gallantry and unusual presence of mind while participating in an aerial flight as an instructor pilot of a B-52D aircraft on 19 May 1976. Captain Yule's flight developed a unique multiple emergency and he assumed command of the aircraft, and at great personal risk, checked out the hydraulic open wheel well area to detect the problem. Using initiative, he coordinated with ground agencies and crew members and determined that a safe landing could be made after loss of braking and complete failure of steering. Captain Yule's professional competence and outstanding airmanship under extreme stress resulted in successful recovery of the crew and a valuable aircraft. His courageous acts in landing a malfunctioning aircraft reflect great credit upon himself and the United States Air Force.
1977	Captain David M. Sprinkel; Crew of C-5 Mission AAM 1962-01; Airman First Class John M. Thompson	The aircrew, composed of members from the 436th Military Airlift Wing and the 512th Military Airlift Wing, airlifted a large superconducting electromagnet, support equipment, and personnel in support of joint U.S.-U.S.S.R. energy research program.
1978	3d Military Airlift Squadron Crew; Lieutenant Colonel Robert F. Schultz; Lieutenant Colonel Daniel W. Pruitt; Major John K. Roberts; Captain Herbert H. Schaunaman, Jr. Captain John A. Messerly; Tech Sergeant Owen L. Conlin; Tech Sergeant Joe L. Dickey; Staff Sergeant Raymond D. Stebleton; Sergeant John E. Legere; Sergeant David A. Kreyssig; Senior Airman William W. Tepper; Senior Airman Christopher A. Heitkamp; Airman First Class Danny F. Jennings 9th Military Airlift Squadron Crew; Major Jon S. Hillhouse; Captain Todd H. Hohberger; Captain Michael R. Smith; Captain John P. Foley, Jr. Captain Douglas K. Kronemeyer; Captain Michael A. Wright; Master Sergeant Charles E. Harper; Tech Sergeant Fred A. Booth, Jr. Tech Sergeant Joseph J. Clay; Staff Sergeant David B. Pierson; Airman First Class Thomas F. O’Brien; Airman First Class Mark S. Homan	Two C-5 Galaxy aircrews from the 436th Military Airlift Wing conducted the first C-5 airlift mission in support of the free world effort against rebel forces in Zaire.
1979	Major James E. McArdle, Jr.	For exceptional aerial skill in rescuing 28 Taiwanese seamen from a sinking cargo ship.

=== 1980s ===
Year	Awardee	Action
1980	Crews S-21 and S-31; 644th Bombardment Squadron; Maj William Thurston III; Maj John Durham; Maj William Manley; Capt Wayne Hesser; Capt Corrie Kundert; Capt Steven Nunn; Capt Charles Schencke; Capt Richard Zimmerman; Capt Brent Bunch; Capt Thomas Clark; Capt Michael McConnell; Capt James McLauchlin; TSgt Samuel Carmona; Sra Stephen McGinness	For executing a 43-hour non-stop, around-the world mission with the immediate objective of locating and photographing elements of the Soviet Navy operating in the Persian Gulf. Objectives for this flight were to prove to the Soviet Union that the aging B-52 could still perform its global mission as part of the US nuclear Single Integrated Operational Plan (SIOP). Another objective was to apply pressure to the Iranian government. The year before Iranian revolutionaries stormed the US Embassy taking 52 US diplomats and citizens hostage. The Iranian hostage crisis ultimately lasted for 444 days. As mentioned, a third objective was to use the long endurance flight capabilities of the B-52 to perform sea surveillance of foreign military forces.
1981	Captain John J. Walters	For participating in aerial flight as HH-3 Jolly Green Giant Commander in the rescue of 61 individuals, despite adverse conditions, from the burning cruise ship MS Prinsendam.
1982	Crew E-21; Captain Ronald L. Cavendish; Captain Ronald D. Nass; First Lieutenant James D. Gray; First Lieutenant Michael J. Connor; First Lieutenant Gerald E. Valentini; Second Lieutenant Frank A. Boyle; Tech Sergeant Ronald B. Wright	For successfully landing their crippled B-52 Stratofortress, under almost impossible conditions, thereby saving their lives and the aircraft.
1983	Crew E-113; Captain Robert J. Goodman; Captain Michael F. Clover; Captain Karol F. Wojcikowski; Staff Sergeant Douglas D. Simmons	On 5 September 1983, the KC-135 Stratotanker crew saved an F-4 Phantom and its crew over the Atlantic. The KC-135 refueled the F-4 four times and towed it with the refueling boom.
1984	Lieutenant Colonel James L. Hobson, Jr.	For actions as aircraft commander of the lead MC-130E Combat Talon I during the Grenada rescue mission.
1985	Lieutenant Colonel David E. Faught	For heroism and outstanding airmanship in saving the lives of eight crewmembers and preventing the loss of an irreplaceable aircraft.
1986	Captain Marc D. Felman; Captain Thomas M. Ferguson; Master Sergeant Clarence Bridges, Jr. Master Sergeant Patrick S. Kennedy; Master Sergeant Gerald G. Treadwell; Tech Sergeant Lester G. Bouler; Tech Sergeant Gerald M. Lewis; Staff Sergeant Samuel S. Flores; Staff Sergeant Scott A. Helms; Staff Sergeant Gary L. Smith	Following a precipitous and hazardous launch in near zero-visibility weather conditions, the crew of a KC-10 Extender from the 68th Air Refueling Wing provided emergency refueling to a KC-10 and three A-4 Skyhawk over the Atlantic Ocean on 5 March 1986.
1987	Detachment 15, Air Force Plant Representative Office and B-1B System Program Office	
1988	Captain Michael Eastman; Captain James Runk; Captain Kelly Scott; Senior Master Sergeant Arthur Vogt; Master Sergeant Robert Downs; Master Sergeant Charles Finnegan; Master Sergeant William Tobler; Master Sergeant James Maurer; Technical Sergeant William Nunn Jr. Sergeant Andrew Benucci, Jr. Staff Sergeant Timothy Hahn; Senior Airman Thomas Siler	For commanding C-5 Galaxy crew assigned to the 436th Military Airlift Wing. The aircraft and crew flew the first of the missions carrying equipment used to monitor nuclear testing to the Soviet Republic of Kazakhstan for joint verification experiments.
1989	Lieutenant Colonel Joseph G. Day; Captain Jeffrey K. Beene; Captain Vernon B. Benton; Captain Robert H. Hendricks	For successfully conducting the first-ever gear-up emergency landing of a B-1 Lancer aircraft.

=== 1990s ===
Year	Awardee	Action
1990	Crew of AC-130H Spectre; Mission #1J1600GA354; 16th Special Operations Squadron	For airmanship and outstanding professionalism of the crew during aerial flight over Panama during Operation Just Cause.
1991	Crew of Moccasin-05; Captain Tom Trask; Major Mike Homan; Master Sergeant Timothy Hadrych; Tech Sergeant Gregory Vanhyning; Tech Sergeant James A. Peterson, Jr. Staff Sergeant Craig Dock; Sergeant Thomas Bedard	For extraordinary heroism and self-sacrifice of the crew during the rescue of the pilot of Slate 46, a downed U.S. Navy F-14 Tomcat in Iraq during Operation Desert Storm.
1992	310th Airlift Squadron crew Major Christopher J. Duncan; Captain Peter B. Eunice; Captain Daniel G. Sobel; Captain Robert K. Stich; Master Sergeant Joseph C. Beard, Jr. Master Sergeant Carl V. Wilson; Tech Sergeant John H. Armintrout; Tech Sergeant Charles G. Bolden; Tech Sergeant Rory E. Calhoun; Tech Sergeant Ray A. Fisher; Tech Sergeant Peter J. Paquette; Tech Sergeant Andrew W. Toth; Tech Sergeant Darren R. Tresler; Staff Sergeant Ronald P. Hetzel	For extraordinary resourcefulness and unusual presence of mind during an unprovoked attack in international airspace.
1993	Crew E-21; Major Peter B. Mapes; Captain Jeffrey R. Swegel; Captain Joseph D. Rosmarin; Captain Charles W. Patnaude; Lieutenant Glen J. Caneel	For quick thinking, immediate reaction, and astute situational awareness enabling them to return a crippled B-52 Stratofortress to stable flight and safe landing.
1994	Crew of Air Force Rescue 206; Captain John W. Blumentritt; Captain Gary W. Henderson; Staff Sergeant Matthew A. Wells; Senior Airman Jeffrey M. Frembling; Senior Airman Jesse W. Goerz Crew of Air Force Rescue 208; Lieutenant Colonel James A. Sills; Lieutenant Colonel Gary L. Copsey; Lieutenant Richard E. Assaf; Tech Sergeant Gregory M. Reed; Senior Airman William R. Payne	For extraordinary heroism and self-sacrifice during the rescue of six Icelanders sailors who were stranded when their ship foundered in heavy seas and strong winds.
1995	Crew of BAT-01; Lieutenant Colonel Doug Raaberg; Captain Gerald Goodfellow; Captain Kevin Clotfelter; Captain Rick Carver; Captain Chris Stewart; Captain Steve Adams; Captain Kevin Houdek; Captain Steve Reeves	For the aerial achievement demonstrating the B-1 Lancer capability with live bombing activity over three bombing ranges on three continents in two hemispheres.
1996	Duke 01 Flight Crew; Lt Col Floyd Carpenter; Captain John Miller; Captain Charles Simpson; Captain Grey Morgan; Lieutenant David Mack; Captain Alan Ringle; Captain Gary Brooks; Captain Parker Northrup; Captain Tim Hines; Captain Jerry Hounchell; Captain Kelly Lawson; Captain Glen Caneel; Captain James Melvin; Captain Brett Lawless	For performing the first combat employment of the B-52H Stratofortress in history.
1997	Crew of Whiskey-05; MC-130H Combat Talon II; Lieutenant Colonel Frank J. Kisner; Major (Dr.) Robert S. Michaelson; Captain John C. Baker; Captain Reed Foster; Captain Mark J. Ramsey; Captain Robert P. Toth; Master Sergeant Gordon H. Scott; Tech Sergeant Tom L. Baker; Staff Sergeant John D. Hensdill; Staff Sergeant Jeffrey A. Hoyt	For overcoming hostile gunfire, three heavyweight air refuelings, and over 13 hours flying 3,179 nautical miles (5,888 km) to their objective to insert a European survey and assessment team and extract 56 people from the escalating Republic of the Congo Civil War, achieving this goal while on the ground for less than 23 minutes.
1998	Crew of Air Force Rescue 470	For making a mountaintop rescue of six survivors trapped inside an airplane which had crashed on a glacier during a near-zero visibility approach in winds gusting to 45 knots.
1999	Captain Jeffrey G. J. Hwang	In recognition of an exceptionally meritorious F-15C Eagle flight during combat operations in support of Operation Allied Force when he simultaneously destroyed two enemy aircraft during a single intercept.

=== 2000s ===
Year	Awardee	Action
2000	E10E1 Mission; Lieutenant Colonel Marlon Nailling; Major John Andrus; Major Kathryn Drake; Major David Sellars; Captain Richard Hunt; Captain Kevin Keith; Captain Karey Dufour; Captain Karin Petersen; Captain Donna Fournier; First Lieutenant Lucas Jobe; Staff Sergeant Edward Franceschina; Staff Sergeant Heather Robertson; Staff Sergeant Bradley Atherton; Staff Sergeant Ryan Reller; Staff Sergeant Brian Hoffmeyer; Senior Airman Chad Schusko E10E2 Mission; Colonel Byron Hepburn; Lieutenant Colonel Linda Torrens; Major Jonas Allman; Major Thomas Jenkins; Major Lola Casby; Major Jeffrey Davis; Captain Raymond Chehy; Captain Natalie Sykes; Captain Michael Smith; Captain Tim Carter; First Lieutenant Jennifer Bagozzi; Staff Sergeant Alan Wooldridge; Staff Sergeant Kelly Pollard; Staff Sergeant Trent Arnold; Staff Sergeant Juan Garza; Senior Airman Anna Duffner Critical Care Air Transport Team; Colonel David Welling; Major Stephan A. Alkins; Captain Raymond M. Nudo; Captain Andrew J. Reynolds; Captain Bernd T. Wegner; Staff Sergeant Chyrise M. Jenkins; Staff Sergeant Christopher E. Whited	For performing heroic rescue efforts in record time for victims of the USS Cole attack during the 6,000 mile round-trip journey between Aden, Yemen, Djibouti, and Ramstein Air Base, Germany. Aircrew members launched two rescue C-9 Nightingale crews within one hour of alert.
2001	KNIFE 04; 20th Special Operations Squadron; First Lieutenant Mike Holder; Capt Jay Humphrey; Staff Sergeant Vince DePersio; Staff Sergeant Chad Ackman; Staff Sergeant Mark Wolcott; Staff Sergeant Al Aguinaldo; Staff Sergeant Paul Orse; Staff Sergeant Bill Adams; Senior Airman Jason Andrews	The crew of Knife 04, an MH-53M Pave Low helicopter, distinguished themselves by extraordinary acts of valor and heroism during the rescue of their sister ship's crew on 02 Nov 01. On that date Knife 04 was chalk two on a short notice tasking for an urgent personnel recovery mission behind enemy lines. Due to severe weather along the route and a radar malfunction in the lead aircraft, Knife 04 assumed lead in an attempt to get the formation clear of the weather. While flying through the blinding weather, the two aircraft lost sight of one another. As Knife 04 tried to relocate their wingman, they lost radio contact. Contacting airborne command and control assets, Knife 04 confirmed that the other aircraft was on the ground. Several attempts to reach the downed crewmembers that had sustained injuries and were now exposed to subzero temperatures and enemy ground forces were unsuccessful. Knife 04 began coordinating the first of four aerial refuelings and initiated on scene command responsibilities while evading bad weather and taking enemy ground fire. As the weather cleared, Knife 04 located the crash site and began an approach to the rugged area. The extremely slim power margin forced them to dump all but the very minimum fuel required for the approach. After a perilous landing, the downed aircrew were brought aboard. The takeoff in blinding snow with rotor speed decreasing to dangerous levels was accomplished through superior effort and ability from the crew. During the egress from hostile territory, Knife 04 was forced to air refuel several times as the minimum power margin prohibited their loading all of the required fuel in one engagement.
2002	GRIM 31; 16th Special Operations Squadron	For rescuing 82 U.S. Army soldiers, including 28 wounded, trapped in a rugged valley in Afghanistan by Taliban and Al-Qaeda forces. The 14-man crew of an Air Force AC-130H Spectre gunship engaged the enemy from overhead during a two-hour, night-time operation that permitted two UH-60 Black Hawk helicopters to land and pick up the battered troops.
2003	Crew of Vijay 10; Lieutenant Colonel Shane Hershman; Major Bob Colvin; First Lieutenant Matt Clausen; Master Sergeant Shawn Brumfield; Master Sergeant Chris Dockery	Vijay 10 was the lead C-17 Globemaster III in a formation of C-17s from the 62d and 446th Airlift Wings, McChord Air Force Base, Washington. Vijay 10's crew led the largest combat airdrop since World War II. On 26 March 2003, Vijay 10 led Operation Northern Delay with an airdrop of 1,000 members of the US Army 173rd Airborne Brigade soldiers over Bashur, Iraq which opened the northern front to combat operations. After the initial insertion, Vijay 10 crewmembers, along with active and reserve crews from Charleston and McChord Air Force Bases flew four more night missions.
2004	Crew of Jolly 11; First Lieutenant Bryan Creel; Captain Joseph Galletti; Staff Sergeant Vincent J. Eckert; Staff Sergeant John Griffin; Staff Sergeant Patrick Ledbetter; Sergeant Thomas Ringheimer Crew of Jolly 12; Captain Rob Wrinkle; First Lieutenant Gregory Rockwood; Tech Sergeant Michael Preston; Tech Sergeant Paul Silver; Staff Sergeant Matthew Leigh; Staff Sergeant Michael Rubio; Senior Airman Edward Ha	Jolly 11 and Jolly 12 crewmembers distinguished themselves by gallantry in connection with rescue operations near Kharbut, Iraq, on 16 April 2004. While supporting of Operation Iraqi Freedom, Jolly 11 Flight launched to rescue a five-person crew of a U.S. Army CH-47 Chinook that crashed in a sandstorm with near zero-visibility. En route to the crash scene, crews realized their forward looking infra-red and night vision goggles were ineffective. Despite this handicap the crew of Jolly 11 was able to locate the survivors. Both aircraft then made near zero-visibility approaches relying nearly exclusively on the flight engineers and aerial gunners inputs for precision navigation. Following the successful survivor contacts and recovery by the Flight's Pararescuemen, Jolly 11 and Jolly 12 were individually engaged by separate multiple surface-to-air missiles attacks. Using evasive maneuvers Jolly 11 evaded two missiles. Both Jolly 11 and Jolly 12 continued to provide support with defensive fire until the formation was clear of the threat area saving the lives of five U.S. Army personnel.
2005	Crew of Train 60; Major Michael S. Frame; Major Brian Lewis; Master Sergeant Tommy Lee; Master Sergeant John Spillane; Tech Sergeant Corey Turner	Train 60 crewmembers were C-130 Hercules instructors for the newly formed Iraqi Air Force. The crew's unprecedented mission was to act as the inaugural Iraqi "Air Force One" and take the Iraq Prime Minister from Baghdad to Al Sulaymania to meet with Kurdish leaders. During the mission, Train 60 crewmembers instructed Iraqi aircrew members on flight procedures in a combat environment, quickly improvised a low-level route through mountains to avoid low ceilings and landed on a taxi way at an uncontrolled and uncompleted Iraqi airfield that did not have an American security presence. Their efforts ensured the safety of the all Iraqi crew and the Iraqi head of state during this landmark airlift event.
2006	Captain Scott Markle	A-10 pilot Captain Markle was diverted to support special forces troops along the Afghanistan-Pakistan border in contact with Taliban forces. He arrived just before dawn and heavy gunfire and tracers and poor visibility made it difficult to find the team's location. Captain Markle, unable to employ weapons due to the enemy's close proximity to the team, flew a dangerously low pass over the area while releasing self-protection flares. When flares momentarily halted enemy fire. The ground controller requested a few more close passes to the special forces team time to create more distance between themselves and the Taliban. The separation allowed Captain Markle to strafe the enemy area with more than 1,000 30 millimeter rounds on his final pass. The special forces team was able to disengage with no casualties. Captain Markle was credited with destroying three machine gun nests and killing 40 enemy combatants.
2007	Panther 11 Flight; Colonel Charles Moore; Lieutenant Colonel Stephen Williams; Captain Lawrence Sullivan; Captain Kristopher Struve	A 4-ship formation of F-16 Fighting Falcons based at Joint Base Balad, Iraq flew an 11-hour mission over 6 countries and requiring 13 air refuelings supported ground operations in the Tora Bora region of Afghanistan
2008	Crew of Bone 23; Major Norman Shelton; Captain Kaylene Giri; Captain Louis Heidema; Captain Boyd Smith	Confronting a two hundred-strong enemy force that was attempting to overrun their base, the Joint Terminal Attack Controller requested a two thousand pound guided weapon. When the crew of BONE 23 realized friendly forces were in Danger Close range, they suggested a five hundred pound guided weapon, instead. Faced with a critical fuel situation, the crew coordinated to move their tanker closer providing more time on station and, within thirty minutes, BONE 23 accomplished three bomb runs decisively slowing the enemy attack, allowing coalition forces to regroup.
2009	Crew of Pedro 16; Captain Robert Rosebrough; First Lieutenant Lucas Will; Master Sergeant Dustin Thomas; Staff Sergeant Tim Philpott	The crews of "Pedro 15" and "Pedro 16" operating HH-60G Pavehawks came under enemy fire 29 July 2009 during a medical evacuation mission as part of the 129th Expeditionary Rescue Squadron at Kandahar Air Base, Afghanistan. Three Soldiers had been wounded near Forward Operating Base Frontenac when their convoy was hit with an improvised explosive device and became engaged by enemy combatants. During the recovery operation "Pedro 15" was downed by enemy fire, injuring the crew. "Pedro 16", along with Army OH-58 Kiowas, suppressed enemy fire. Captain Rosebrough developed a plan to evacuate all the wounded personnel aboard "Pedro 16" and two Kiowa helicopters. Their efforts ensured the recovery of the six "Pedro 15" crew members and three wounded soldiers.

=== 2010s - present ===
Year	Awardee	Action
2010	Dude Flight; Lieutenant Colonel Donald D. Cornwell; Lieutenant Colonel Dylan T. Wells; Captain Leigh P. Larkin; First Lieutenant Nicholas R. Tsougas	While operating as a flight of two F-15E Strike Eagles - call signs Dude 01 and Dude 02 - they were tasked to support a Combined Joint Special Operations Task Force team surrounded by over 100 enemy fighters in the town of Bala Morgab, Afghanistan. With weather below rescue force launch minimums, Dude flight used terrain-following radar to execute five "Show of Force" passes in a valley surrounded by high terrain. When hostilities escalated, Dude Flight expertly employed six Joint Direct Attack Munitions, helping kill over 80 Taliban fighters who occupied reinforced positions within the town. Their efforts helped save the lives of approximately 30 coalition troops. There were no civilian casualties.
2011	Crews of Pedro 83 Flight; Crew Members of Pedro 83; Captain Joshua Hallada (Flight Lead); First Lieutenant Elliott Milliken (Co-Pilot); Senior Airman Michael Price (Flight Engineer); Senior Airman Justin Tite (Aerial Gunner); Crew Members of Pedro 84; Major Philip Bryant (Mission Pilot); Captain Louis Nolting; Technical Sergeant James Davis; Technical Sergeant Heath Culbertson; Technical Sergeant William Gonzalez; Crew Members of Guardian Angel Team; Major Jesse Peterson (Guardian Angel Team Commander); First Lieutenant Aaron Hunter (Combat Rescue Officer); Master Sergeant Matthew Schrader (Pararescueman); Technical Sergeant Joshua Vanderbrink; Technical Sergeant Christopher Uriarte; Technical Sergeant Shane Hargis; Staff Sergeant Jason Ruiz; Staff Sergeant Angel Santana; Staff Sergeant Nathan Greene; Staff Sergeant Zachary Kline (Pararescueman); Staff Sergeant William Cenna	The Crews of Pedro 83 Flight, who distinguished themselves in combat search and rescue operations on April 23, 2011 while assigned to the 83rd Expeditionary Rescue Squadron, Bagram Air Base, Afghanistan.
2012	HH-60 Crews of Pedro 83 and Pedro 84; Captain Vincent B. Powell; Captain Thomas R. Stengl; Captain Brion P. Stroud; First Lieutenant Paul A. Fry; Chief Master Sergeant Norman S. Callahan; Technical Sergeant John G. Ballard; Staff Sergeant Lucas G. Ferrari; Staff Sergeant Mahonri R. Gibson; Staff Sergeant Thomas A. Hervert; Technical Sergeant Cameron J. Hystad; Staff Sergeant William A. Mathis; Senior Airman Brian D. Ayers; Senior Airman Jordan J. Dehlbom	The members and crew of Pedro 83 Flight distinguished themselves an Air Force Combat search and rescue aircrew from November 1, 2011 to February 8, 2012. In January 2012, Pedro 83 Flight, launched in response to a MEDEVAC call near Mazar-e-Sharif, Afghanistan. The flight navigated through low visibility to reach the patient. Upon arrival, Pedro 84 executed a hoist over hostile terrain to infiltrate Pararescuemen and provide life-saving care to the wounded soldier. The actions of Pedro 83 Flight saved the patient's life while providing direct support to the ongoing assault operations.
2013	Crews of Rooster 73 Flight; Crew Members of Rooster 73; Major Ryan P. Mittelstet; Captain Brett J. Cassidy; Technical Sergeant David A. Shea; Staff Sergeant Christopher Nin; Crew Members of Rooster 74; Captain William J. Mendel; Captain Arjun U. Rau; Staff Sergeant James M. McKay; Staff Sergeant Kenneth E. Zupkow II; Crew Members of Rooster 75; Major B. Taylor Fingarson; Captain Daniel J. Denney; Master Sergeant Alberto L. Delgado; Master Sergeant Jeremy D. Hoye; Technical Sergeant Daniel Warren; Technical Sergeant Jason Broline; Senior Airman Lee Von Hackprestinary	The crews of Rooster 73 flight distinguished themselves as CV-22 Pilots and Flight Engineers with the 8th Expeditionary Special Operations Squadron, on December 21, 2013 while in support of Noncombatant Evacuation Operations in the vicinity of Bor, South Sudan. On approach to land, the flight took heavy surface-to-air fire, resulting in damage to multiple aircraft systems. The damage caused multiple fuel leaks requiring emergency airborne refueling to allow for the safe return of all three battle damaged aircraft, crew, and passengers. Damage to the aircraft required crew members to manually extend refueling probes and activate emergency aerial refueling valves to enable multiple refueling tracks to take on enough fuel to reach Entebbe. Time critical decision making, outstanding airmanship, and extraordinary crew resource management allowed the members of Rooster 73 Flight to save 34 aircrew and three $89 million aircraft.
2014	THE CREW OF IRONHAND 41 FLIGHT Captain Gregory R. Balzhiser; Captain David A. Kroontje	The aircrew of the Pacific Air Forces` Ironhand 41 flight, orchestrated four flawless attacks during an eight-hour night, flying F-16Cs over 500 miles in enemy-controlled terrain. Their attacks destroyed three Islamic State in Iraq and the Levant (ISIL) blockades, multiple armored vehicles, one observation post, and killed ISIL fighters who were firing upon 40,000 trapped Yazidi civilians who had fled to Mount Sinjar. Their outstanding battle management caused the cessation of ISIL indirect fires on civilians, ended ISIL freedom of movement around Mount Sinjar, facilitated the evacuation corridor by reducing pressure on Peshmerga ground forces, and ultimately saved the lives of 40,000 civilians including women, children, elderly, and the infirm.
2015	THE CREWS OF WEASEL 41 AND WEASEL 51 FLIGHT Lieutenant Colonel Jeffrey Cohen; Major Seth Taylor; Captain Danielle Kangas; Captain Mathew Park	On July 26, 2015, United States Air Force Lieutenant Colonel Jeffrey Cohen, Major Seth Taylor, Captain Danielle Kangas, and Captain Mathew Park, arrived on scene over Hassekah, a major city in northeast Syria, where friendly Syrian Kurdish ground units were battling the last significant holdout of a group of Islamic State enemy personnel. A firefight in the southeast portion of the city had erupted, pinning Kurdish ground units in a dense urban city block. Overcoming targeting complicated by weather and limited communications, Lieutenant Colonel Cohen and Major Taylor expertly coordinated and employed several successful munitions in support of Kurdish forces despite highly restrictive attack parameters. Captain Kangas and Captain Park tracked and executed an effective attack on fleeing enemy soldiers wearing blankets to reduce their infrared signature. In a four-hour period, the crews of WEASEL 41 and WEASEL 51 flight employed 15 precision guided munitions, destroying eight enemy fighting positions, with no friendly or civilian casualties. This marked the end of a three-month operation in Northern Syria that resulted in friendly Kurdish forces retaking over 17 thousand square kilometers of territory, securing the Syria/Turkey border between Iraq and the Euphrates River.
2016	THE CREW OF SPOOKY 43 FLIGHT Major Alexander Hill; Major Aaron Hall; Captain Garrett Robinson; 1st Lt. Zachary Hanley; 1st Lt. Marshall Shefler; Staff Sgt. William Cody; Staff Sgt. Freddie Coffee; Staff Sgt. Cody Flora; Staff Sgt. David Kerns Jr. Staff Sgt. Timothy Lewis; Staff Sgt. Alexander Skidgel; Senior Airman Kellen Lloyd; Senior Airman Jonathan Russell; Airman 1st Class Raymond Bourne	On November 2, 2016, the crew of SPOOKY 43 was tasked to provide close air support and armed reconnaissance for a 55-man combined American and Afghan special operations team conducting a raid to interdict insurgent command and control nodes, senior leadership, and their networks. After the crew of SPOOKY 43 arrived overhead, the combined American and Afghan special operations force (also referred to as “friendlies”) was caught in a deadly ambush by a large insurgent force. The friendlies were engaged by small arms, heavy machine gun, and grenade fire from multiple defensive fighting positions. The crew of SPOOKY 43 provided close air support to the friendly ground force with the 25, 40, and 105-millimeter guns, to allow them the freedom to maneuver and provide care for casualties. In order to protect the ground team from enemy personnel, the crew of SPOOKY 43 expertly employed the 105-millimeter gun at an unprecedented 12 meters from the friendly personnel. Due to the outstanding airmanship and bravery under extremely challenging circumstances, SPOOKY 43 destroyed 10 defensive fighting positions, 27 enemy insurgents, and three enemy technical vehicles, saving the lives of 50 combined American and Afghan special operations forces personnel who would have otherwise perished in the enemy ambush. The professional ability and outstanding aerial accomplishments of the crew of SPOOKY 43 reflect credit upon themselves and the United States Air Force.
2017	The Crew of Boar 51 Flight Major Schultz; Captain Harvey	On May 2, 2017, the crew of Boar 51 was re-tasked to support a troops-in-contact situation where 50 American and countless Syrian Democratic Forces were pinned down with heavy machine gun fire, mortars, and rocket-propelled grenades. Boar 51 flight expended 1,500 pounds of ordnance and 1,300, 30-millimeter rounds on 19 targets, often inside danger close criteria. For over five hours, Captain Harvey and Major Schultz overcame communications degradation, severe thunderstorms and near-zero visibility, ultimately saving the lives of friendly forces. The distinctive accomplishments of Captain Harvey and Major Schultz reflect great credit upon themselves and the United States Air Force.
2018	The Crew of DRACO 42 Flight Major Caitlin Reilly; Captain Samantha Lang; Captain Patrick Perez; Senior Airmen Kyle Hanson	The crew of Draco 42 distinguished themselves as a U-28A crew, 319th Special Operations Squadron, Combined Joint Special Operations Air Component-Afghanistan in support of Operation Freedom's Sentinel while serving as the Tactical Air Controller-Airborne for a joint, interagency, time-sensitive mission on August 14, 2018. Despite multiple rounds of indirect fire impacting near the aircraft at their forward refueling location, Draco 42 continued to coordinate rapidly evolving target and concept of operation changes with geographically separated air and ground assets. Once airborne, Draco 42 managed the highly complex operation of simultaneous helicopter infiltrations to time-sensitive targets in urban areas that yielded valuable intelligence on a top-level Al Qaeda leader and four enemy killed in action. The professional ability and outstanding aerial accomplishments of the crew of Draco 42 reflect great credit upon themselves and the United States Air Force.
2019	The Crew of HAWG 71 Flight Captain Alexander E. Boules; Major Charles C. Stretch	The crew of Hawg 71 were deployed from their home station of Davis-Monthan Air Force Base, Arizona, as a two-ship formation of A10Cs, flying out of the 354th Expeditionary Fighter Squadron, 451st Air Expeditionary Group, Kandahar Air Base, Afghanistan, in support of Operation Freedom’s Sentinel. On July 19, 2019, Captain Boules and Major Stretch were tasked to support a troops-in-contact situation in which countless Afghan Special Forces were being overrun, captured, and pinned down with heavy machine gun fire and rocket propelled grenades. Working together as Hawg 71 flight, Captain Boules and Major Stretch waged a diligent battle against the difficulties of night operations, terrain, dislocated controllers, and significant language barriers to enable coordinated strikes against enemy fighters, ultimately saving the lives of 12 Afghan Special Forces members. The professional ability and outstanding aerial accomplishments of the crew of Hawg 71 reflect great credit upon themselves and the United States Air Force.
2021	The Crews of Shadow 77 and Shadow 78 Crew of Shadow 77: Capt Lawrence S. Bria; Capt Sam B. Pearce; Capt Aaron M. Rigg; Maj Joshua T. Burris; Capt Michael G. Shelor; SSgt Daniel J. Mayle; SSgt Kevin P. Heimbach; SrA Denver M. Reinwald; SrA Timothy J. Cisar Crew of Shadow 78: Capt Culley R. Horne; 1Lt William A. Bachmann; Capt Ryan M. Elliott; Capt Benjamin A. Hoyt; SSgt Dylan T. Hansen; SSgt Andrew J. Malinowski; SSgt Tyler J. Blue; SSgt Gregory A. Page; SrA Miguelle B. Corpuz	As outlined in the United States Air Force nomination, the crews distinguished themselves in support of Operation Freedom’s Sentinel when in August 2021 they alert launched from Al Dhafra Air Force Base, United Arab Emirates, for a Close Air Support mission to protect the 2,000 Americans evacuating the embassy in Kabul, Afghanistan. The crews skillfully maintained visual custody of all American personnel enroute to Hamid Karzai International Airport and provided full-motion video in real-time to the Secretary of Defense and the Joint Chiefs of Staff as they watched the evacuation transpire. Overall, the crews of Shadow 77 and 78 flew the longest unaugmented AC-130J flight to date and their efforts to safeguard the embassy evacuation directly resulted in the successful rescue of 2,000 American diplomats with zero casualties.

== See also ==
- List of aviation awards
