= Coronet Bat =

US Air Force circumnavigation and training exercise

Coronet Bat was a 1995 U.S. Air Force exercise in which two B-1B Lancers flew around the world non-stop, dropping practice bombs on ranges in Europe, Asia, and North America.

A group of four B-1Bs was assembled for the exercise: the lead primary aircraft, nicknamed "Hellion" (tail number 85-0057); the second primary aircraft, "Global Power" (tail number 85-0082); and two "airborne spares": "Bad to the B-one" and "Black Widow". The group was commanded by Lt. Col. Doug Raaberg, pilot of "Hellion". The rest of the aircrews included Capt. Gerald Goodfellow, Capt. Kevin Clotfelter, Capt. Rick Carver, Capt. Chris Stewart, Capt. Steve Adams, Capt. Kevin Houdek and Capt. Steve Reeves. The aircraft were loaded with BDU-50 munitions: inert, concrete-filled 500-pound practice versions of the Mark 82 bomb.

Around 3 a.m. on June 2, 1995, the four B-1Bs launched from Dyess Air Force Base, Texas, and headed east. One of the spare aircraft landed at Langley Air Force Base, Virginia; the other at Lajes Field in the Azores. The two primary aircraft continued on through the Strait of Gibraltar, across the Mediterranean Sea, over the Indian Ocean, north over the Pacific Ocean to the Aleutian Islands, then southeast to the west coast of the United States, and thence to a landing at Dyess. En route, the aircraft dropped practice bombs on Italy's Pachino Range, the Torishima Range near Japan's Kadena Air Base, and the Utah Test and Training Range. The flight took 36 hours and 13 minutes, including six air refuelings, making for an average speed of 631.16 mph (1,015.75 km/h).

All eight crew members who completed the around-the-world flight were awarded the Mackay Trophy.

== See also ==
- Lucky Lady II – the first non-stop around-the-world flight, 1949
- Operation Power Flite – B-52 around-the-world simulated bombing mission, 1957
