= Lucky Lady II =

US Boeing B-50 bomber aircraft

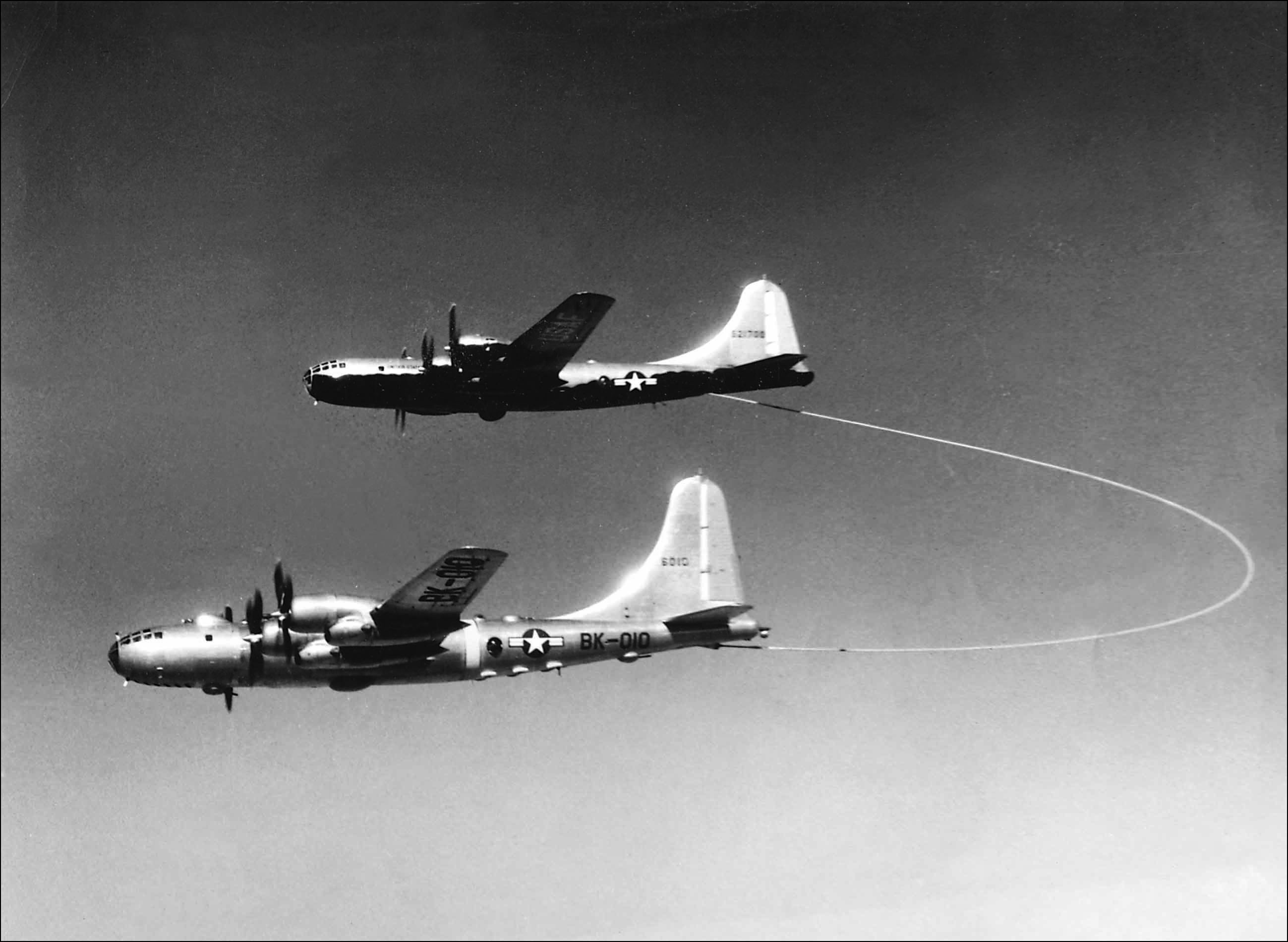
- Lucky Lady II (46-0010, below) being refuelled by a KB-29M (above)

General information
- Type: Boeing B-50A-5-BO Superfortress
- Owners: United States Air Force
- Construction number: 15730
- Serial: 46-0010

History
- In service: 1948–1950
- Preserved at: Planes of Fame Museum in Chino, California
- Fate: Badly damaged in accident – fuselage preserved

Lucky Lady II is a United States Air Force Boeing B-50 Superfortress that became the first airplane to circle the world nonstop. Its 1949 journey, assisted by in-flight refueling, lasted 94 hours and 1 minute.

== 1949: First circumnavigation of the world ==
The Lucky Lady II was a B-50 of the 43rd Bombardment Group, equipped with 12 .50-caliber (12.7mm) machine guns. For its circumnavigation mission, a fuel tank was added in the bomb bay for extra range. The mission required a double crew with three pilots, under the command of Capt. James Gallagher. The crews rotated in shifts of four to six hours.

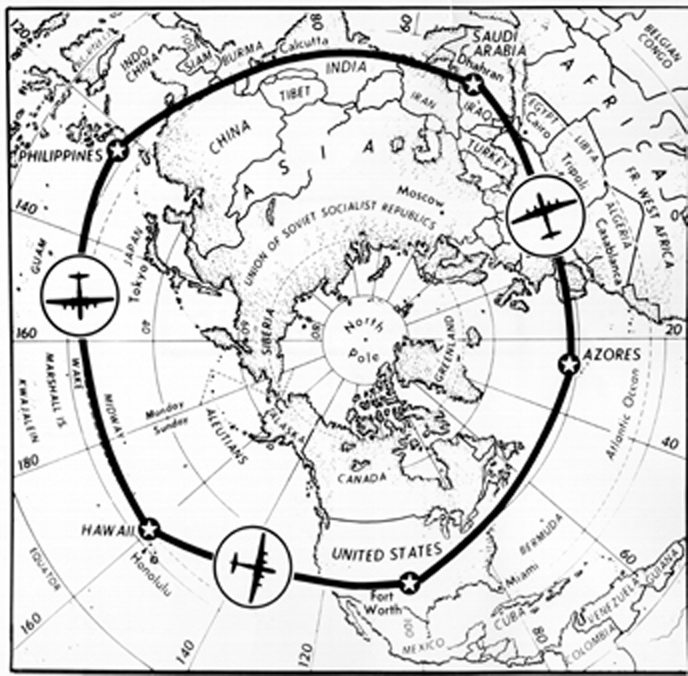
Lucky Lady II flight map

Bearing a total crew of 14, the aircraft started its round-the-world trip at 12:21 p.m. on February 26, 1949. It took off from Carswell Air Force Base near Fort Worth, Texas, and headed east toward the Atlantic Ocean.

After flying 23,452 mi (37,742 km), the aircraft passed the control tower back at Carswell on March 2 at 10:22 am, marking the end of the circumnavigation, and landed there at 10:31 a.m. after having been in the air for 94 hours and one minute, landing two minutes before the estimated time of arrival calculated at take-off.

En route, the aircraft was refueled four times by KB-29M Superfortresses, near Lajes Air Base in the Azores, Dhahran Airfield in Saudi Arabia, Clark Air Base in the Philippines, and Hickam Air Force Base in Hawaii, using the soon-to-be obsolete grappled-line looped-hose technique. Following the refueling near Luzon, Philippines, the refueling tanker encountered poor weather conditions and crashed on March 1, 1949, killing all nine crew aboard; the accident report was altered to state the tanker was on a routine training mission to keep the accident from casting a bad light on the Lucky Lady II's successful circumnavigation.

The aircraft flew at altitudes between 10,000 to 20,000 ft (3,000 to 6,100 m) and completed the trip around the world at an average ground speed of 249 mph (401 km/h; 216 kn).

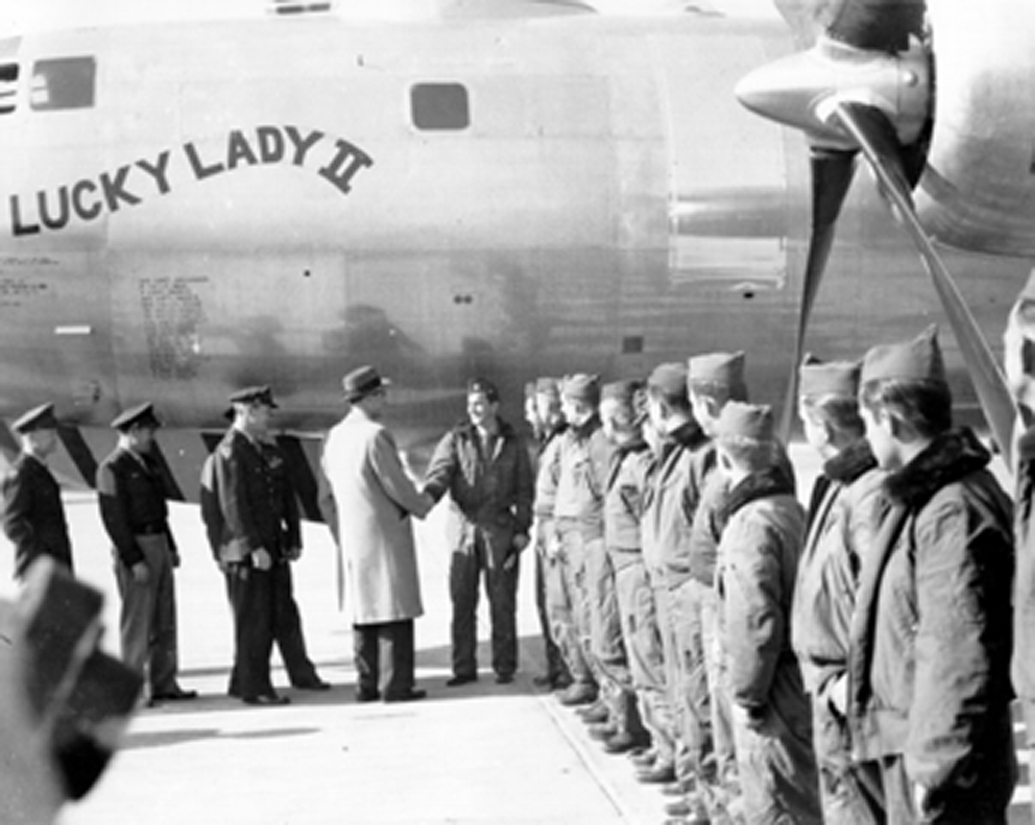
Lucky Lady II crew members are greeted by Air Secretary Stuart Symington and General Hoyt Vandenberg

General Curtis LeMay, Strategic Air Command's commanding general, was on hand to greet Lucky Lady II upon its arrival, together with dignitaries including Secretary of the Air Force W. Stuart Symington, Air Force Chief of Staff General Hoyt S. Vandenberg, and Major General Roger M. Ramey, commanding general of the Eighth Air Force. LeMay said the mission showed that the Air Force could send bombers from the United States to "any place in the world that required the atomic bomb". He also said mid-air refueling could also be used for fighter aircraft. Symington noted that aerial refueling would "turn medium bombers into inter-continental bombers".

The aircraft's crew were each awarded the Distinguished Flying Cross and were honored by the National Aeronautic Association with its annual Mackay Trophy, recognizing the outstanding flight of the year and by the Air Force Association with its Air Age Trophy.

Another B-50 named Global Queen had taken off on February 25 with the same mission, but was forced to land at Lajes Air Base in the Azores due to an engine fire. Altogether, five B-50As were lined up by LeMay for the task in anticipation that at least one would succeed, and only four weeks were given to prepare the crews and logistics.

== Other aircraft named Lucky Lady ==
Lucky Lady II was the name of a B-17 of the 338th Bomb Squadron, which was shot down near Tielrode, Belgium, on 30 July 1943.

Lucky Lady II was also one of three similarly named aircraft, each of which was part of a historic circumnavigation on behalf of the United States Air Force:

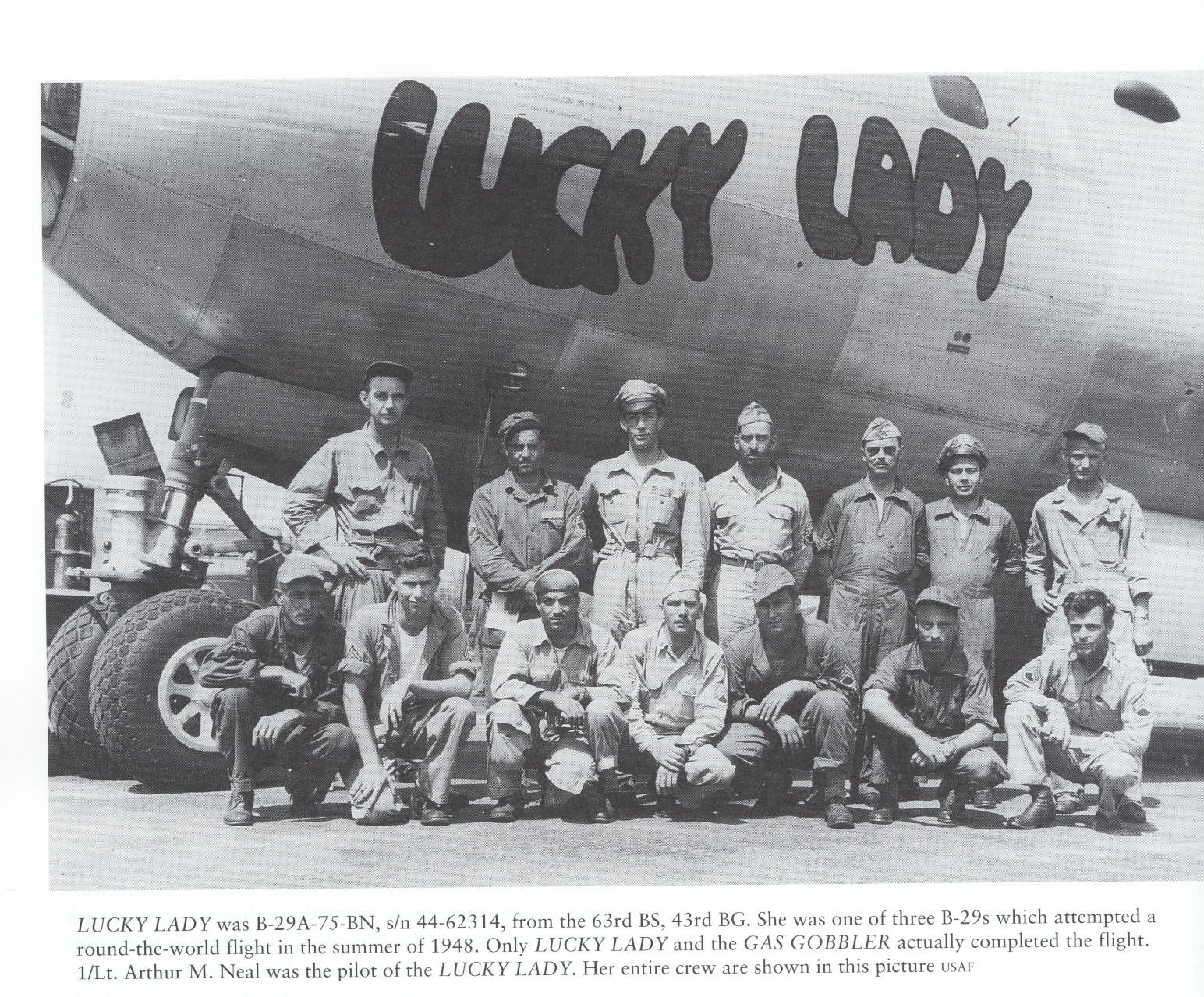
Lucky Lady I crew members

Lucky Lady I was one of three Boeing B-29 Superfortresses that attempted a round-the-world trip in July–August 1948, flying from and back to Davis-Monthan Air Force Base in Arizona. One B-29 crashed in the Arabian Sea.

Lucky Lady I, commanded by First Lieutenant A.M. Neal, together with Gas Gobbler, commanded by Lieutenant Colonel R.W. Kline, completed the 20,000 mi (32,000 km; 17,000 nmi) flight in 15 days, after making eight stops along the way and flying for 103 hours and 50 minutes.

Lucky Lady III was one of three Boeing B-52 Stratofortresses that made the circumnavigation in January 1957 as part of Operation Power Flite, flying from Castle Air Force Base in California and completing the 24,325 mi (39,147 km; 21,138 nmi) flight in 45 hours and 19 minutes (at an average ground speed of 536 mph (863 km/h; 466 kn)) with the assistance of aerial refueling from KC-97 Stratofreighters. Eight years after Lady II, Lady III made the trip around the world in less than half the time required by Lucky Lady II.

== Status ==
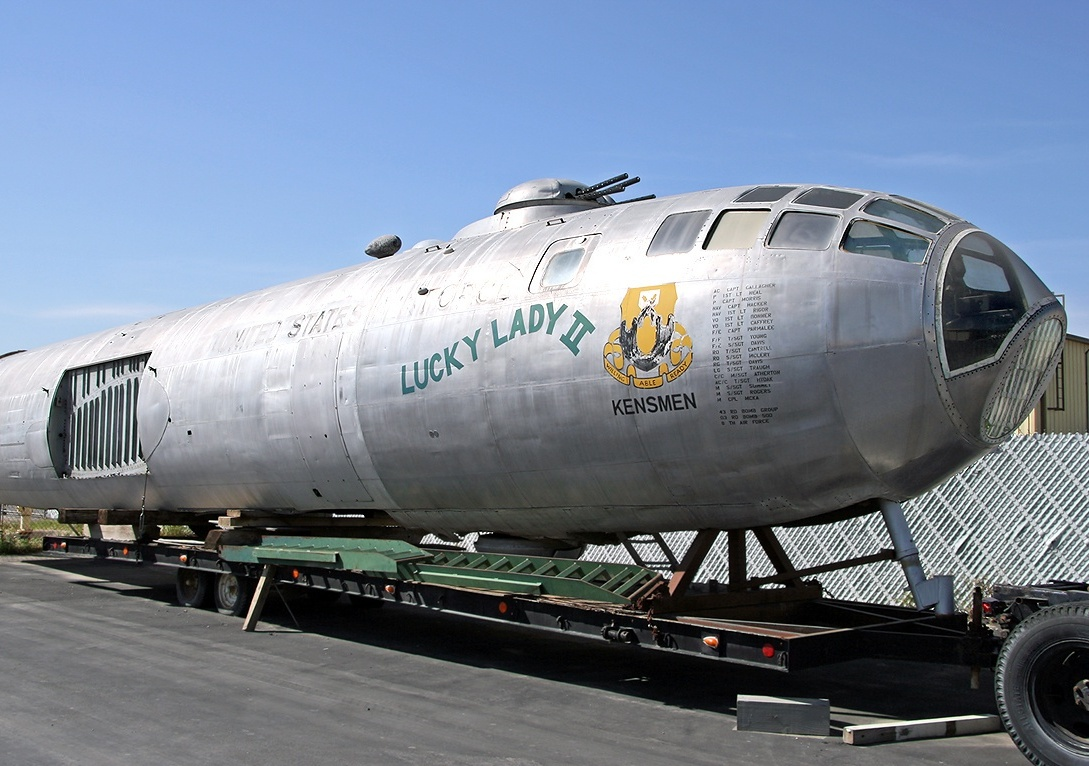
Lucky Lady II in 2002

The plane later suffered an accident, and only the fuselage was preserved. The fuselage of the aircraft, designated B-50A-5BO 46-0010, is on display at Planes of Fame Museum in Chino, California.

== See also ==
- Operation Power Flite – B-52 around-the-world simulated bombing mission in 1957, with a total time airborne of 45 hours and 19 minutes
- Coronet Bat – B-1B around-the-world bombing mission in 1995, with a total time airborne of 36 hours and 13 minutes
