= Oakley G. Kelly =

United States Air Force officer

Oakley George Kelly
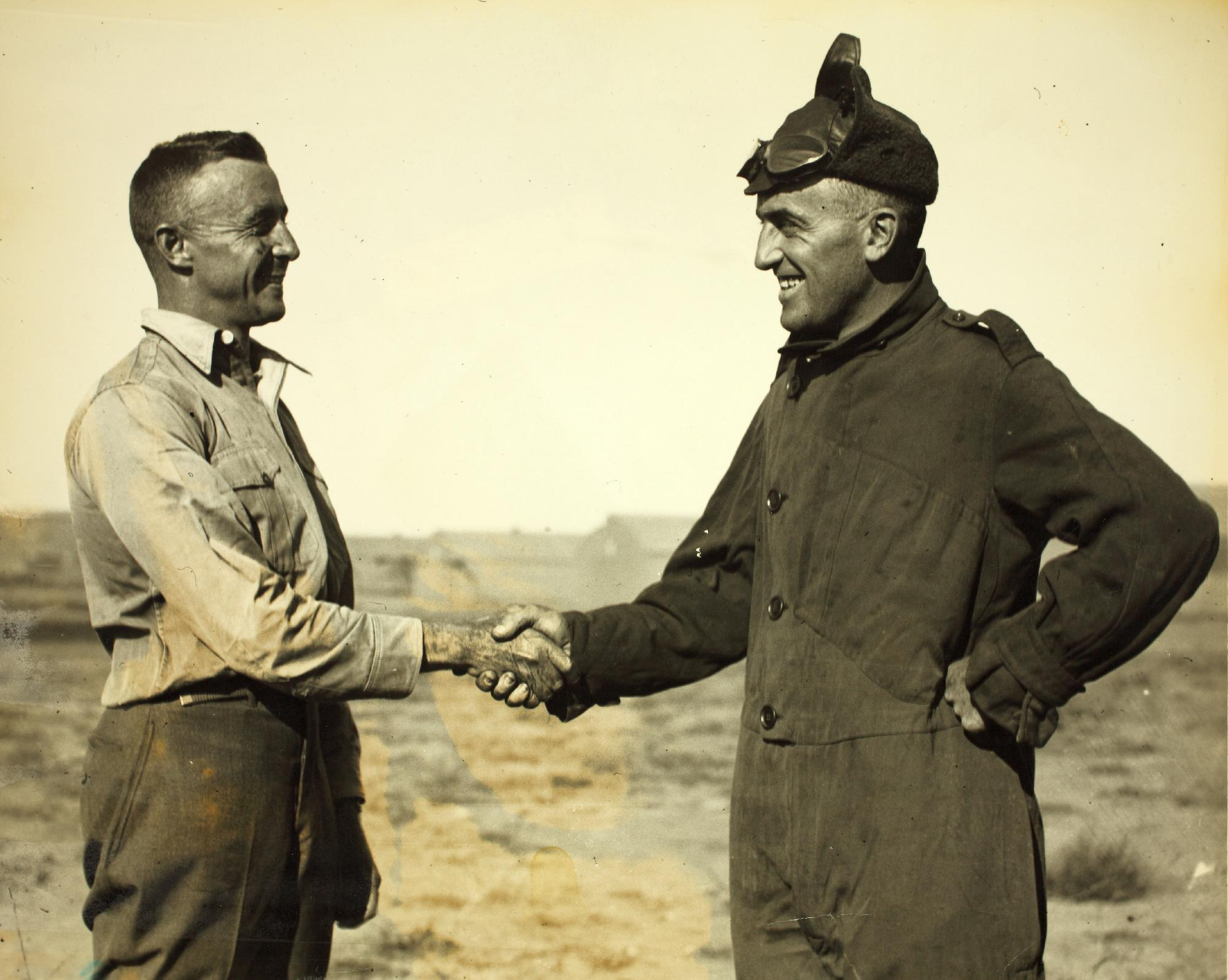
- Born: December 3, 1891; Geneva, Pennsylvania, U.S.
- Died: June 5, 1966 (aged 74); San Diego, California, U.S.
- Military career
- Allegiance: United States
- Branch: United States Air Force
- Rank: Colonel
- Commands: 321st Observation Squadron (1924 – 1929)
- Awards: Mackay Trophy (1922 – 1923)

Oakley George Kelly (December 3, 1891 – June 5, 1966) was a record setting pilot for the United States Army Air Service.

== Biography ==
He was born on December 3, 1891, in Geneva, Pennsylvania and grew up in Grove City.

In May 1922, Lieutenant Oakley G. Kelly and Lieutenant John Arthur Macready were awarded the 1922 Mackay Trophy for the beating the world's air endurance record and staying aloft for 36 hours, 4 minutes, and 32 seconds.

On May 2, 1923, Lieutenants Kelly and Macready departed in their single-engined, high-wing Army Fokker T-2 from 2,625 miles (4,225 km) from Mitchel Field, New York, and landed in San Diego, California, on May 3 after a flight of 26 hours, 50 minutes and 38 3/5 seconds, setting the record for transcontinental flight by a heavier-than-air craft winning the 1923 Mackay Trophy.

In October 1924, Kelly piloted Ezra Meeker along portions of the Oregon Trail to generate support for marking and preserving the historic route using a de Havilland DH.4 biplane. Traveling by air at 100 mph, Meeker traveled the same distance in an hour that had taken him a week to travel by ox at 2 mph.

Between 1924 and 1929, Kelly was the squadron commander for the 321st Observation Squadron at Pearson Field, Vancouver, Washington. In 1926 he flew virtually the entire production of the Fort Vancouver Centennial half dollar from San Francisco to Vancouver where they were sold as part of a celebration.

Kelly retired from military service as a Colonel on March 31, 1948. He died at age 74 in San Diego, California, in 1966.
