= Paul Verrees =

Belgian painter and poster designer

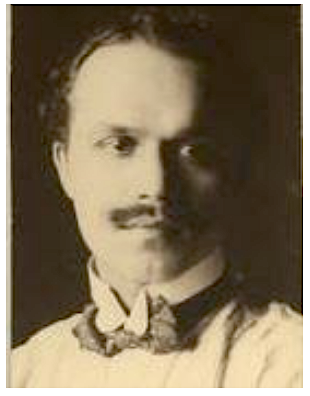
Verrees before 1923

Jozef Paul Verrees (1889–1942) was a Belgian painter, teacher, poster designer and etcher. During the First World War, he worked in the United States as a poster designer for the American war effort.

== Biography ==
Born in Turnhout, Jozef Paul Verrees studied architectural drawing at the Royal Academy of Fine Arts in Antwerp (Nationaal Hoger Instituut voor Schone Kunsten Antwerpen, NHISKA) from 1906 to 1908 under the direction of Juliaan De Vriendt (1842–1935) and Charles Mertens (1865–1919), as well as engraving in the workshop of Piet Verhaert, then in that of Frans Lauwers (1854–1931), who taught him the art of etching, where Verrees would prove himself remarkably gifted. Verrees worked alongside Lauwers until 1911. He collaborated with the Flemish newspaper Ons Volk Ontwaakt.

In May 1914, he presented his engravings at the triennial salon of the General Exhibition of Fine Arts at the Palais du Cinquantenaire in Brussels. After the start of the First World War, wounded during the first combats, he was evacuated to Scotland where he crossed paths with Frank Brangwyn. Verrees then left for the United States. He became known as an etcher by joining the Brooklyn Society of Etchers in 1915, as well as the Chicago Society of Etchers. He provides illustrations for American periodicals such as The Century Magazine and The Garden Magazine. From April 1917, recruited by the Division of Pictorial Publicity, he executed propaganda posters targeting Germany and serving to mobilize the American war effort (Join the Air Service and serve in France in 1917; What Are You Doing? Can Vegetables, Fruit and the Kaiser Too in 1918 for the National War Garden Commission). All his work is signed "J. Paul Verrees".

After the war, he returned to Belgium, settled in Westmalle, and became professor and director in 1929 of the Turnhout art school. Verrees died in 1942.

== Gallery ==
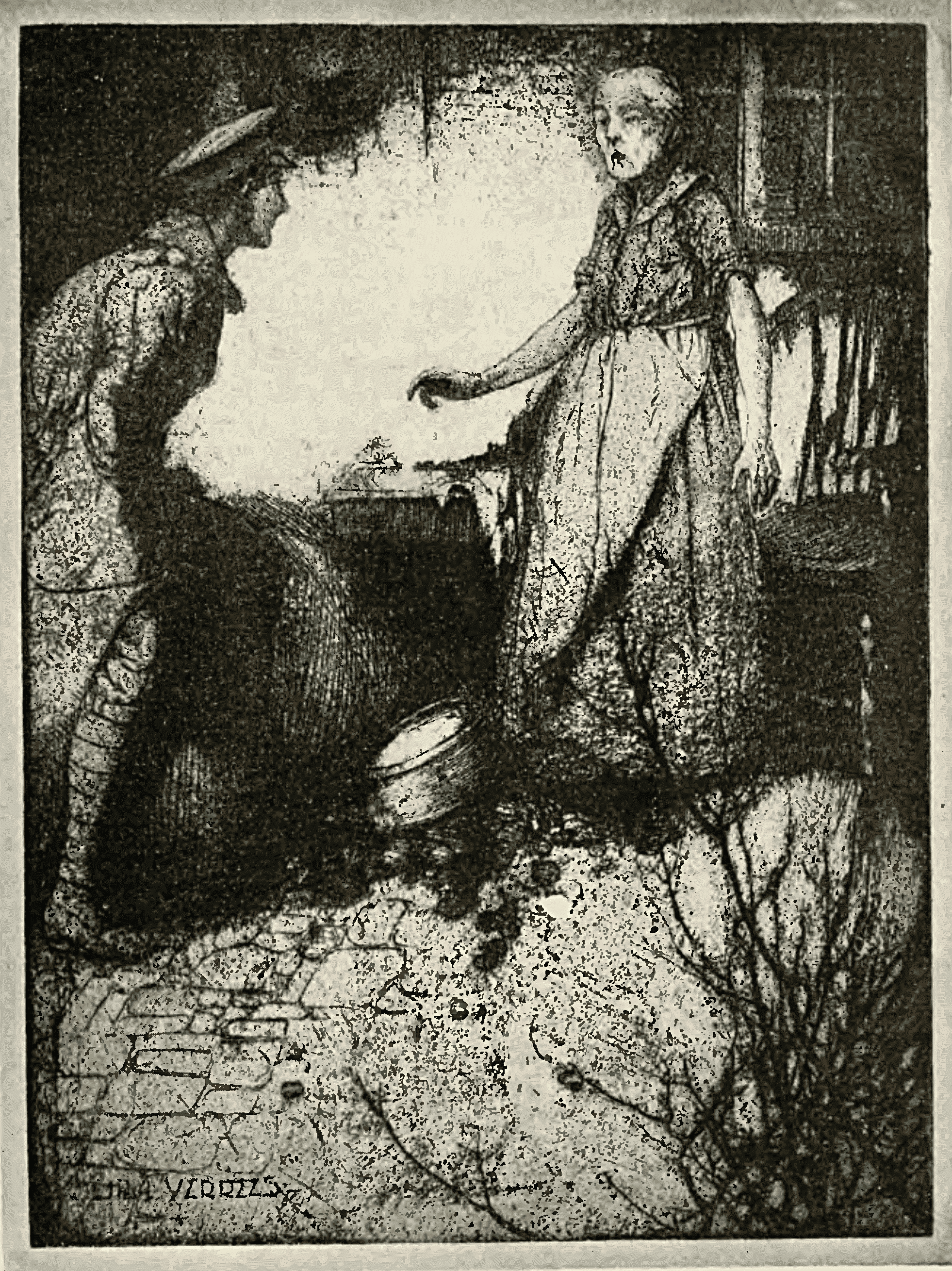
Them Others (1917)

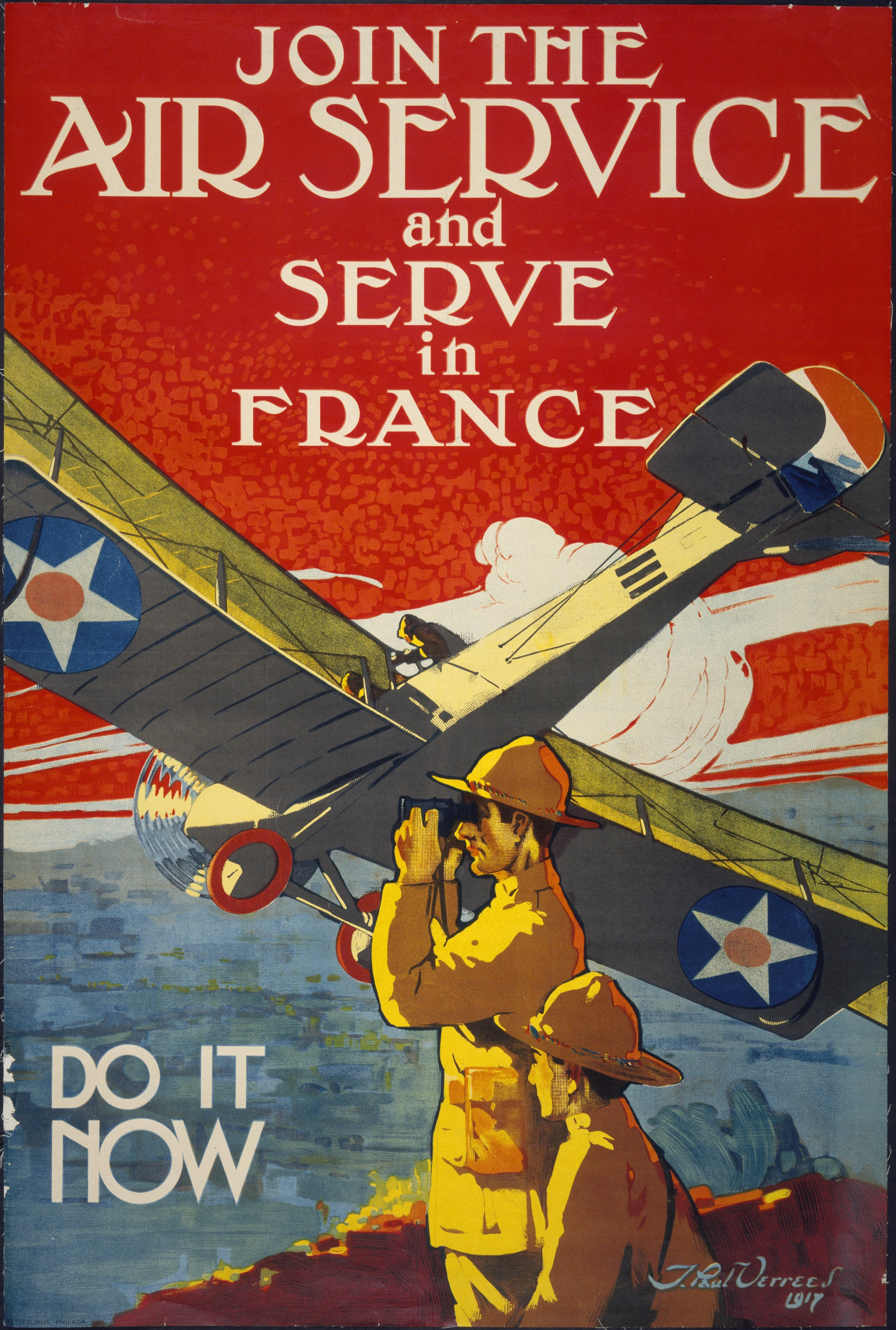
Join the air service and serve in France (1917)

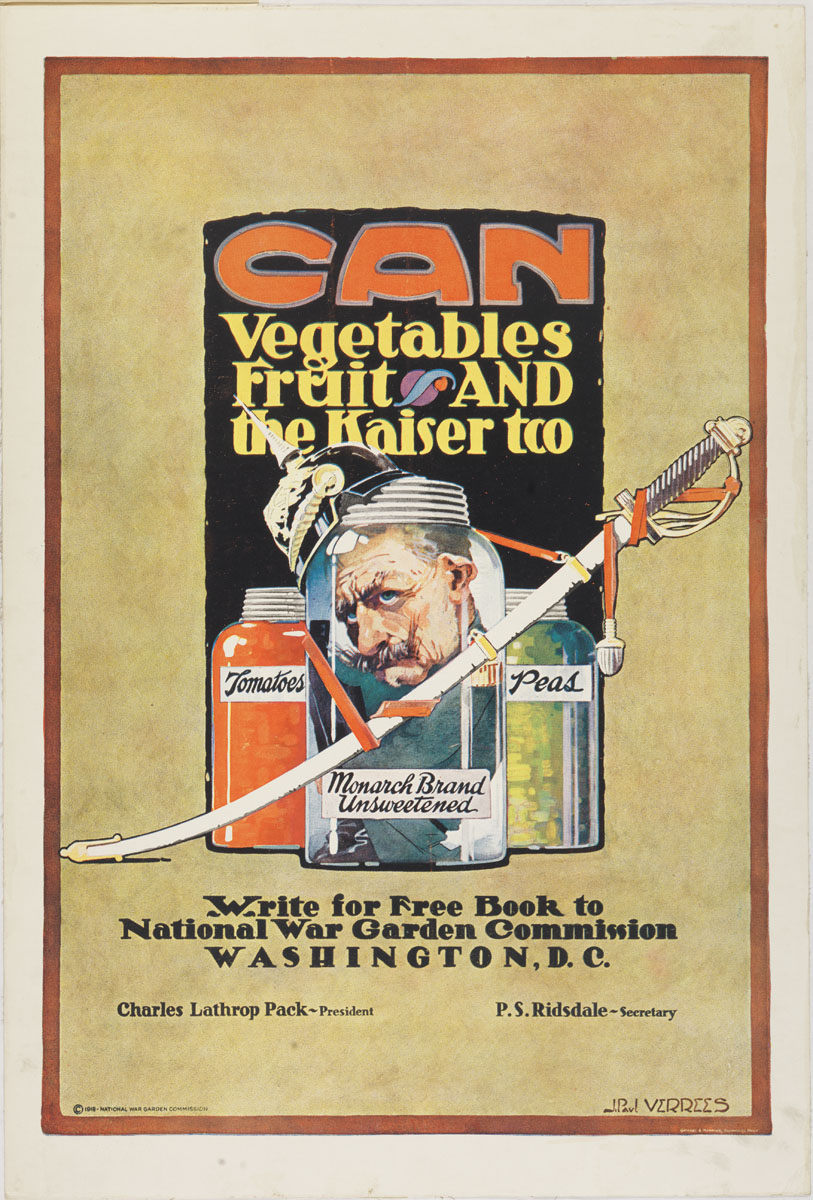
Can Vegetables, Fruit and the Kaiser Too
