= Verville Racer Aircraft =

Verville Racer Aircraft can refer to

- Verville-Packard R-1 - Verville VCP modified to use in the Pulitzer Trophy races
- Verville-Sperry R-3
