= Mayea Boat & Aeroplane Works =

- Type: Private company
- Industry: Wooden boat building
- Founded: 1911
- Founder: Louis T. Mayea
- Headquarters: Fair Haven, Michigan
- Area served: Worldwide
- Products: Mays Craft power boats
- Website: Mayea Boats

Mayea Boat & Aeroplane Works is an American wooden boat builder based in Michigan. The company was founded in 1911 by Louis T. Mayea and represents the oldest family-run custom mahogany speedboat builder/designer in the United States. While all other early wooden speedboat builders have changed owners, shut their doors, or turned to fiberglass construction, Mayea Boat & Aeroplane Works continues the wooden speedboat tradition with direct lineage to the company's founder.

== History ==
Louis T. Mayea started building boats in 1893 when he was 15 years old. In 1907 he became the Superintendent of the newly formed Detroit Launch & Power Company. The company was incorporated in Detroit, Michigan by John F. Hacker, father of the now well-known boat designer John L. Hacker.

In 1908 the company roles were listed as: John F. Hacker, President; Louis T. Mayea, Vice President and Superintendent; and John L. Hacker, General Manager.

The company designed and built launches, sailboats, hydroplanes and cruisers up to 60'. In 1911 The Detroit News reported that the company had designed and built the fastest step bottom hydroplane in the United States, named Kitty Hawk II. That same year the company gained attention after designing and building the first successful pontoons for Russell Alger's Wright Brothers Model B plane. Frank Trenholm Coffyn used the hydroplane in 1912 to take off and land on the Hudson River, enabling him to capture aerial video of the New York skyline for the first time in history.

By September 1911 Louis T. Mayea had taken control of the company and renamed the firm to Mayea Boat Works. The new company's advertisements touted their ability to build launches, hydroplanes and cruisers up to 100' in length. In 1916 the General Aeroplane Company commissioned Mayea Boat Works to build a line of mahogany, two-passenger, biplane flying boats. The planes were named Verville Flying Boats after their designer, Alfred Verville. They were the first Michigan-designed and built planes sold to the U.S. Navy. That same year the company was renamed to Mayea Boat & Aeroplane Works and relocated to Fair Haven, Michigan.

During the Great Depression the American economy slowed, as did the luxury boat business. The company was somewhat better positioned then other boat manufactures as it had remained a family-run business able to survive on building a small number of custom boats. In order to stay solvent the company also began building fast custom bootleggers for local rum-runners to smuggle booze the short distance from Canada to Detroit. The outbreak of World War II helped put the company on more solid footing. Louis' sons, Louie and Herbert, produced three experimental military boats for a joint venture between Gray Marine Motors and General Motors: the 49' GM2, the 53' GM3, and a 65' troop huller named GM6. GM3 was powered with four GM 6-71 diesels, making it the fastest diesel-powered boat in the United States.

In 1946 the first Mayea boat branded as a Mays Craft was design and built. The company continued designing and building one-of-a-kind custom wooden boats through the years for customers such as William Andrew Fisher of Fisher Body.

=== Today ===
Mayea Boat & Aeroplane Works is run by third and fourth generation Mayeas. Mixing new technology with tradition handed down by their fathers and grandfathers, the company still designs and builds custom one-of-a-kind mahogany boats up to 60' in length. The Mayea family constructs one to two boats per year. The last boat to be built was a custom designed and built 47' mahogany runabout. It is thought to be the world's largest custom diesel-powered varnished mahogany runabout. The boat's amenities include hand-wrapped ostrich skin seats, black ebony inlaid teak floors, 850 horsepower Italian Sea Tec diesels and custom fabricated stainless steel hardware.
