= Verville Sport Trainer AT =

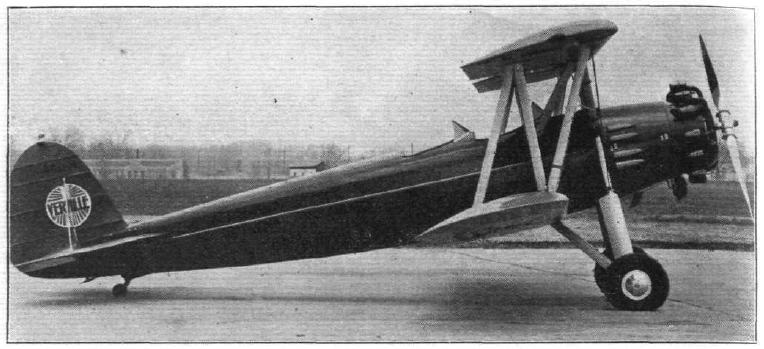

General information
- Type: military trainer & civilian luxury plane
- Manufacturer: Verville Aircraft Company
- Designer: Alfred V. Verville
- Primary user: private & USAAC
- Number built: 11 (sportsman), 4 (YPT, military)

History
- First flight: 1930

The Verville Sport Trainer AT is a two-seat tandem biplane designed by Alfred V. Verville as a civilian version of the YPT-10 primary trainer, intended to appeal to the wealthy private owner.

The White Aircraft Company bought the rights to the AT in 1939.

== Civilian version ==
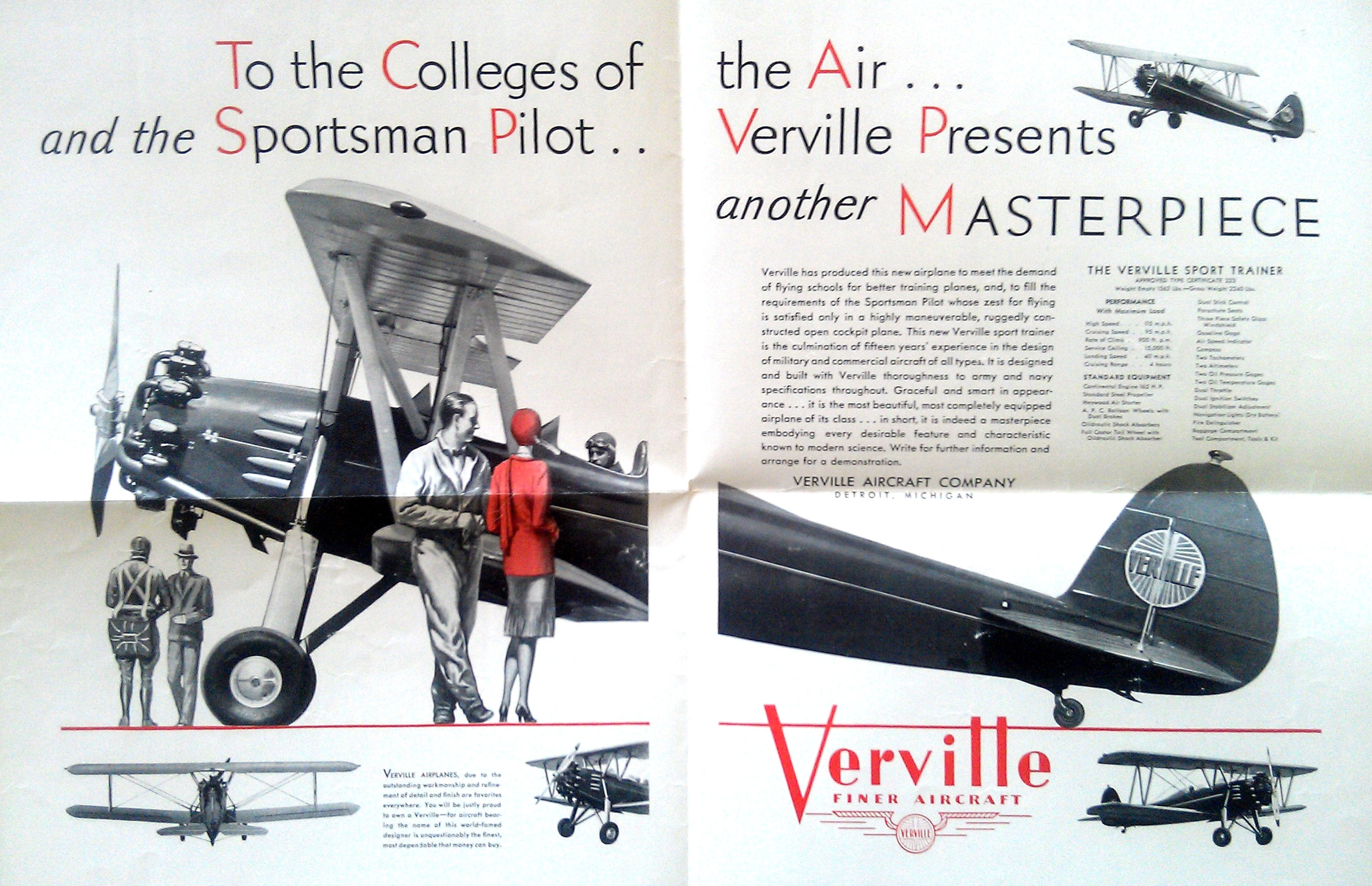
Advertisement for the Verville Sport Trainer AT

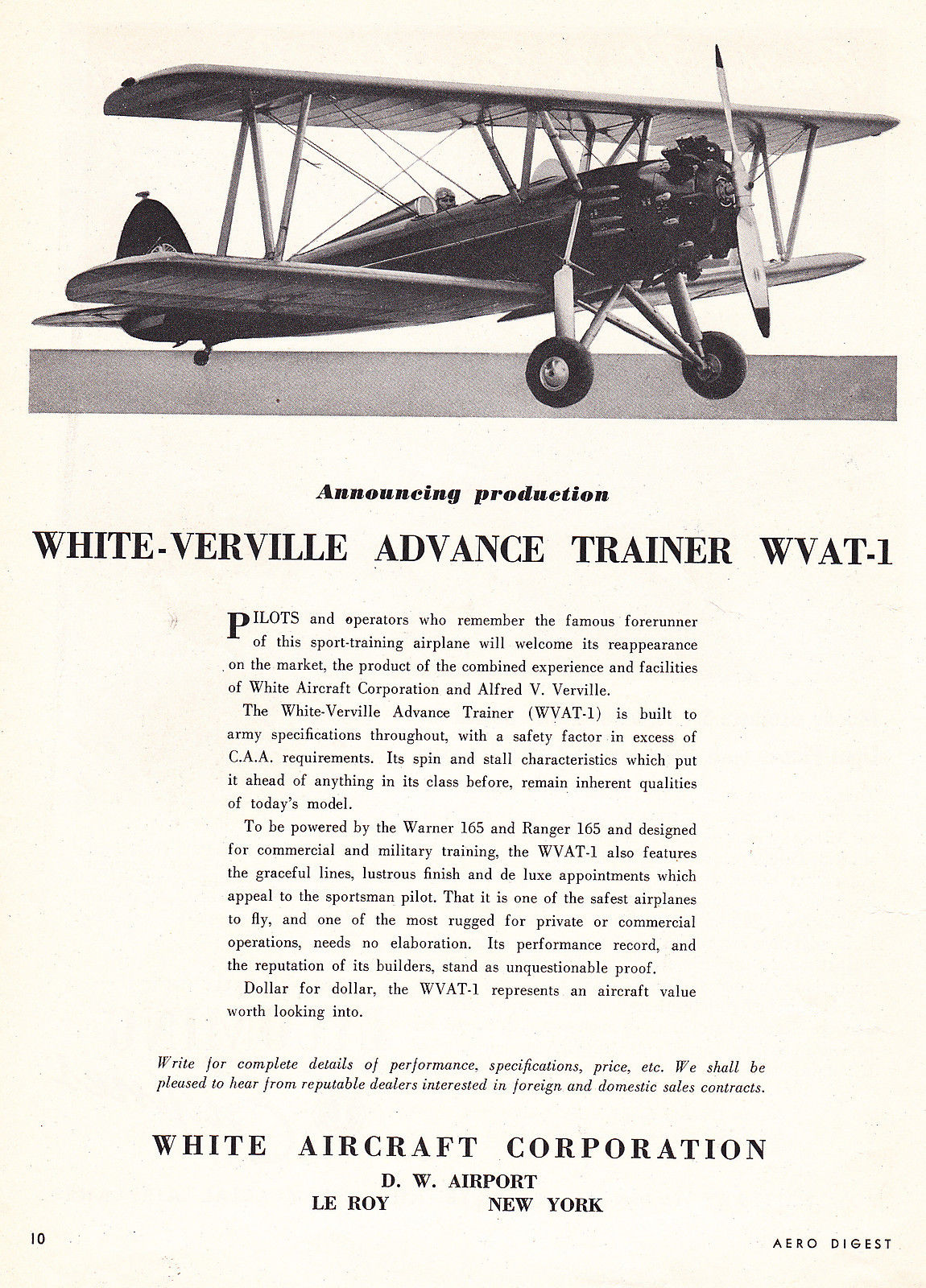
Advertisement of the White-Verville Advanced Trainer (WVAT-1) from 1939, just after White purchased the rights to the design.

The Sportsman, as it was also known, offered excellent flight characteristics and good stability, due in part to the design of the lower wing. With leather trim, battery with starter, and navigation lights, the Sport Trainer sold for $5,250. There were 10 manufactured. The owner of serial number one was Eugene Francis May.

One AT was built for NACA testing in 1930, and was designated the AT-4. It had modified wide landing gear with added fittings for pontoons, which may or may not have been used. The colors were a blue fuselage, silver wings, yellow stripe. Special equipment included: EDO pontoon fittings with structural bearing, steel interplane struts. On 31 January 1931, test pilot Lou Meister bailed out of this plane after entering an unrecoverable spin. He died when his parachute did not fully deploy after bailing out.

One AT was modified in 1931 for Lycoming Manufacturing Company of Williamsport, Pennsylvania. It was designated the LT Sportsman. It was fitted with a 210 hp Lycoming R-680.

Kenneth Parker, the son of George Safford Parker, founder of Parker Pen Company owned an AT.

== Military version - trainer ==
The USAAC purchased 4 YPT-10's and tested with 5 different engine versions resulting in YPT-10 thru YPT-10D designations. It had a 165 hp engine and could produce top speed of 120 mph, which was not faster than other aircraft of that era, but was more than adequate for the flight training purposes of the Army.

== Specifications ==
Data from U.S. Civil Aircraft Vol. 4

General characteristics

- Crew: 2
- Length: 24 ft 3 in (7.39 m)
- Wingspan: 31 ft 0 in (9.45 m)
- Height: 8 ft 9 in (2.67 m)
- Wing area: 242 sq ft (22.5 m^{2})
- Airfoil: Clark Y-15
- Empty weight: 1,562 lb (709 kg)
- Gross weight: 2,240 lb (1,016 kg)
- Fuel capacity: 35 US gal (29 imp gal; 130 L)
- Powerplant: 1 × Continental A70 seven-cylinder air-cooled radial piston engine, 165 hp (123 kW)

Performance

- Maximum speed: 115 mph (185 km/h, 100 kn)
- Cruise speed: 100 mph (160 km/h, 87 kn)
- Range: 370 mi (600 km, 320 nmi)
- Service ceiling: 15,000 ft (4,600 m)
- Rate of climb: 850 ft/min (4.3 m/s)
- Time to altitude: 10 minutes to 6,500 ft (2,000 m)

Other specs

- Heywood air starter
- dual A.P.C. brakes

== See also ==
- Alfred V. Verville
