= Alfred V. Verville =

American aviation pioneer and aircraft designer

Alfred Victor Verville
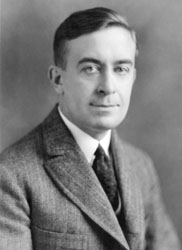
- Verville in 1925
- Born: 16 November 1890; Atlantic Mine, Michigan, US
- Died: 10 March 1970 (aged 79); La Jolla, California, US
- Other names: Fred Verville
- Occupations: aviation designer, aeronautic engineer
- Known for: Pioneering contributions to civil and military aviation design
- Spouse: Eva
- Parent(s): Victor Verville; Fabianna Miron

Alfred Victor Verville (November 16, 1890 – March 10, 1970) was an American aviation pioneer and aircraft designer who contributed to civilian and military aviation. During his forty-seven years in the aviation industry, he was responsible for the design and development of nearly twenty commercial and military airplanes. Verville is known for designing flying boats, military racing airplanes (such as the record breaking Verville-Sperry R-3), and a series of commercial cabin airplanes. His planes were awarded with the Pulitzer Speed Classic Trophy in 1920 and 1924.

Verville was a founder of three aeronautical companies, the General Aeroplane Company, Verville Aircraft Company, and the Buhl Aircraft Company. He worked for General Billy Mitchell during his service at the United States Army Air Service from 1918 to 1925. From 1937 to 1945, he worked as a consultant for companies such as Douglas Aircraft, Curtiss-Wright, Snead Aircraft, and Drexel Aviation. Verville spent the next sixteen years in the U.S. federal government, primarily in the Bureau of Aeronautics, before retiring in 1961.

Verville received many honors and awards, including a selection as a fellow of the Smithsonian Institution's National Air and Space Museum in 1962. An airmail stamp was issued in 1985 by the US Postal Service in Verville's honor. In 1991, he was posthumously inducted into the Michigan Aviation Hall of Fame.

== Early life and career ==
Verville was born in Atlantic Mine, a small town in Michigan's Upper Peninsula, on November 16, 1890, as the son of Victor Verville and Fabianna Miron. As a child, his mother bought him a Conyne-style box kite from Sears Roebuck, which captured his imagination and started his interest in flight and aviation. Verville also began reading stories about the Wright brothers in newspapers and magazines with great interest. Later he even wrote to the Wrights and Glenn Curtiss and received responses.

Verville Flying Boat (1916)

After graduating from Adams Township High School, Verville took a correspondence course in electrical engineering. He moved to Detroit, Michigan, at the age of twenty, and from 1910 to 1913 he worked in the electrical departments of the Detroit Edison Company, Ford Motor Company, and Hudson Motor Car Company. By 1913, Verville had made his mind up that he wanted to learn to fly. William Edmund Scripps, the editor and owner of The Detroit News, introduced Verville to Glenn Curtiss in July 1913. Curtiss encouraged Verville to apply for his spring 1914 flight school. Instead, Verville went to Hammondsport, New York, in February 1914, where Curtiss Aeroplane Company was located, and told Curtiss he wanted to work as an apprentice in his drafting and engineering shop. Curtiss agreed and this began Verville's aviation career.

I always had that wonderful feeling in flying, no matter what kind of weather ... I just wondered why men hadn't learned to fly years ago, it was so wonderful ... It was a symphony.

— Alfred Verville describing his first flight as a passenger in a plane, c. 1913 (age 23).

Verville excelled as a draftsman and designer, but still wanted to attend flight school and to become an exhibition pilot. After applying and being passed over three times for the Curtiss Flying School, Verville went to Curtiss, who responded: "No, Mr. Verville you don't want to be a pilot. We can get all the pilots we want. What we want are designers. You're [really] a designer and you don't know it." While at Curtiss Aeroplane, Verville took an active part in the development of the transatlantic flying boat America (which was a Curtiss H-2) and the Curtiss Jenny of World War I fame. In the fall of 1914, Verville left the company and joined the Aeromarine Plane and Motor Company in New Jersey; shortly thereafter, he joined the Thomas-Morse Airplane Company. In March 1915, he returned to Detroit and joined the General Aeroplane Company, where he led his first full design and build to his specifications, the Verville Flying Boat.

On July 9, 1917, Verville married Bertha M. Kamrath in Escanaba, Michigan. He had three children with her, daughters Betty and Janet, and son Myron. Also in 1917, Verville left the General Aeroplane Company to become executive engineer of Fisher Body Corporation, where he supervised the construction of de Havilland DH-4 airplanes.

== U.S. Army service ==
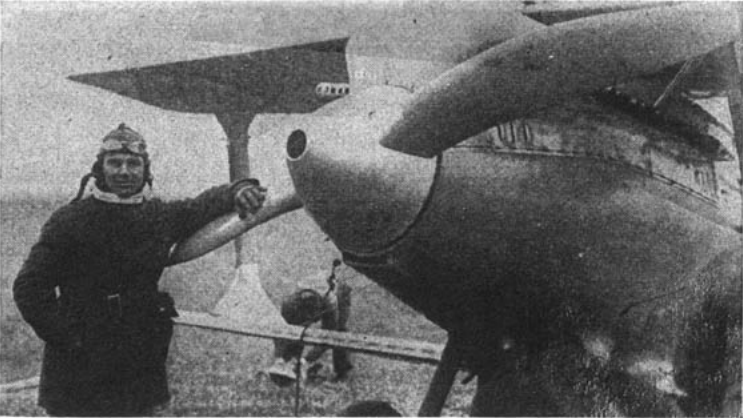
Photo of C. C. Mosley, who piloted the R-1 to victory at the 1920 National Air Races in New York.

In June 1918, Verville joined the Engineering Division of the U.S. Army Air Service (USAAS) as a civilian, and was based out of the USAAS Engineering Division at McCook Field in Dayton, Ohio. In 1920, the young engineer gained national prominence when his Verville-Packard R-1 won the Pulitzer Speed Classic Trophy at the first held National Air Races (at Roosevelt Field, New York) by finishing first out of twenty four other planes, achieving a top speed of 156.54 mph.

In 1919 Brigadier General Billy Mitchell requested the Engineering Division to design a light-weight "motorcycle of the air" that could operate as a liaison between Army field units. Verville completed the Messenger design in early 1920. The Lawrence Sperry Aircraft Company of Farmingdale was contracted to build five Messengers in April 1920. The first Messenger flight was on November 1. Later designated the Verville-Sperry M-1 Messenger, the plane is notable for its small size, simple construction, and inexpensive cost, which made it ideal for testing and experimentation. The National Advisory Committee for Aeronautics used one in its pioneering aerodynamic research programs from 1923 to 1929. Sperry modified twelve into the radio-controlled Messenger Aerial Torpedo and developed the apparatus for a Messenger to make the first successful airship hook on and release in December 1924.

Following World War I, in the capacity as an engineering advisor, Verville joined General Billy Mitchell and his aide, Lieutenant Clayton Bissell, on their sailing trip to Europe in December 1921. The three men toured France, Italy, Germany, Holland, and England in order to check on the European progress of aviation. From their research they produced a 206-page report, which was published as a U.S. Army Air Service Information Circular. General Mitchell asked Verville to incorporate some of the European developments they had observed and to produce a plane for the U.S. Army Air Service's participation in the upcoming 1922 National Air Races.

The resulting plane, the Verville-Sperry R-3, was the second plane to utilize retractable landing gear and incorporated many features advanced for its time. The completion of the R-3 encountered challenges because the planned Curtiss D-12 engine was not available. So, instead Verville had to use the problematic Wright H-3 (Hispano) engine, which had major vibration issues. Three R-3s competed in the 1922 National Air Races, but only one finished in 5th place with a top speed of 181 mph. After the 1922 race, Verville was able to finally obtain a Curtiss D-12 engine. It was installed on an R-3 and based on trials, it was determined that it could break a world record. On March 31, 1923, with Orville Wright officially observing from the ground, pilot Lieutenant Alexander Pearson Jr. set a 500 km world speed record of 167.73 mph (269.94 km/h) over a 10-lap course at Wilbur Wright Field. For the 1924 National Air Races, his R-3 won the 1924 Pulitzer Speed Trophy at 216 mph.

While at the Air Service, Verville was awarded eight aeronautical patents for technologies such as airplane truss design, radiator mounting, and an automatic gun mechanism.

== Buhl and Verville Aircraft Companies ==
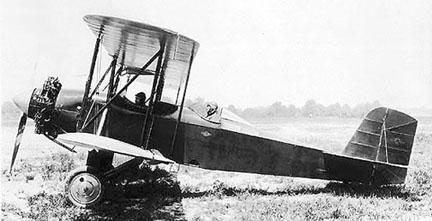
The CA-3 Airster was the first airplane awarded a type certificate (i.e. A.T.C No. 1)

In 1925, Verville left the government service to co-found the Buhl-Verville Aircraft Company with the Buhl family in Detroit. On March 29, 1927, Buhl was awarded the first Approved Type Certificate for its Buhl-Verville CA-3 Airster (i.e. A.T.C. No. 1) issued by the Aeronautics Branch of the Department of Commerce on March 29, 1927. There were a total of 20 of this aircraft manufactured and it broke a number of speed and endurance records, placing at the top of the Ford National Reliability Air Tour and the National Air Races. Verville was the chief designer from the company's founding in 1925 until 1927.

In 1928, Verville left Buhl-Verville to establish the Verville Aircraft Company, also in Detroit. The company sought to market planes to the wealthy private owner. Verville Aircraft produced the Verville Air Coach, a four-passenger, high-wing monoplane, which made its debut at the 1929 Detroit Air Show and the Verville Sport Trainer, a two-seat tandem biplane. The United States Army Air Corps purchased four Sport Trainers under the designation YPT-10. The USAAC tested with five different engine versions resulting in YPT-10 thru YPT-10D designations.

== Bureau of Air Commerce and consulting ==
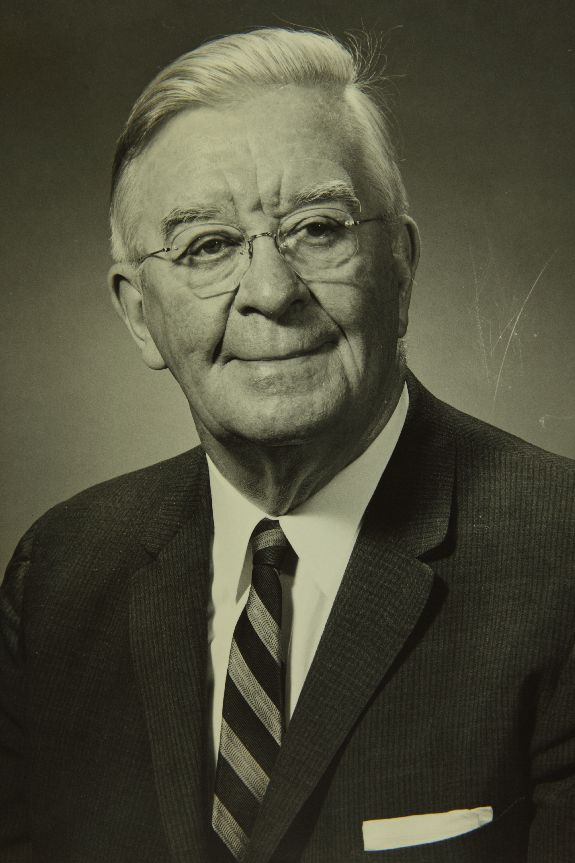
Alfred Verville while at the Bureau of Aeronautics (c. 1955)

Verville joined the Aeronautics Branch of the Department of Commerce in 1933. The Aeronautics Branch became the Bureau of Air Commerce in 1934. During his time there, Verville served in the following roles: aeronautical engineer; chief of the Manufacturing, Engineering, and Inspections Service; and finally assistant chief of the Aeronautic Development Section. In his role as chief of the Manufacturing, Engineering, and Inspections Service, he was in charge of the reviews for issuing type certificates for all manufactured airplanes.

Verville left government service to be a consultant for companies including Douglas Aircraft (1937–38), Curtiss-Wright (1941–42), Snead Aircraft (1942), and the Drexel Aviation Company (1942–45). Verville briefly returned to the Bureau of Air Commerce from 1939 to 1941.

== U.S. Navy service and retirement ==
In 1945, once again returning to government service, he joined as a member of the Naval Technical Mission to Europe, and later, the U.S. Navy's Bureau of Aeronautics (1946–1961). At the Bureau of Aeronautics, from 1950 until his retirement in 1961, Verville was a technical advisor and consultant to the director of the Technical Data Division. Verville retired in 1961 and moved to La Jolla, California.

== Death ==
He died on March 10, 1970, from a heart attack at age 79.

== Honors ==
In 1962, Verville was selected as a fellow of the Smithsonian's National Air Museum. He was honored with ten Certificates or Letters of Commendation from the U.S. Armed Forces. He was an honorary fellow of the Society of Experimental Test Pilots and was named an Elder Statesman of Aviation by the National Aeronautic Association in 1956. In 1961, he was elected as a fellow of the American Institute of Aeronautics and Astronautics. In 1991, he was posthumously inducted into the Michigan Aviation Hall of Fame.

The Smithsonian National Air and Space Museum established the Verville Fellowship in his name, which is a competitive nine-to-twelve month in-residence fellowship for researching the history of aviation. Over 20 boxes of material from Verville's estate are housed at the Smithsonian Air and Space Museum's Garber Facility. A 33 cent United States Postal Service airmail stamp was issued on February 13, 1985, bearing Verville's name, picture, the text "Aviation Pioneer", and an image of his Verville-Sperry R-3 low-wing monoplane.

== Planes designed by Verville ==
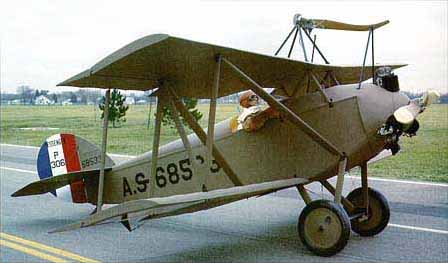
U.S. Army Air Corps Verville-Sperry M-1 Messenger at the National Museum of the United States Air Force

Over the course of his forty-seven years in designing and building planes, Verville contributed to the design and development of nearly twenty different aircraft. A plane he designed, the Verville-Sperry M-1 Messenger is on permanent exhibition at the National Air and Space Museum's Steven F. Udvar-Hazy Center. Another plane he designed, the Verville-Sperry R-3 won first place at the 1924 Pulitzer Trophy Races. In June 1961, it was honored as one of the twelve most significant aircraft of all time by Popular Mechanics and it was featured on a USPS airmail stamp issued in 1985.

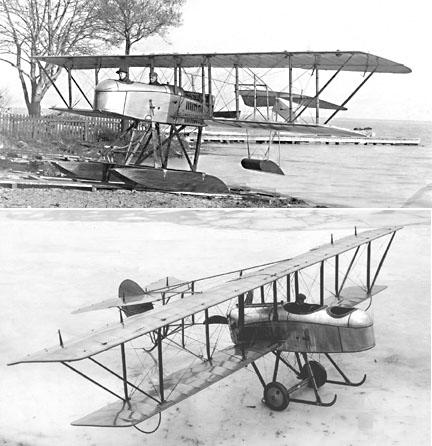
Verville's 2nd and 3rd Plane while at General Aeroplane Company Top: Gamma S, Two-blade prop and twin floats Bottom: Gamma L, Wheeled with four-blade prop

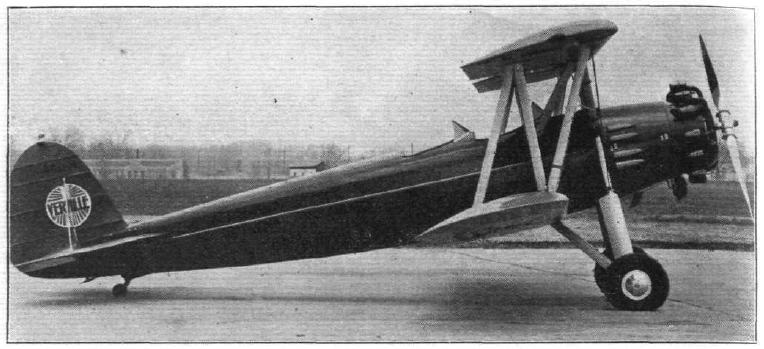
Verville Sport Trainer

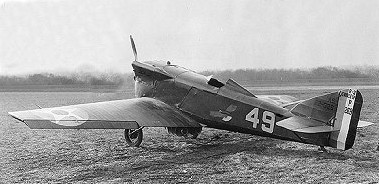
Verville R-3

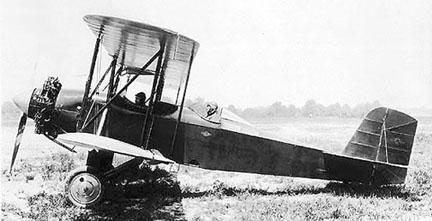
Buhl-Verville CA-3 Airster

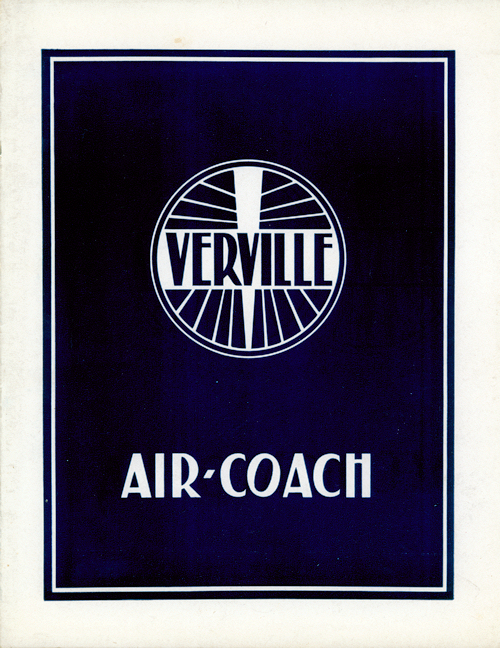
Verville Air Coach promo cover

=== Curtiss Aircraft Company ===
Curtiss Jenny (1914)

- famous World War I plane
- Verville contributed to design

America (1914)

- first plane of Curtiss H-2 line
- planned to be first transatlantic flight, but interrupted by WWI
- transatlantic flying boat

=== General Aeroplane Company ===
Verville Flying Boat (1916)

- 2 passenger, open cockpit, biplane, flying boat
- 100 hp Curtiss OX-5 or Maximotor pusher
- Mahogany hull and wing floats constructed by Mayea Boat Company (Detroit)

Gamma S (1917)

- A two-seater, open cockpit, floatplane, biplane with an 80 hp Le Rhône pusher engine.

Gamma L (1917)

- Similar to Gamma S, with wheels.
- Twin floats were replaced with wheels for winter operations off the ice of Lake St. Clair.

=== U.S. Military ===
Verville-Clark-Pursuit 1 & 2 (1920)

- Function: fighter (also known as VCP-1/2)
- Two VCP-1 and two VCP-2 built
- VCP-1 re-designated VCP-1A & R-1, VCP-2 redesignated PW-1 & PW-1A
- While at the Engineering Division and Aeronautical Systems Center of the Signal Corps – post-World War I: November 11, 1918-September 1919

Verville-Packard R-1 (1920)

- Function: racing; crew: 1; engines: 1x 638 hp Packard 1A-2025 V-12
- On November 27, 1920, Captain C. C. Moseley, flying a Verville-Packard VCP-R, won the Pulitzer Trophy Race at Mitchel Air Force Base. with a maximum speed of 177 miles per hour (285 km/h).
- While in the Air Service

Verville-Sperry M-1 Messenger (1921)

- Function: messenger, manufactured by Sperry Aircraft Company
- This plane is exhibited in the National Air and Space Museum's Steven F. Udvar-Hazy Center.

Verville-Sperry R-3 (1922)

- Participated in the 1922 and 1924 Pulitzer Trophy Races; won first place in 1924. In June 1961, it was honored as one of the twelve most significant aircraft of all time by Popular Mechanics.

Engineering Division TP-1 (1923)

- Was a two-seat biplane fighter designed by Alfred V. Verville and Virginius E. Clark at the United States Army Air Corps Engineering Division.
- Prototype TP-1 was built as the XTP-1 and tested at McCook Field in 1923.

YPT-10 (1925), Primary Trainer

- Similar design to Verville Sport Trainer AT
- While at the Air Corps

=== Buhl-Verville ===
Buhl-Verville CA-3/CW-3 Airster (1925–1926)

- CA-3 Airster, 200 hp Wright J-4 engine
- CA-3A Airster, 225 hp Wright J-5 engine
- CW-3 OX5 Airster, 90 hp Curtiss OX-5 engine
- CW-3 Wright Trainer, 220 hp Wright J-5 engine (short military trial)
- Also known as: J4/J5 Airster or B-V Airster

=== Verville Aircraft Company ===
Verville Air Coach (1929)

- four passenger, high-wing cabin monoplane designed in 1927 by Verville
- Model 102 (104-W, Warner Engine)
- Model 104-C
- Model 104-P (Packard Diesel Coach)

Verville Sport Trainer (1930)

- This plane is in storage in the Smithsonian Institution system; its engine was a Packard DR-980.

== See also ==
- List of people on stamps of the United States
- List of United States airmail stamps
- Sperry Corporation
