= General Aeroplane Company =

Airplane manufacturing company in Detroit, United States

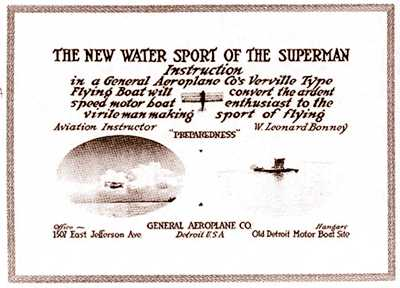
- Type: Private
- Founded: Detroit, U.S. (February 10, 1915)
- Founder: Corwin Van Husen; Fred and Russell Alger
- Defunct: August 28, 1918
- Fate: Dissolved
- Headquarters: Detroit, Michigan, United States
- Key people: Alfred V. Verville, Herbert B. and Frank P. Book, Wm. Hendrie, Jerome H. Remick

The General Aeroplane Company was Detroit's first commercial airplane builder. GAC built three types of aircraft during the First World War and operated a flying school. The aircraft were the Verville Flying Boat, the Gamma S biplane with floats (floatplane), and the Gamma L biplane with wheels. All had engine installations driving pusher propellers.

== Founding ==
The key player in the company was 18-year-old Corwin Van Husen, who was supported by his guardian W. Howie Muir and other key players of Detroit and Grosse Pointe society. Other major investors included Fred and Russell Alger (who were also investors in the Wright Company and had demonstrated the Wright craft at the Grosse Pointe Country Club four years earlier), Herbert B. and Frank P. Book, Wm. Hendrie, and Jerome H. Remick.

In November 1915, the GAC hired 24-year-old Alfred V. Verville, an experienced airplane designer who would be a part of Detroit's aviation activities for years to come. Design of the company's first airplane, a two-passenger biplane flying boat, was completed in December and construction of the hull was begun by the Mayea Boat & Aeroplane Works.

The flying boat was flight tested during early 1916 and was advertised nationally for sale beginning in September. The U.S. Navy purchased the plane as a trainer, the first built-in-Detroit airplane sold for profit.

With U.S. involvement in World War One imminent, Verville began designing a military airplane, the Gamma. By November 1916, the prototype, a "pusher" type plane with the engine and propeller behind the crew, was fitted with seaplane floats and test flown from its base on the Detroit River. In the meantime, the leading industry magazine Aviation gave the GAC plane a boost by running a two-page story about the as yet unproved craft. For the winter the Gamma was fitted with wheels to replace the floats. On its maiden flight from frozen Lake St. Clair, a wind blew the Gamma into a snow bank, and it crashed. The pilot, William Bonney was unhurt, but the Gamma was destroyed.

== Dissolution ==
On August 28, 1918, GAC ceased operations.

== Aircraft ==
- Verville flying boat (a.k.a. Beta), 1916
  - 2 passenger, open cockpit, biplane flying boat
  - in the style of a Curtiss Model F
  - 100 hp Curtiss OX-5 or Maximotor pusher
  - span: 38 ft length: 27 ft 8 in, load: 600 lb
  - Mahogany hull and wing floats constructed by Mayea Boat Co (Detroit), three-bladed prop, engine mounted under top wing
  - the Navy purchased the plane for use as a trainer. Two more similar military pushers and two twin-engine seaplanes were ordered in March 1917
- Gamma S
  - biplane with floats (floatplane)
  - a two-seater, open cockpit, flying boat, biplane with an 80 hp Le Rhône pusher engine
- Gamma L
  - similar but with wheels
  - Twin floats were replaced with wheels for winter operations off the ice of Lake St. Clair

== Gallery ==
GAC Airplanes
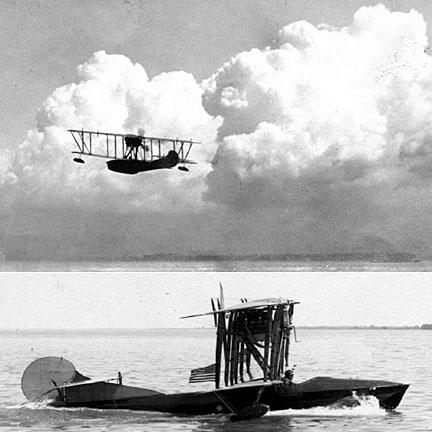
Verville Flying Boat

Illustration from a 1916 Flight magazine of the Verville Flying Boat (beta)

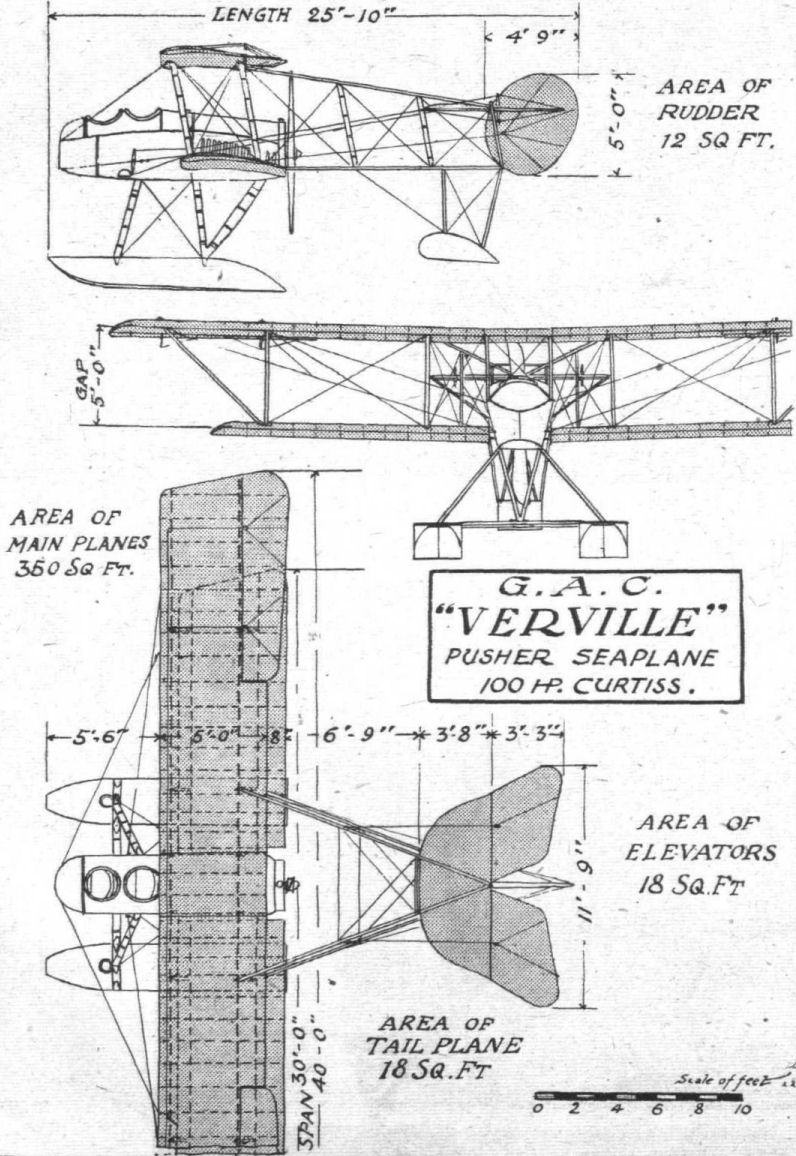
Verville Pusher Seaplane - Plan, front and side elevations to scale. c.1916

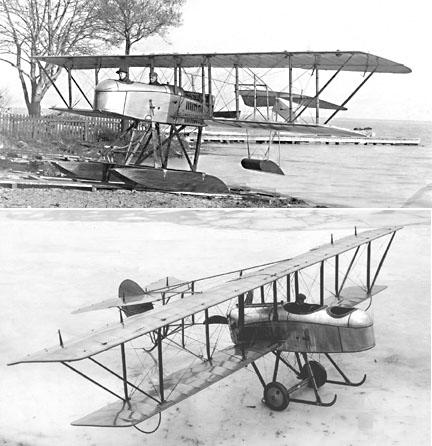
Gamma S (top), Gamma L (bottom)

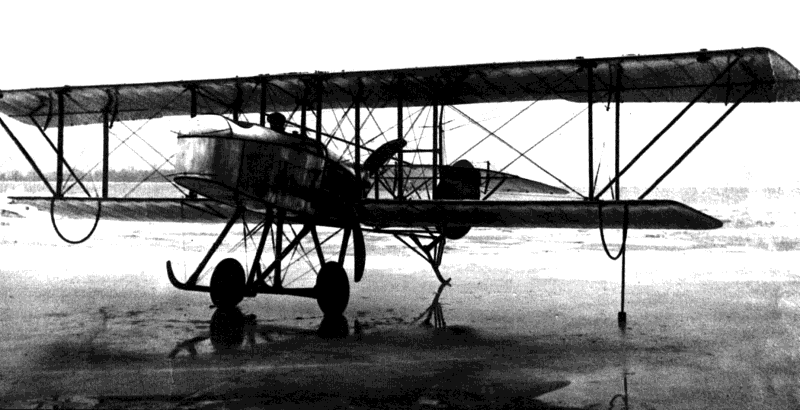
Gamma L

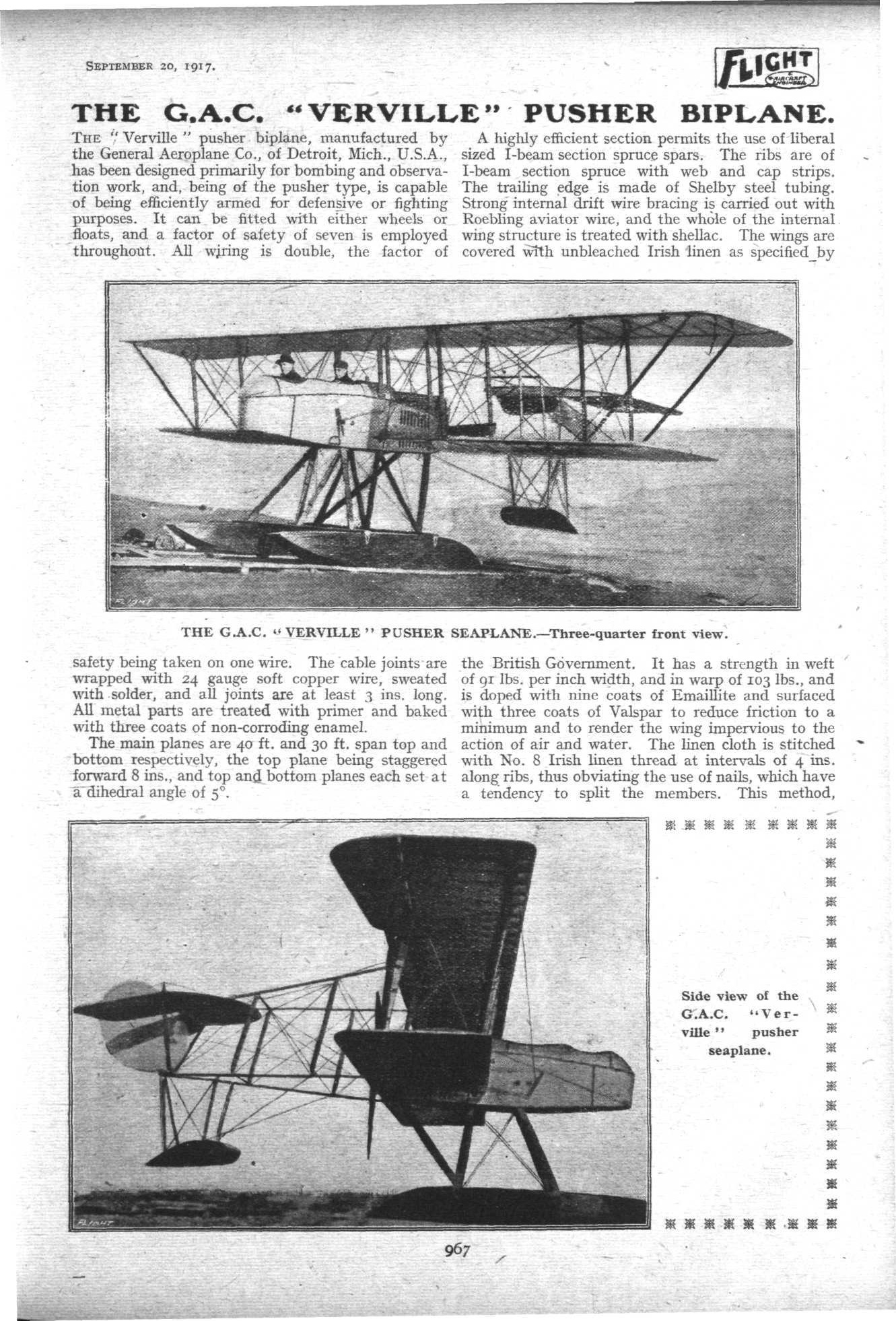
Gamma S Seaplane by Alfred Verville and General Aeroplane Company - 1917 in Flight Magazine

== See also ==
- Detroit, Michigan
- Alfred V. Verville
