= Verville Air Coach =

Four-passenger and high-wing monoplane

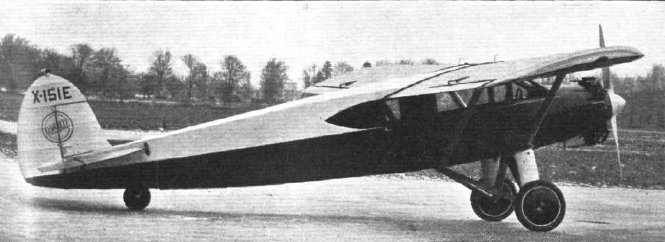

General information
- Type: Luxury coach
- Manufacturer: Verville Aircraft Company
- Designer: Alfred V. Verville
- Number built: 10-16

History
- Manufactured: 1929-1931
- First flight: 1929

The Verville Air Coach was a four-passenger, high-wing monoplane designed in 1927 by Alfred V. Verville and produced by his company, Verville Aircraft Company. It was a comfortable, good-looking cabin monoplane which sold for $10,500. The plane made its debut at the Detroit Air Show in 1929.

Sources disagree on the number manufactured, but only 10 to 16 were built before Verville declared bankruptcy in 1931 during the Great Depression.

== Details ==
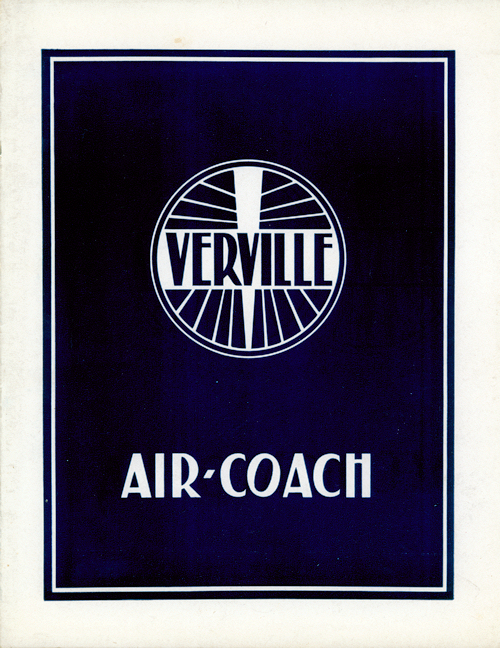
Verville Air Coach promo cover.

Powered originally by a 110-horsepower (82-kilowatt), 7-cylinder Warner Scarab, it then sported a 5-cylinder Wright J-6 of 165 hp (123 kW). Ultimately, the Air Coach was powered by the 7-cylinder Wright -6 of 225 hp (168 kW) as the Model 104-C, with Aircraft Type Certificate #267. At least six of this model were produced through 1931. It had a wing span of 44 feet (13.4 meters) with a Clark Y airfoil and had a length of 28 ft 9 in (8.8 m) and a useful load of 2,166 lb (982 kg), with a gross weight of 3,400 lb (1,542 kg). It had a maximum speed of 130 mph (209 km/h), a cruising speed of 110 mph (177 km/h), and a landing speed of 50 mph (80 km/h). It could be outfitted as a floatplane with Edo floats.

The fuselage and tail section were of steel-tube construction with a clever arrangement that eliminated awkward framing around the windows of the passenger compartment. The sponsons served as attachment points for both the landing gear and the forward wing struts, and also were storage for a toolkit, battery, and other miscellany. The wings were wood with aluminum ailerons and leading edge sheeting. The cabin was upholstered in mohair fabric in a style that rivaled the finest automobiles. Navigation lights, cabin and instrument lights, a metal propeller, and a choice of electric inertia starter or Heywood compressed air starter were all standard equipment.

The most interesting model of the Air Coach, produced later, was the Model 104-P, which was powered by a 9-cylinder Packard DR-980 diesel engine. Some evidence exists that a 104-P was sold in Italy.

== Variations ==
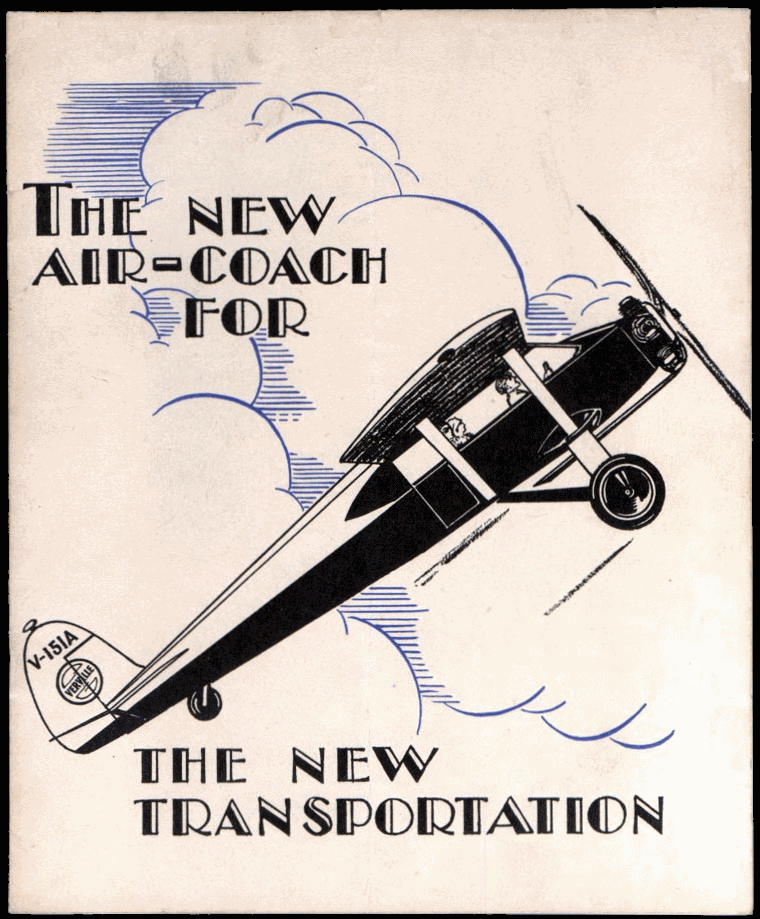
Verville Air Coach advertisement

- Model 102 (104-W, 110 hp (82 kW) Warner Engine)
  - Wing span: 40 ft (12.2 m)
  - Length: 28 ft (8.5 m)
  - Empty weight: 1,525 lb (692 kg)
  - Normal gross weight (loaded): 2,400 lb (1,089 kg)
  - Maximum speed: 110 mph (177 km/h)
  - Fuel capacity: 50 US gal (189 L; 42 imp gal)
  - Cruising range: 600 miles (521 nmi; 966 km)
  - Cost: $7,500
- Model 104-C (1928)
  - 1928 Aircraft Type Certificate (267, 2-306)
  - 4-passenger, high-wing cabin monoplane
  - with 110 hp (82 kW) Warner Scarab engine
    - Wing span: 40 ft (12.2 m)
    - Length: 28 ft (8.5 m)
    - Useful load: 875 lb (397 kg)
    - Maximum speed: 110 mph (177 km/h)
    - Landing speed: 45 mph (72 km/h)
    - Range: 600 miles (966 km)
  - with 225 hp (168 kW) Wright J-6 engine
    - Wing span: 44 ft (13.4 m)
    - Length: 28 ft 9 in (8.76 m)
    - Useful load 1,234 lb (560 kg)
    - Maximum speed: 130 mph (209 km/h)
    - Crusing speed: 110 mph (177 km/h)
    - Landing speed: 50 mph (80 km/h)
    - Range: 650 miles (1,046 km)
  - Semi-cantilever wing
  - Cost: $12,000
  - 2 built
- Model 104-P (Packard Diesel Coach) (1930)
  - Aircraft Type Certificate 316
  - 4-passenger, high-wing cabin monoplane
  - 225 hp (168 kW) 9-cylinder Packard DR-980 diesel engine
  - Length: 28 ft 8 in (8.7 m)
  - Useful load: 1,100 lb (499 kg)
  - Maximum speed: 130 mph (209 km/h)
  - Cruising speed; 110 mph (177 km/h)
  - Landing speed|: 50 mph (80 km/h)
  - Range: 640 miles (1,030 km)
  - Cost: $11,000-12,000
  - 1 built, modified from 104-C [NC70W]

== See also ==
- Alfred V. Verville
- Verville Aircraft Company
