= Verville VCP =

VCP-1
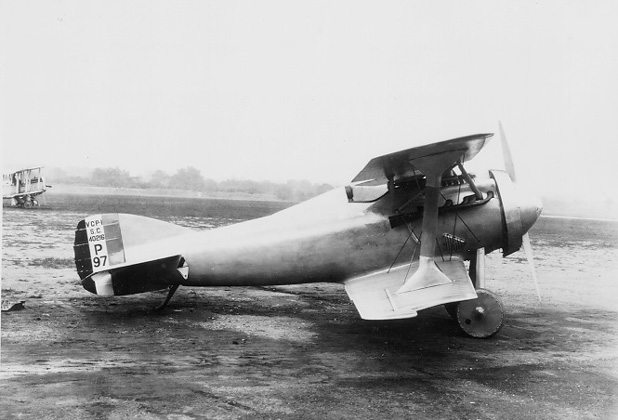

General information
- Type: USAAS Pursuit prototype
- Manufacturer: Engineering Division
- Designer: Alfred V. Verville
- Number built: 2

History
- First flight: 11 June 1920
- Variant: Verville-Packard R-1

The Verville VCP was an American single-engined biplane fighter aircraft of the 1920s. A single example of the VCP-1 was built by the United States Army Air Service's Engineering Division, which was later rebuilt into a successful racing aircraft, while a second, modified fighter was built as the PW-1.

== Design and development ==
=== VCP-1 ===
In 1918, Virginius E. Clark, in charge of the Plane Design section of the U.S. Army Air Service's Engineering Division and Alfred V. Verville, who had recently joined the Engineering Division from private industry, started design of a single-seat fighter (known as "pursuit" aircraft to the U.S. Army), the VCP-1 (Verville-Clark Pursuit).

Drawing from the experience of the French and their SPAD S.XIII, the desire was to make a sleeker and more maneuverable fighter. The VCP-1 was powered by a Wright-built 300 hp (220 kW) Hispano-Suiza 8 V-8 engine and had tapered single-bay biplane wings. The fuselage was a monocoque structure constructed of plywood, while the wings were of wood and fabric construction. The engine was cooled with an unusual annular radiator.

Two were built, but only one was flown, making its maiden flight on June 11, 1920. The aircraft demonstrated good performance, reaching 156 mph (251 km/h), but the radical annular radiator was unsuccessful, having to be replaced to a more conventional unit. Because of its performance, it was decided to modify the VCP-1 to a racing aircraft, replacing the Wright-Hispano engine with a 660 hp (490 kW) Packard 1A-2025 V12 engine, becoming the VCP-R (later again rebuilt as the Verville R-1 Racer).

=== PW-1 ===
In 1920, work commenced on two new fighter aircraft based on the VCP-1, featuring an easier to build fabric covered steel-tube fuselage instead of the plywood monocoque of the VCP-1. The aircraft retained the tapered wings of the VCP-1 and was powered by a 350 hp (260 kW) Packard 1A-1237 engine, cooled by a tunnel-style radiator located under the engine.

The new design was initially known as the VCP-2, but was soon redesignated as PW-1 (Pursuit, Water-Cooled) in the U.S. Army Air Service's new designation system. The first aircraft was used for static testing, while the second prototype flew in November 1921, reaching a speed of 146 mph (235 km/h). It was rebuilt later that year with a new untapered set of wings using a Fokker style thick airfoil, becoming the PW-1A, but performance was reduced, and the aircraft was refitted with its original wings, reverting to the designation PW-1.

While plans were prepared for more powerful versions fitted with revised wings, no production ensued.

== Operational history ==
The VCP-R made its racing debut at the 1920 Gordon Bennett Cup race held at Étampes near Paris on 28 September. Its radiator proved to be insufficient to deal with the powerful, high-compression Packard engine, however, and it retired after the first lap. It was taken back to the U.S. and quickly modified with a larger radiator for entry in the Pulitzer Trophy air-race, held at Mineola, New York on 25 November that year. This time it was successful, winning the race at a speed of 156.5 mph (251.9 km/h).

The U.S. Armed Forces did not compete in the 1921 Pulitzer Trophy race, but for the 1922 race the VCP-R was fitted with a revised tail, becoming the R-1. It finished in sixth place at a speed of 179 mph (288 km/h).

== Variants ==
VCP-1
Single-seat biplane fighter, powered by 300 hp Wright-Hispano engine. Two built, one flown.
VCP-R
Modification of VCP-1 for air-racing, with 660 hp Packard 1A-2025 engine, and capable of reaching a speed of 177 mph (285 km/h).
R-1
Modification of VCP-R for 1922 Pulitzer Trophy race. Maximum speed 186 mph (299 km/h).
PW-1
Modified fighter aircraft with steel-tube fuselage and 350 hp Packard 1A-1237 engine. Two built but only one flown.
PW-1A
PW-1 fitted with new, Fokker-style wings. Speed reduced to 134 mph (216 km/h).

== Specifications (PW-1) ==
Data from The American Fighter

General characteristics

- Crew: 1
- Length: 22 ft 6 in (6.86 m)
- Wingspan: 32 ft 0 in (9.75 m)
- Height: 8 ft 4 in (2.54 m)
- Wing area: 269 sq ft (25.0 m^{2})
- Empty weight: 2,069 lb (938 kg)
- Gross weight: 3,005 lb (1,363 kg)
- Powerplant: 1 × Packard 1A-1237 , 350 hp (260 kW)

Performance

- Maximum speed: 146 mph (235 km/h, 127 kn) at sea level
- Cruise speed: 132 mph (212 km/h, 115 kn)
- Endurance: 2 hr 30 min
- Service ceiling: 19,300 ft (5,900 m)
- Time to altitude: 11 minutes to 10,000 ft (3,050 m)
