= Verville-Sperry M-1 Messenger =

M-1 Messenger
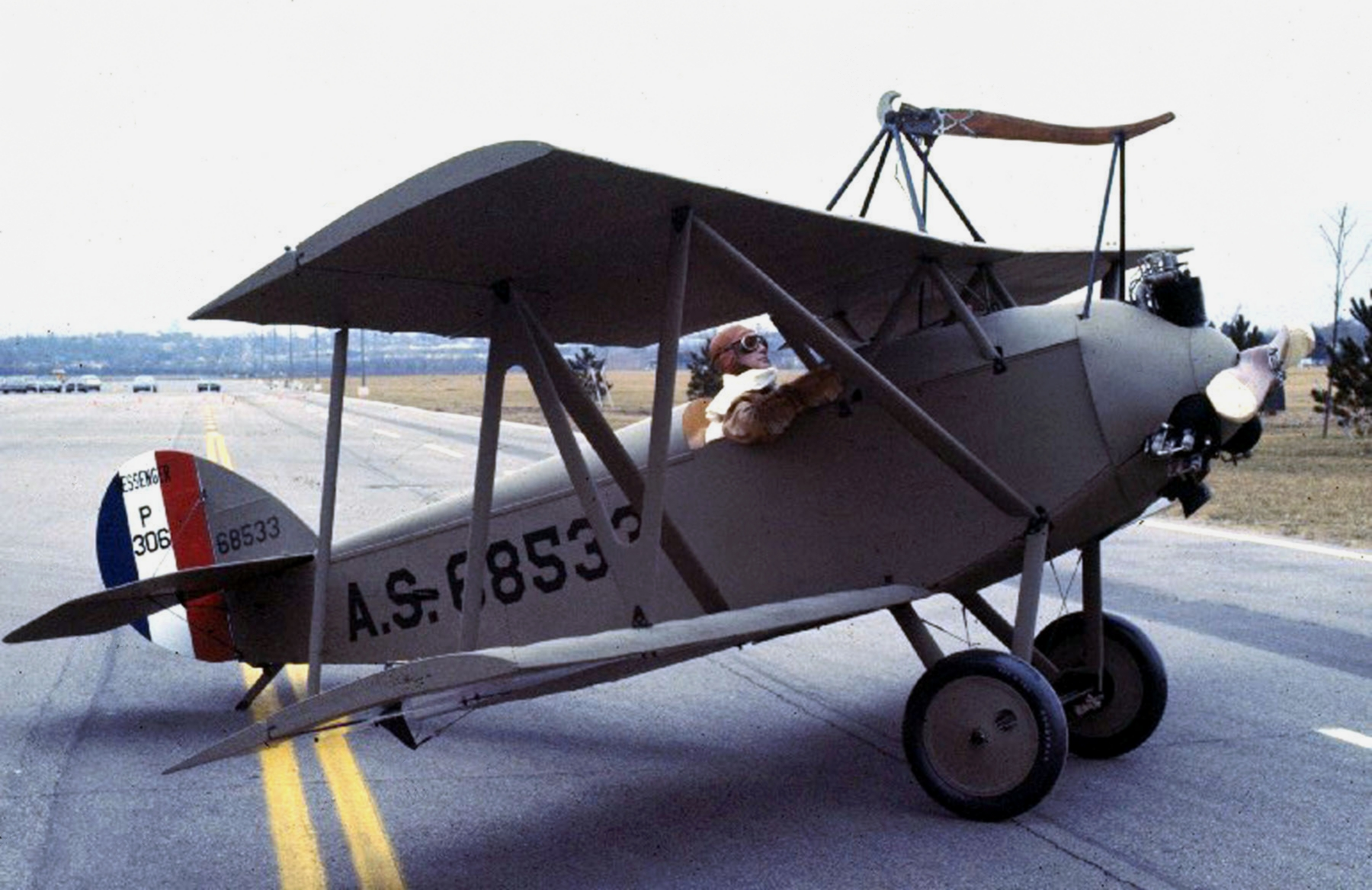

General information
- Type: Single-seat communications biplane
- Manufacturer: Sperry Aircraft
- Designer: Alfred Verville
- Primary user: United States Army Air Service
- Number built: 42

History
- First flight: 1921

The Sperry Messenger is an American single-seat biplane designed by Alfred V. Verville working for the Engineering Division of the United States Army Air Service (USAAS) and built under contract by Sperry Aircraft Company of Farmingdale, New York. The aircraft was later designated the M-1 and MAT by the USAAS. Sperry produced approximately 50 Messengers and the civilian two-seat version, the Sport Plane, between 1920 and 1926. The aircraft was the first to make contact between an airplane and an airship while in flight.

== Development ==
In 1921 Alfred V. Verville led the Engineering Division of the USAAS's design of a simple single-seat biplane to be used as a messenger aircraft to replace motorcycles. The aircraft was built by the Sperry Aircraft Company as the Sperry Messenger. The Messenger was a conventional biplane with a fixed tailskid landing gear and a nose-mounted 60 hp (45 kW) Lawrance L-4 radial engine. In 1924 the military aircraft were given USAAS designations M-1, M-1A and MAT. Lawrence Sperry gained attention when he landed his personal Messenger in front of the Capitol building and bounced up the front steps in Washington D.C. (See photo below.) He also successfully landed his little Messenger at the Lincoln Memorial. The prototype was used by Lawrence Sperry who disappeared in 1923, flying a Messenger across the English Channel from France to England.

In 1922, Lawrence converted the Messenger into a private sport plane, one that could be kept in an ordinary garage and was easy to fly. Lawrence demonstrated his new achievement in a dramatic way. Angered because the government was slow to make payments on his contracts, Lawrence fueled the plane and flew to Washington to strike a telling blow against the bureaucracy. Circling the Capitol at ground level to disrupt Congress, he landed directly on the Capitol steps and stormed into the office of the Assistant Secretary of the Navy.

Sperry at Capitol
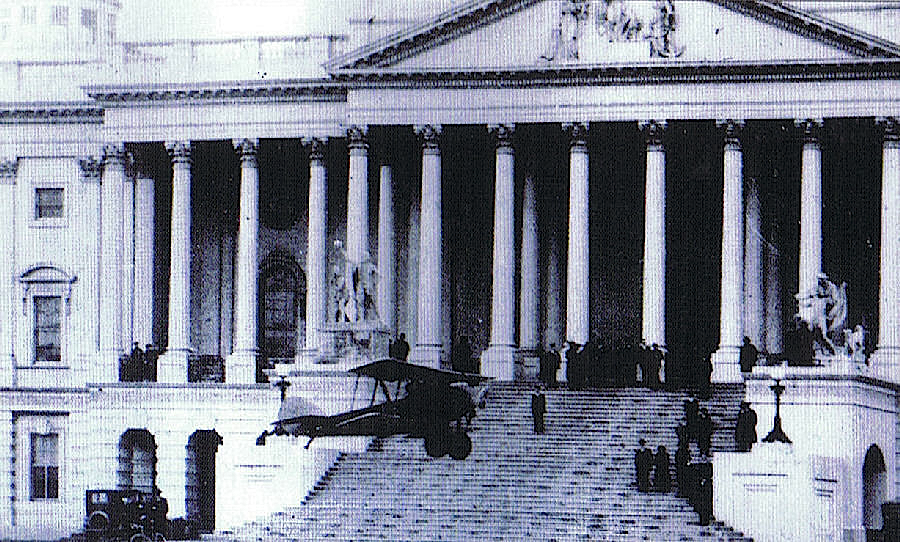
Sperry landing at the U.S. Capitol.

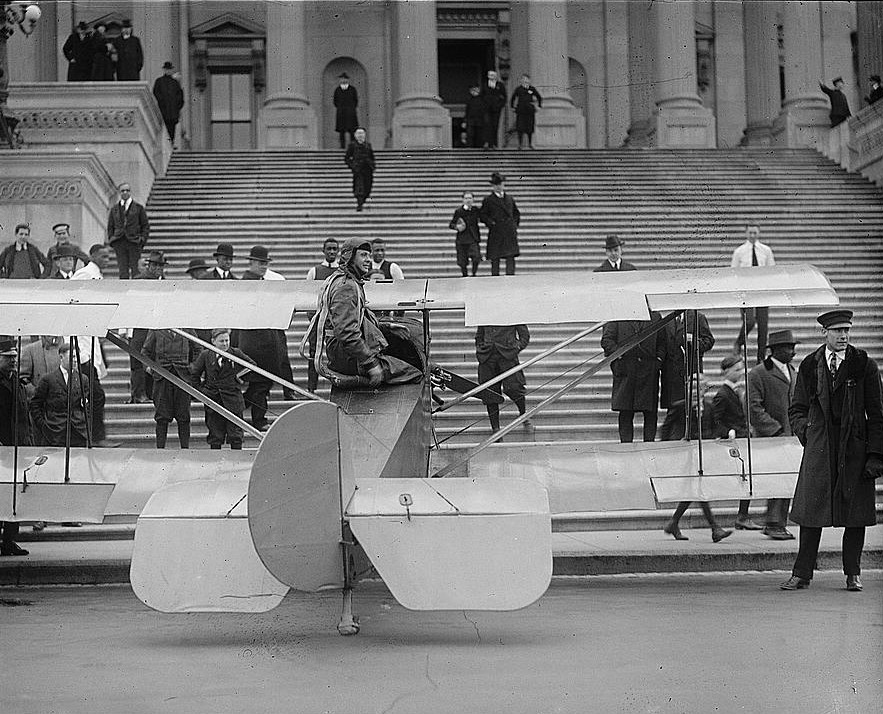
After landing in front of the steps.

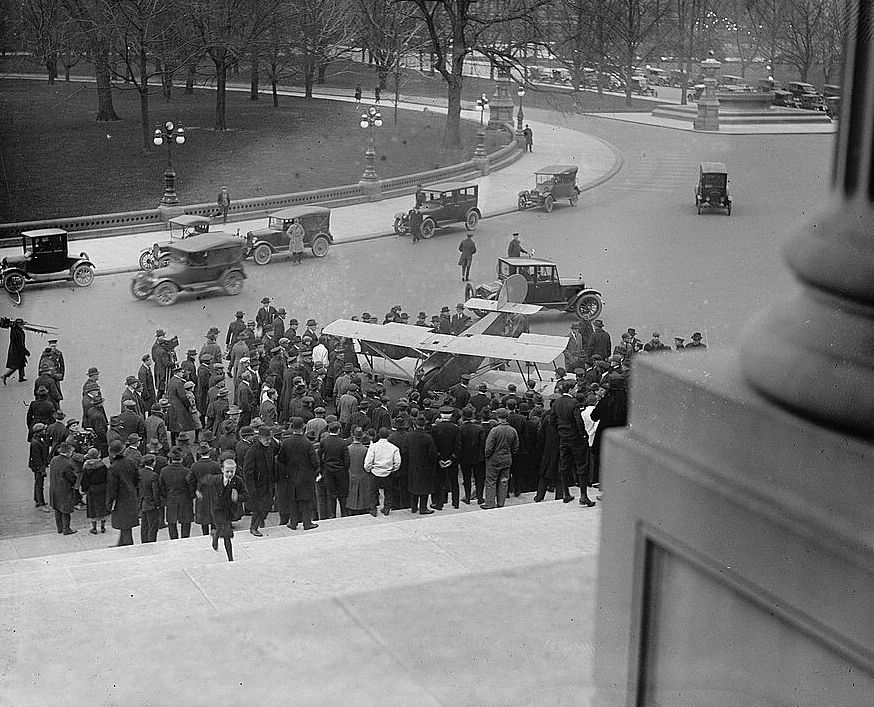
Crowd gathering after landing.

== Operational history ==
The Messenger's small size, simple construction, and inexpensive cost made it ideal for testing and experimentation. As well as the original communications duties, the National Advisory Committee for Aeronautics used one in its pioneering aerodynamic research programs from 1923 to 1929. Sperry modified twelve into the radio-controlled Messenger Aerial Torpedo, an early flying bomb, and developed the apparatus for a Messenger to make the first successful airship hook on and release in December 1924. On December 15, at Scott Field, Illinois, Lt. Clyde Finter hooked on to a trapeze attached to a non-rigid airship, the TC-3. In the Messenger, Finter remained attached briefly while the airship made a turn, then he unhooked and landed the aircraft on the ground.

== Variants ==
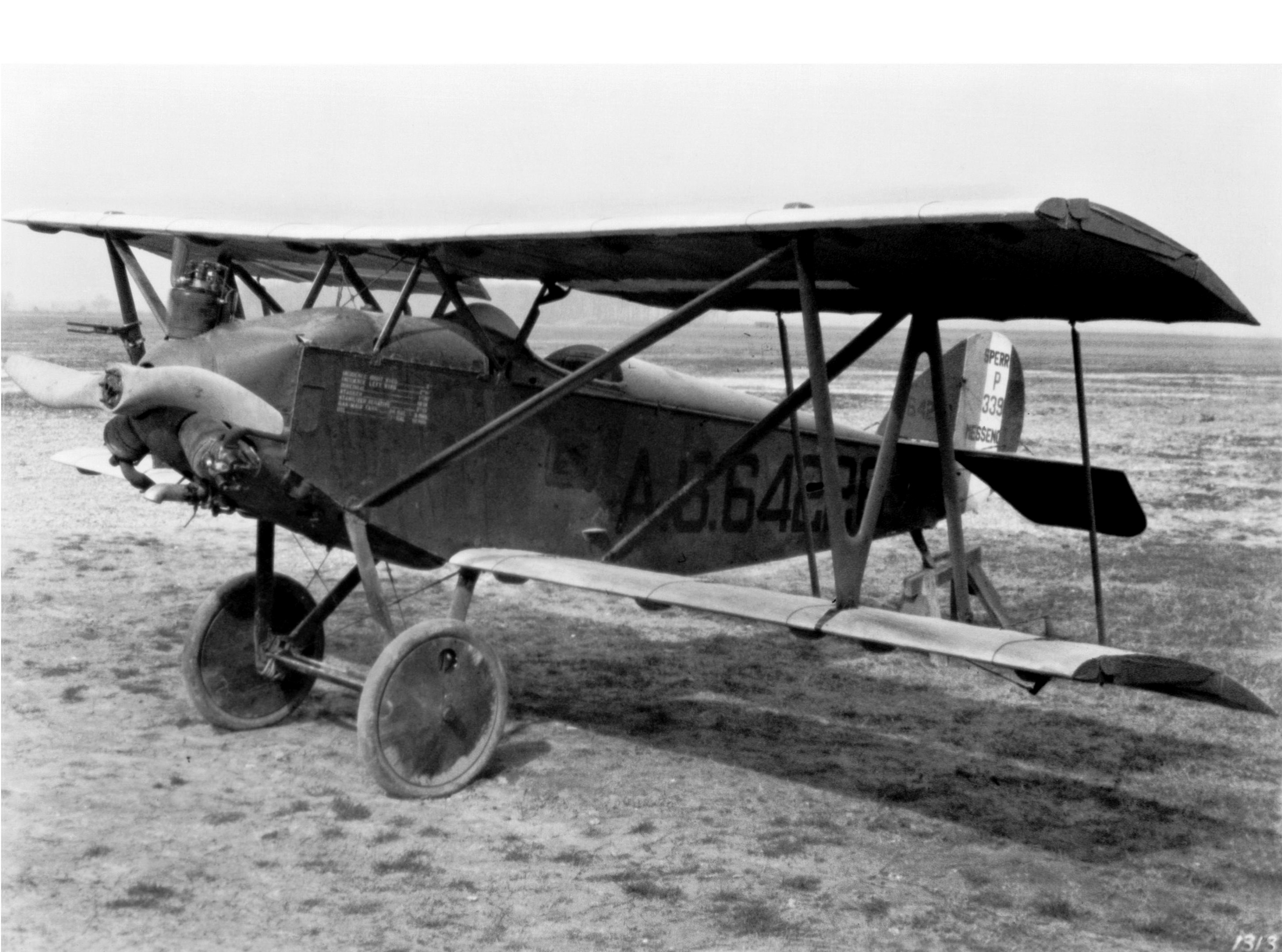
A Sperry M-1 at NACA Langley, in 1926.

Messenger
Sperry designation, 42 built later given USAAS designations M-1, M-1A and MAT.
M-1
Messengers used in communications duties, 26 built and known by the USAAS as the Verville-Sperry M-1
M-1A
Messengers with increased fuel capacity, 16 built.
MAT
Messengers used as aerial torpedoes (Messenger Aerial Torpedo), eight conversions.

== Operators ==
United States

- United States Army Air Service

== Specifications (M-1) ==
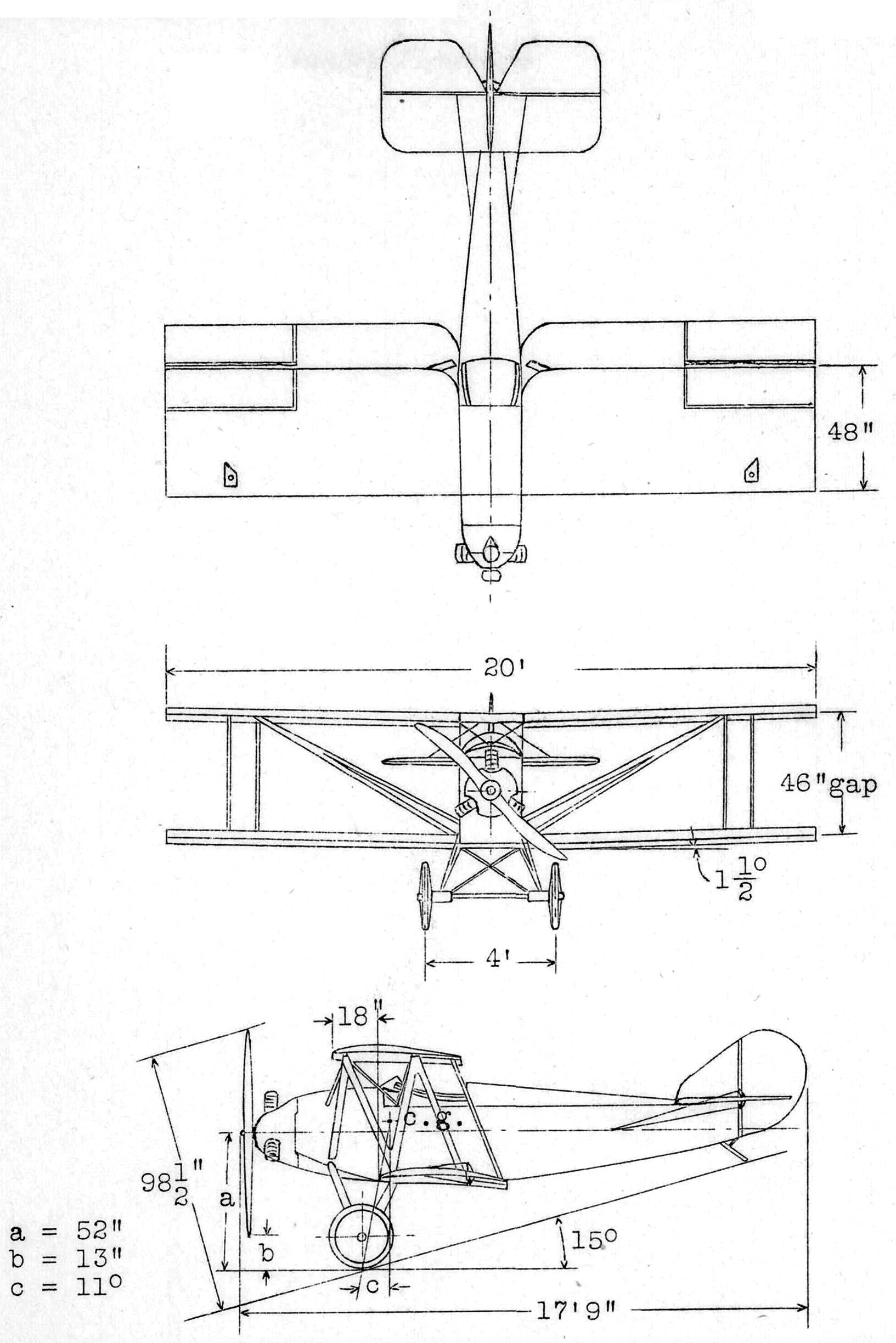
Sperry Messenger 3-view drawing from NACA-TN-271

General characteristics

- Crew: 1
- Length: 17 ft 9 in (5.41 m)
- Wingspan: 20 ft 0 in (6.10 m)
- Height: 6 ft 9 in (2.06 m)
- Wing area: 160 sq ft (14.86 m^{2})
- Empty weight: 623 lb (283 kg)
- Gross weight: 862 lb (391 kg)
- Powerplant: × Lawrance L-4 , 60 hp (45 kW)

Performance

- Maximum speed: 97 mph (156 km/h, 84 kn)
- Rate of climb: 700 ft/min (3.56 m/s)

Armament

- none

== Gallery ==
M-1 Messenger
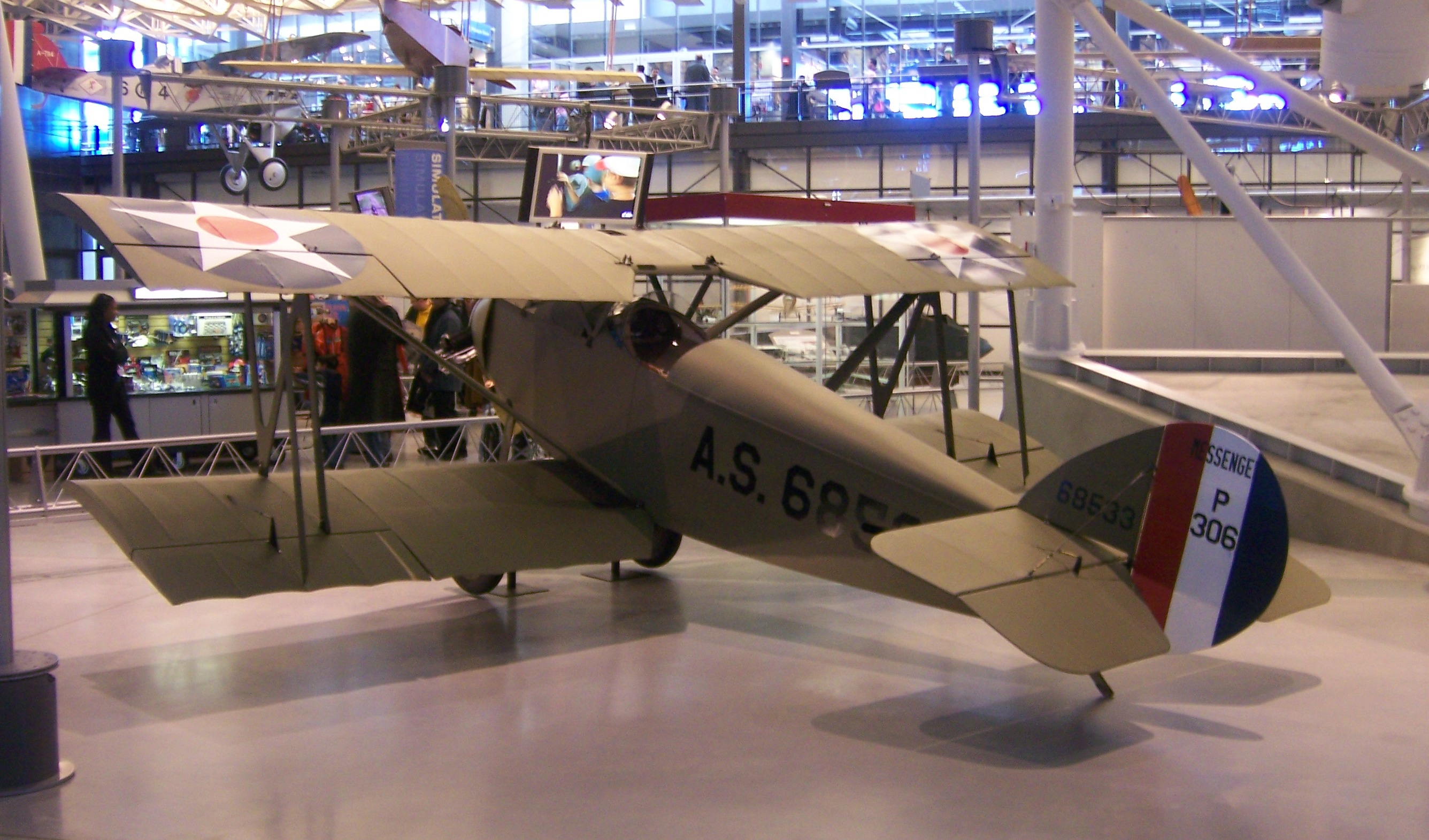
Photo of M-1 in the Steven F. Udvar-Hazy Center

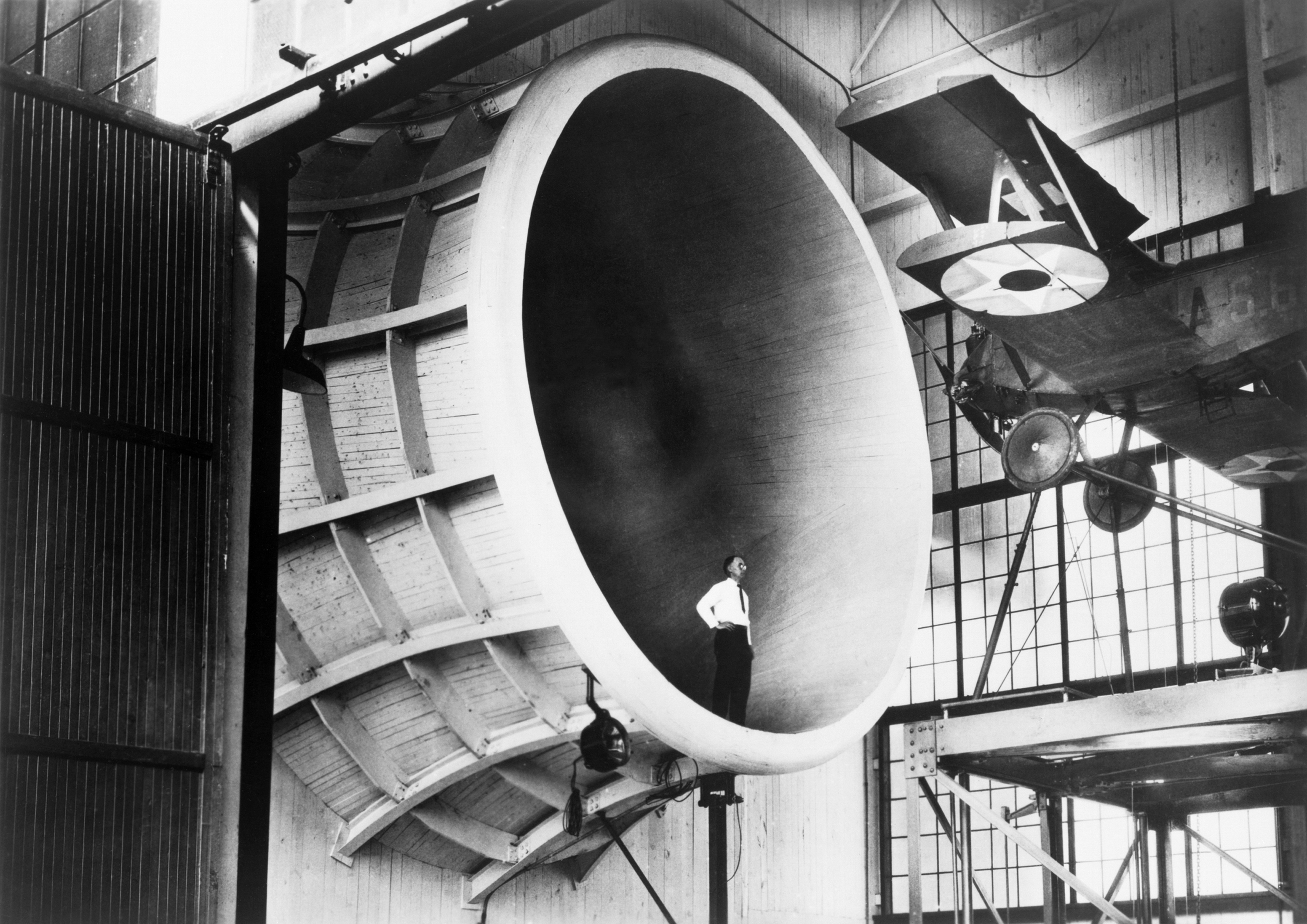
Photo of a M-1 being tested in a Langley Research Center's wind tunnel in mid-1927.

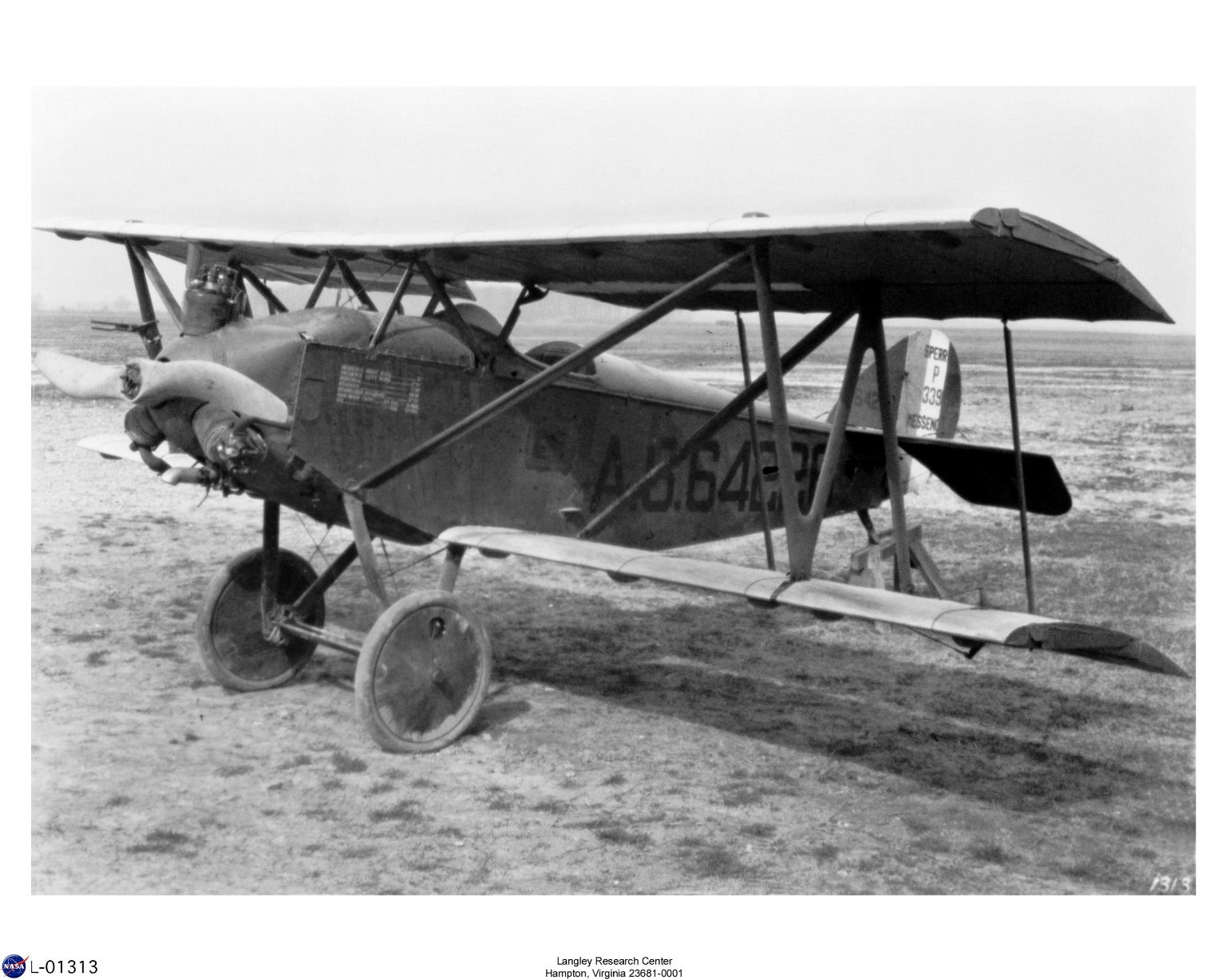
Another photo from LRC

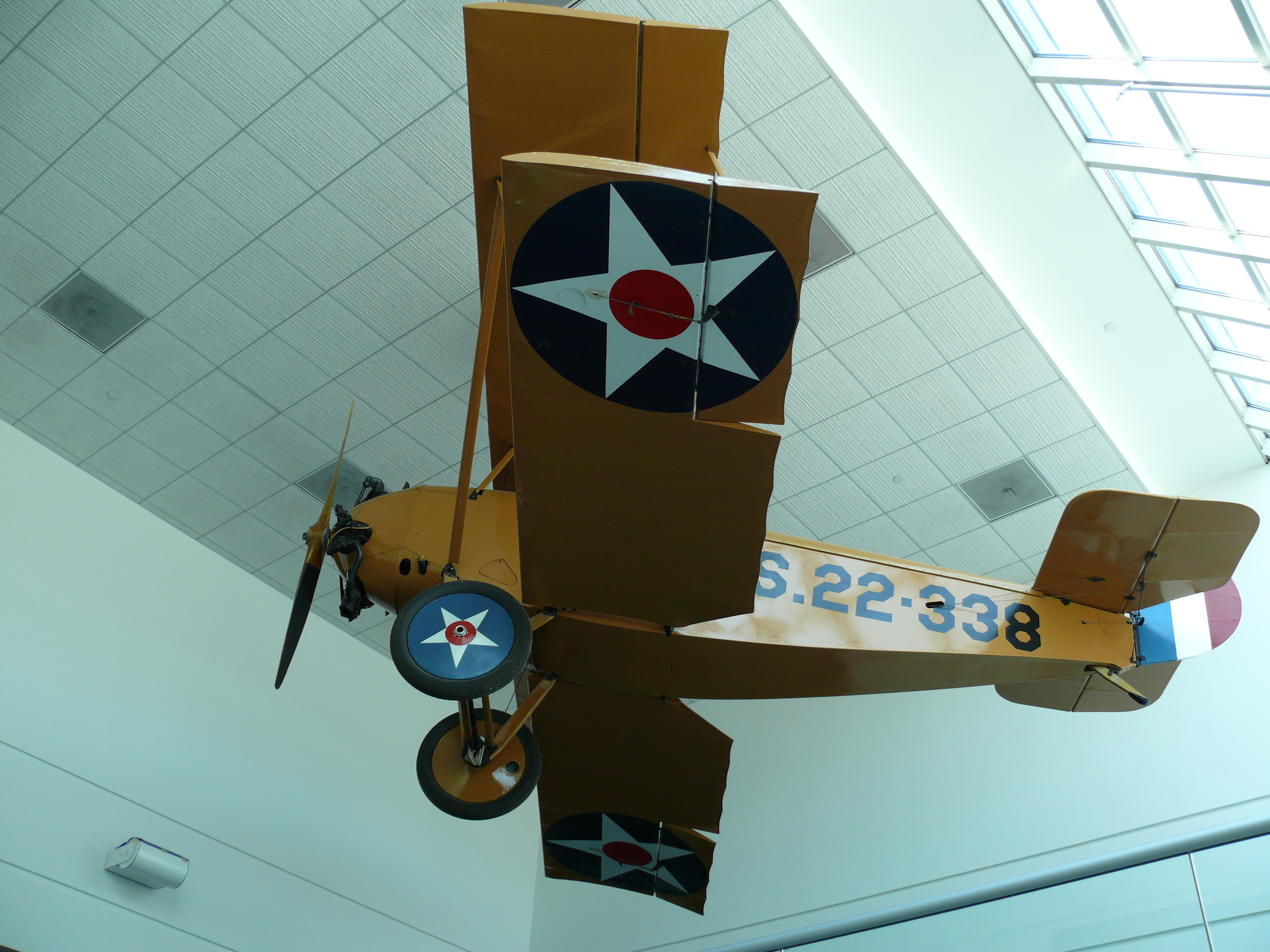
Replica of M-1 in the Cradle of Aviation Museum

== See also ==
Related lists

- List of military aircraft of the United States
