= Verville Aircraft Company =

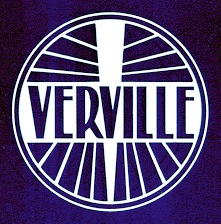
- Company type: Private
- Founded: Detroit, U.S. (1928)
- Founder: Walter Briggs, Sr. Alfred V. Verville
- Defunct: December 1931
- Fate: Bankruptcy
- Headquarters: Detroit, Michigan, United States
- Key people: Barney Everett (Everitt) (President); Louis G. Meister; Edgar A. Goff, Jr.; Charles S. Knight (Test Pilot)

The Verville Aircraft Company was a Detroit, Michigan based manufacturer of small airplanes and flying boats, which became bankrupt during the Great Depression. Alfred V. Verville started the corporation after working for multiple aviation companies. An innovative corporation, it could not survive the difficult financial crisis of the early 1930s. The Verville Aircraft Company was located at 4815 Cabot Street, Detroit, Michigan, occupying the former Rickenbacker plant. Verville Aircraft was organized by Walter Briggs, Sr., president and chairman of Briggs Manufacturing Company. Barney Everett (Everitt) served as the president of the company. The treasurer was S. E. Poole.

== History ==
=== First Airplane ===
The first dedicated passenger plane that Verville Aircraft produced was the Verville Air Coach.

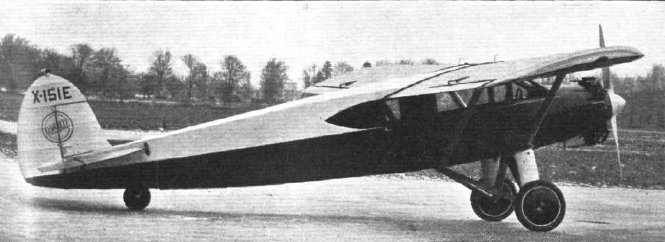
Verville Air Coach

After being acquired by Briggs, the manufacturer produced a light plane followed by the construction of two others.

The following designers worked for Verville Aircraft:

- Louis G. Meister
- Edgar A. Goff, Jr.
- Peter Altman
- Myron E. Zeller
- Charles S. Knight (test pilot)

=== Insolvency ===
A judge in the chancery court in Wilmington, Delaware appointed a receiver for the firm in December 1931.

== Aircraft ==
- Verville Air Coach
- Verville Sport Trainer AT
