= Edward A. Goff Jr. =

American pilot

Colonel Edgar Allen Goff Jr.
- Born: December 12, 1896; Battle Creek, Michigan
- Died: February 11, 1989 (aged 92); Edgewater, Maryland
- Other name: Pete Goff
- Parent: Edgar Allen Goff Sr.

Edgar Allen "Pete" Goff Jr. (December 12, 1896 – February 11, 1989) was a United States Air Force colonel and jet fighter pilot. He was a member of the Early Birds of Aviation. In service, he spent 13 years on active duty and 36 additional years as a reserve officer.

== Biography ==
He was born on December 12, 1896, to Edgar Allen Goff Sr. in Battle Creek, Michigan.

He built and flew his first glider in January 1912 when he was in high school in Battle Creek, Michigan. He made his first recorded flight in June 1915.

He joined the Aeronautical Division, U.S. Signal Corps in January 1917, and after receiving his ground and primary flight training, he took advanced training at Kelly Field and was commissioned a second lieutenant in the Officers Reserve Corps in May 1919.

For several years Pete operated a sales, service, school and taxi business in Battle Creek as the Battle Creek Air Service.

He was employed by Stinson and Verville Aircraft Company. He also flew for a few months as air mail pilot.

From 1937 to 1942 he was employed by the Bureau of Air Commerce in Pittsburgh, Pennsylvania, leaving his position as Senior Aeronautical Inspector to return to active duty in the Air Force. He had a total of over 11,000 hours of civilian flying and 6,000 hours of recorded military flight.

He retired from active military service on January 31, 1957. On January 14, 1957, Pete's fellow officers and many of his Early Bird friends honored him at a cocktail hour and dinner at the officers club at Wright-Patterson AFB where Pete was stationed. Guest speaker was Brigadier General Leslie Mulzer, and his flying career from pushers to jets was recalled in fond tribute to a man who has contributed greatly to the development of aviation.

He then joined Link Aviation of Binghamton, New York.

He died on February 11, 1989, in Edgewater, Maryland, of respiratory failure.

== Legacy ==
He was inducted into the Michigan Aviation Hall of Fame on October 7, 2000.
