= Verville-Sperry R-3 =

American racing aircraft

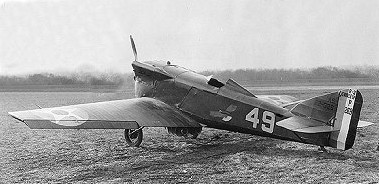

General information
- Type: Racing aircraft
- National origin: United States
- Manufacturer: Lawrence Sperry Aircraft Company
- Designer: Alfred V. Verville
- Number built: 3

History
- Manufactured: McCook Field Engineering Division
- First flight: 1922

The Verville-Sperry R-3 was a cantilever wing racing monoplane with a streamlined fuselage and the second aircraft with fully retractable landing gear, the first being the Dayton-Wright RB-1. In 1961, the R-3 racer was identified as one of the "Twelve Most Significant Aircraft of all Time" by Popular Mechanics magazine. In 1924, an R-3 won the Pulitzer Trophy in Dayton, OH.

== Design and development ==
The R-3 was designed by Alfred Verville. Its first production was in 1922. The R-3 was developed by the McCook Field Engineering Division and manufactured by the Lawrence Sperry Aircraft Company of Farmingdale, New York. Three aircraft were purchased. The airplanes used cylindrical, finned Lamblin radiators and a 300 hp (224 kW) Wright H-3 engine. The R-3s bore Air Service serial numbers 22-326 to 22-328.

== Operational history ==
At the 1922 Pulitzer Trophy race, all three R-3's started in the race, but only two finished. Lieutenant Eugene Barksdale finished fifth at around 181 mph (291 km/h). Lieutenant Fonda B. Johnson finished seventh, his engine freezing after landing. And Lieutenant St. Clair Streett broke an oil line and had a forced landing, damaging his airplane.

For the 1923 Pulitzer, a Curtiss D-12 engine was installed in the plane which eliminated some vibration problems that the H-3 engine had. With the new engine the top speed now was approaching 233 mph (375 km/h). That year a Curtiss biplane was the winner. With Orville Wright officially observing from the ground, Lieutenant Alexander Pearson, Jr. flying an R-3 set a 500 km World Speed Record of 167.74 mph (269.95 km/h) over a 10-lap course on March 31, 1923 at Wilbur Wright Field.

For the 1924 Pulitzer, the R-3, piloted by Lieutenant Harry H. Mills, won the race at a slow 215 mph (346 km/h). The ranked entry–a Curtiss biplane–crashed along the course.

After this race, the R-3 racers were sent to the McCook Field Museum.

== Operators ==
United States

- United States Army Air Corps

== See also ==
- History of the United States Army Air Service
