= Verville-Packard R-1 =

American racing aircraft

R-1
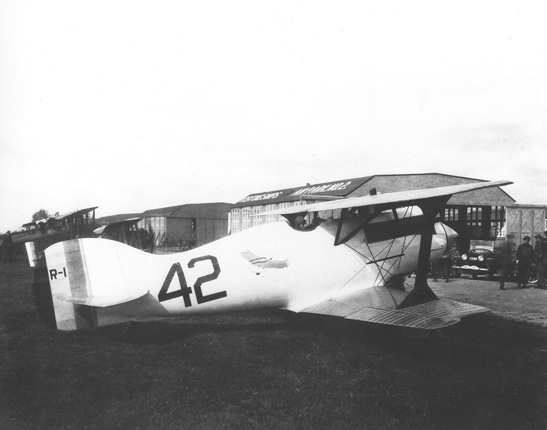

General information
- Type: Racing aircraft
- National origin: United States
- Manufacturer: Verville-Packard
- Designer: Alfred V. Verville
- Primary user: United States Army Air Service
- Number built: 1

History
- First flight: 1919
- Developed from: Verville VCP

The Verville-Packard R-1 was a military racing aircraft that was modified from Alfred V. Verville's previous Verville VCP-1 design. The R-1 is sometimes known also as the Verville-Packard VCP-R or the Verville-Packard 600. The R-1 was the first racing aircraft built for the United States Army Air Service.

== Development ==
The first R-1 was created from a VCP-1 in 1919, by installing the Packard V-12 engine.

== Operational history ==
On November 27, 1920, Capt. Corliss Moseley, flying an R-1 racer, out of 24 track finishers, won the Pulitzer Trophy Race at Mitchel Air Force Base. The top speed was 156.54 mph.

It also raced in the 1920 Gordon Bennet Trophy air race.

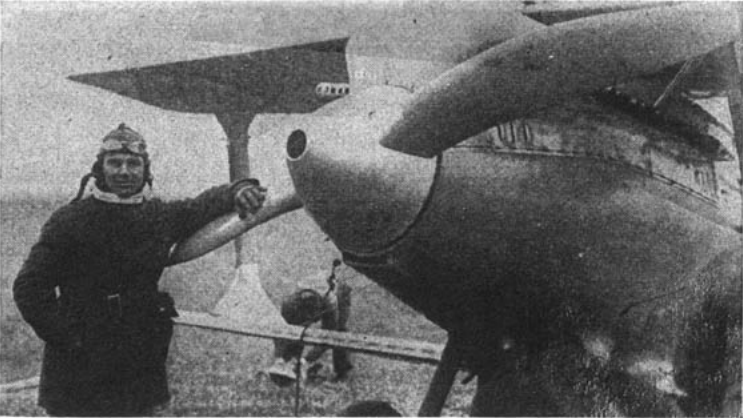
Photo of C. C. Mosley, who piloted the R-1 Racer to victory at the 1920 National Air Races in New York.

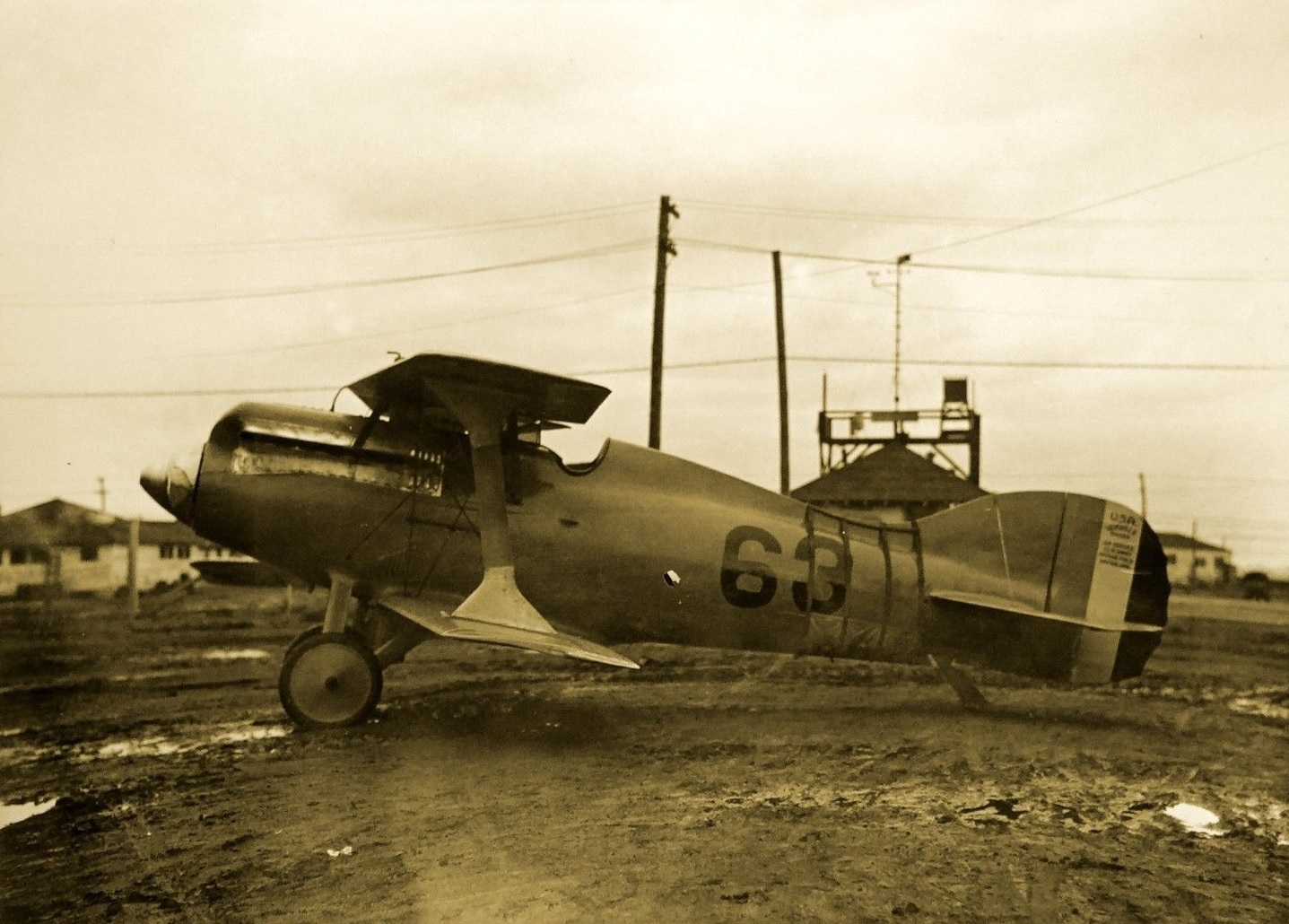
R-1 Racer in photo c. 1920

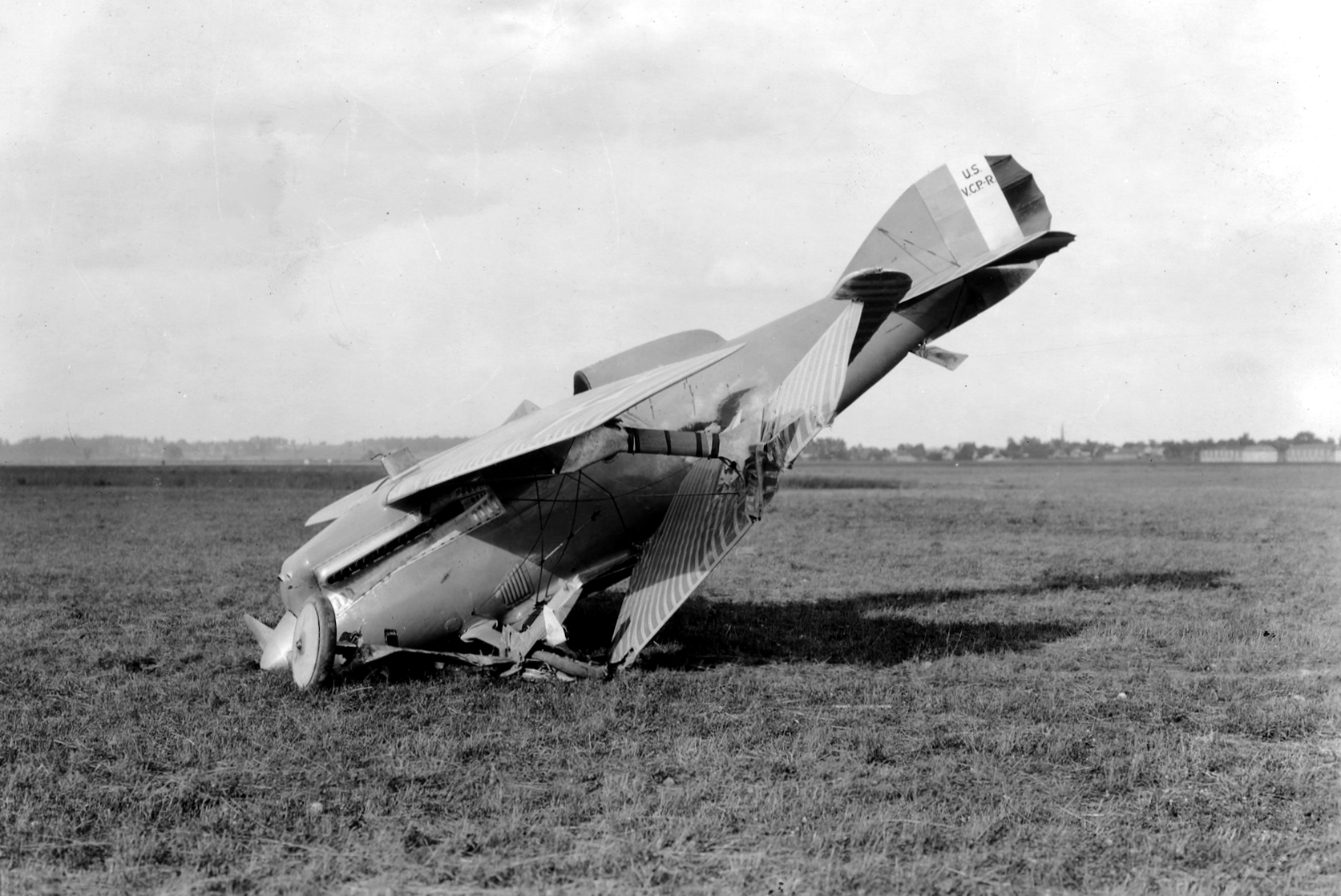
The VCP-R was damaged on August 2nd, 1920, after colliding on landing with an automobile that had been timing its speed tests at Wright Field.

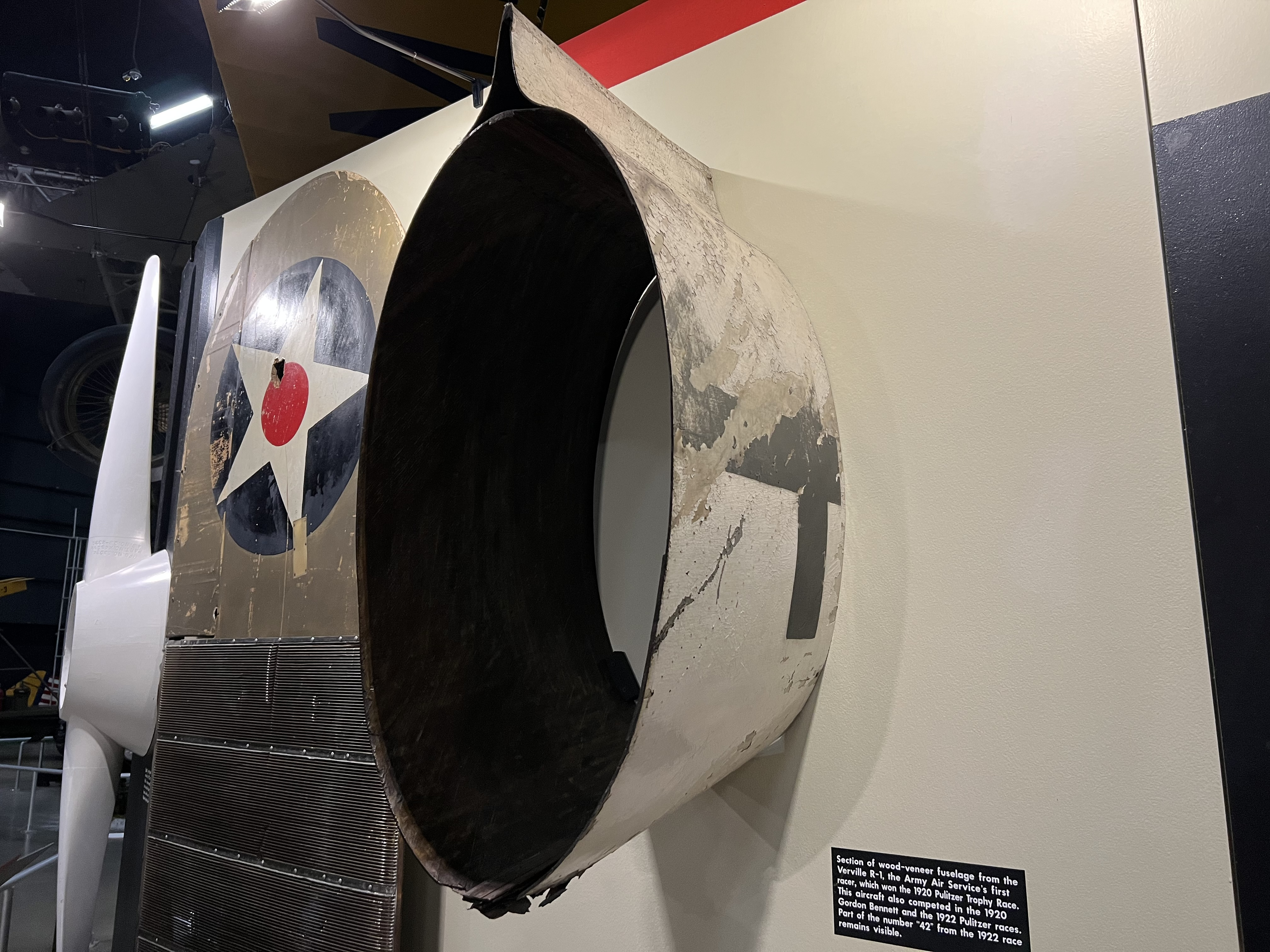
R-1 fuselage section on display at the National Museum of the United States Air Force.

== Operators ==
United States

- United States Army Air Service

== Specifications (R-1) ==
General characteristics

- Crew: 1
- Wingspan: 32 ft (9.8 m)
- Wing area: 269 sq ft (25.0 m^{2})
- Powerplant: 1 × Packard 1A-2025 V-12 liquid-cooled piston engine, 638 hp (476 kW)

Performance

- Maximum speed: 177 mph (285 km/h, 154 kn)

== See also ==
Aircraft of comparable role, configuration, and era

- Dayton-Wright RB-1
- Curtiss CR
