= Howard G. Bunker =

United States Air Force general (1905–1994)

- As a West Point cadet
- Born: 26 April 1905; South Bend, Indiana, United States
- Died: 25 February 1994 (aged 88); San Antonio, Texas, United States
- Burial place: Fort Sam Houston National Cemetery
- Military career
- Allegiance: United States
- Branch: United States Army; United States Air Force
- Service years: 1928–1947 (Army); 1947–1958 (Air Force)
- Rank: Major General
- Nickname: Bunk
- Service number: O-17200
- Commands: Special Weapons Command; 428th Army Air Forces Base Unit
- Conflicts: World War II
- Awards: Legion of Merit; Bronze Star Medal; Croix de Guerre 1939–1945 (France); Member of the Order of the British Empire (UK)

Howard Graham Bunker (26 April 1905 – 24 February 1994) was a major general in the United States Air Force. During World War II he served with the United States Strategic Air Forces in Europe. After the war he was involved with nuclear weapons, commanding the 428th Army Air Forces Base Unit and later the Special Weapons Command at Kirtland Air Force Base, after which he served as the Assistant Deputy Chief of Staff of Operations for Atomic Energy, and was one of the two Air Force members of the Military Liaison Committee of the United States Atomic Energy Commission from 1951 to 1954. Later in his career he served in the office of the Inspector General of the Air Force.

== Early life ==
Howard Graham Bunker was born in South Bend, Indiana, in on 26 April 1905, the son of Samuel Graham Bunker and his wife Maude née Ireland. He attended the University of Wisconsin-Madison for a year in 1923 to 1924 before entering the United States Military Academy at West Point, New York, on 1 July 1924, with an appointment from Congressman Andrew J. Hickey of Indiana's 13th congressional district. He was a member of the college football team in all four years he was there, and was on the boxing team in his final year. He reached the cadet rank of Lieutenant. He acquired the nickname "Bunk".

== Between the wars ==
Bunker graduated on 6 June 1928, ranked 128th in his class, and was commissioned as a Second Lieutenant Coast Artillery Corps. He was detailed to the Air Corps for flight training on 8 September 1928. He underwent primary flight training at Brooks Field, Texas, from 9 September to 28 June 1929, and then advanced training at Kelly Field, Texas, from 1 July to 12 October 1929. Upon the successful completion of his training, he was transferred to the Air Corps on 21 November 1929. During the graduation ceremony, he and his classmate LaVerne G. Saunders conducted a fly past in a Martin NBS-1 bomber.

Bunker's first station was Rockwell Field, California, with the 11th Bombardment Squadron, but he obtained permission to flight test the various aircraft at the Rockwell Air Depot. He was a student at the Air Corps Technical School at Chanute Field, Illinois, from 1 October 1932 to 1 April 1933. He was then assigned to the Fairfield Aviation General Supply Depot at Patterson Field, Ohio, and then nearby Wright Field, Ohio, on 1 August 1936, where he attended the Air Corps Engineering School.

== World War II ==
From 13 September to 5 December 1939, Bunker was a student at the Air Corps Tactical School. He then returned to Wright Field for duty with the Experimental Engineer Section, and was the Chief of the Flight Research Engineer Section there from 1 December 1940 to 1 February 1943. As such, he was involved in the development of stability and anti-spin devices. He was the project officer for the Douglas XB-19 bomber, and the Air Corps liaison officer to Hughes Aircraft for the construction of the Spruce Goose.

Bunker served in the European Theater of Operations during World War II as the Chief of the Air Technical Section in the headquarters of the European Theater of Operations, United States Army (ETOUSA) from 10 February 1943 to 21 February 1944, and was the Director of Technical Services in the headquarters of the Air Service Command of the United States Strategic Air Forces in Europe from 27 February 1944 to 7 February 1945. His duties included being an advisor on aviation to the United States Ambassador to the United Kingdom, John G. Winant, and liaison between ETOUSA and the Eighth Air Force. He was involved in the administration of Lend-Lease aircraft to the UK, and worked with the British Air Ministry. He was also involved in technical intelligence operations, and he retrieved a V-1 Flying Bomb for study from a mushroom cave in the Oise region of France.

On returning to the United States, Bunker became the Chief of the Aircraft Projects Branch in the Materiel Division of the office of the Assistant Chief of Staff for Maintenance and Supply (A-4) at United States Army Air Forces headquarters in Washington, D.C., on 16 March 1945. On 12 May, he became the Deputy Chief of the Materiel Division.

== Post-war ==
In 1947, General Carl Spaatz sent Bunker to Kirtland Field, New Mexico, as commander of 428th Army Air Forces Base Unit, with the task of learning about nuclear weapons. He was the chairman of the Air Force Tactical and Technical Liaison Committee of the Special Weapons Group in the office of the Deputy Chief of Staff of the Air Force for Materiel in Washington, D.C., from 10 September 1947 to 20 December 1948, and the chief of its field office for Atomic Energy from 21 December 1948 to 30 December 1949. He then returned to Kirtland Air Force Base as commanding general of the Special Weapons Command from 1 December 1949 to 11 October 1950, after which he served as the Assistant Deputy Chief of Staff of Operations for Atomic Energy, vice Roscoe C. Wilson. As such, he was one of the two Air Force members of the Military Liaison Committee of the United States Atomic Energy Commission from 3 October 1951 to 29 October 1954.

On 15 November 1954, Bunker became the director of readiness and materiel inspection in the Office of the Inspector General of the Air Force, based at Norton Air Force Base in California. His final station, on 1 March 1955, was as the deputy inspector general there. He became the deputy inspector general for inspection on 9 May. He retired in July 1958.

== Death ==
Bunker died in San Antonio, Texas, where he lived with his wife Hazel, on 24 February 1994, and was buried in Fort Sam Houston National Cemetery.

Awards Bunker received include the Legion of Merit, the Bronze Star Medal, and the French Croix de Guerre 1939–1945 with palm. He was also an honorary member of the Order of the British Empire.

== Dates of rank ==
Insignia	Rank	Component	Date	Reference
	Second Lieutenant	Coast Artillery Corps	9 June 1928	
	Second Lieutenant	Air Corps	21 November 1929	
	First Lieutenant	Air Corps	4 July 1934	
	Captain	Air Corps	9 June 1938	
	Major	Army of the United States	31 January 1941	
	Lieutenant Colonel	Army of the United States	5 January 1942	
	Colonel	Army of the United States	1 March 1942	
	Major	Army of the United States	9 June 1945	
	Colonel	Air Force of the United States	2 April 1948	
	Brigadier general	Air Force of the United States	17 December 1948	
	Major general	Air Force of the United States	8 March 1952	
