= Pomilio BVL-12 =

BVL-12

General information
- Type: Experimental biplane bomber
- Manufacturer: Engineering Division/Pomilio Brothers
- Designer: Ottorino Pomilio
- Primary user: United States Army Air Corps
- Number built: 6

History
- First flight: 1919

The Pomilio BVL-12 was an American experimental single-engine biplane bomber built by the United States Army Engineering Division to the design of Ottorino Pomilio for the United States Army Air Corps after World War I.

Powered by a 400 hp (298 kW) Liberty V12, it would seat two. It featured an equal-span wing, the lower of the pair attached to the fuselage by struts, unique in the United States, rather than directly, which was more usual. Performance proved disappointing, and only six trial models were built.

== Operators ==
United States

- United States Army Air Corps

== Specifications ==
General characteristics

- Crew: 2
- Wingspan: 45 ft 3 in (13.79 m)
- Powerplant: 1 × Liberty L-12 water-cooled 12-cylinder vee engine , 400 hp (298 kW)

Performance

- Maximum speed: 111 mph (179 km/h, 96 kn)

== See also ==
Related lists

- List of military aircraft of the United States
