= St. Clair Streett =

United States Air Force general

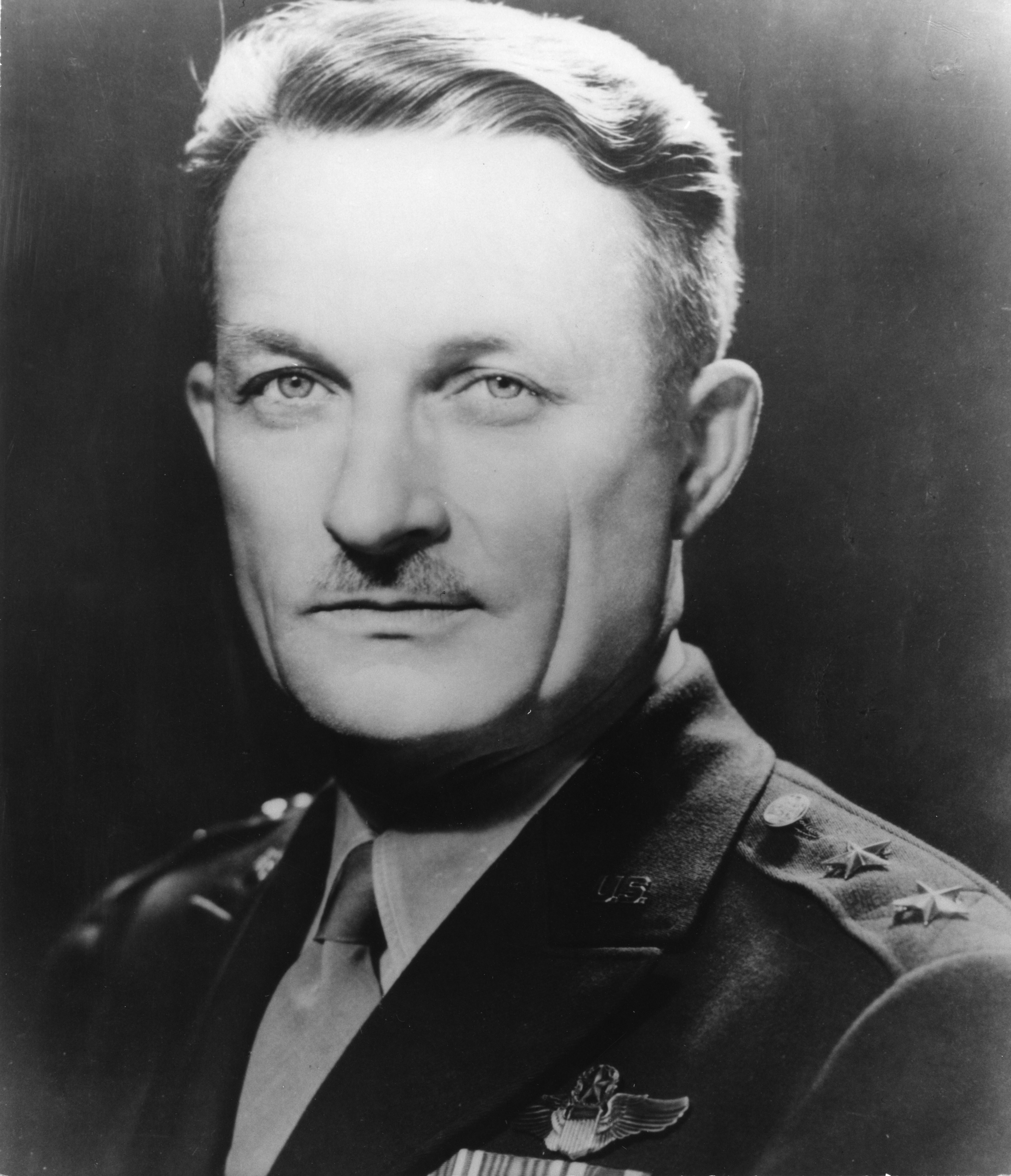
- Streett in the 1940s
- Nickname: Bill
- Born: October 6, 1893; Washington, D.C., U.S.
- Died: September 28, 1970 (aged 76) Andrews Air Force Base, U.S.
- Buried: Arlington National Cemetery
- Allegiance: United States
- Branch: U.S. Army Reserve; Aviation Section, U.S. Signal Corps; United States Army Air Service; United States Army Air Corps; United States Army Air Forces; United States Air Force
- Service years: 1910–1952
- Rank: Major General
- Commands: 11th Bombardment Group; Third Air Force; Second Air Force; Thirteenth Air Force; Continental Air Forces; Strategic Air Command
- Conflicts: World War I World War II
- Awards: Distinguished Flying Cross; Mackay Trophy; Distinguished Service Medal (3); Legion of Merit (2); Purple Heart; Air Medal

St. Clair Streett (October 6, 1893 – September 28, 1970), known as "Bill", was a United States Air Force (USAF) major general and writer who first organized and led the Strategic Air Command (SAC). Streett served as aide to air power advocate General Billy Mitchell, and was viewed by General of the Air Force Henry H. Arnold as his own personal "troubleshooter".

Earlier in his career, Streett served in France during the last stages of World War I. In 1920, he was awarded the Mackay Trophy and the Distinguished Flying Cross for leading a squadron of U.S. airmen on a pioneering air voyage from New York City to Nome, Alaska and back. Streett wrote of his squadron's difficulties in an article for National Geographic. Streett assisted Mitchell during the famous bombing demonstration against battleships. After participating in several air races, he made an exploratory flight to extreme altitude during which he experienced frozen flight controls, and then wrote a story about the adventure for Popular Science.

During World War II, Streett commanded various training units in Hawaii, Florida and Colorado, solving logistical, training, and personnel problems. In Washington, D.C., he led the Theater Group of the Operations Division in the Office of the Chief of Staff where he expressed grave misgivings about the role of General Douglas MacArthur in the Pacific War—some two years later Streett was sent to the South West Pacific Area to work under MacArthur commanding the Thirteenth Air Force during its first offensive drive.

With victory certain, Streett returned to the United States to organize for Arnold the Continental Air Forces (CAF), and then to expand its operation across the country. Streett retained command when the CAF turned into the SAC, and continued to experience friction with MacArthur. After retiring from the United States Air Force in 1952, Streett was named to the Sarnoff Commission, a presidential formation tasked with trimming unnecessary military spending.

== Early career ==
St. Clair Streett was born on October 6, 1893, in Washington, D.C., the first child of Shadrach Watkins Streett and his wife, the former Lydia Ann Coggins. Streett was named for his grandfather, Dr. St. Clair Streett of Maryland. St. Clair is a family name originating from the mid-18th century when a Martha St. Clair married a John Streett in Maryland.

St. Clair Streett joined the United States Army after high school. By 1916, he was a sergeant in the Signal Corps, Enlisted Reserve., This is after the start of the World War I in Europe 1914-1918 and before America's entry into the war. In December 1916, Streett signed up as an aviation cadet and was trained at the Curtis School at Newport News, Virginia and at Wright Field in Ohio. America entered the world war in April 1917. On September 27, 1917, St. Clair Streett was commissioned a second lieutenant in the Signal Officers' Reserve Corps.

In December 1917, Streett was posted to Issoudun, France, as an air training instructor. The majority of the United States Army troops and pilots would arrive later, in 1918. He was then assigned to the 5th Pursuit Group operating out of Lay-Saint-Remy Aerodrome, France. Later, after the Allied victory in November 1918, he served in Germany with the American occupation forces, and returned to the United States in August 1919. On July 1, 1920, Streett was commissioned a first lieutenant in the Regular Army Officers' Reserve Corps, Air Service.

== Pioneering flights ==
=== The Alaska Flying Expedition ===
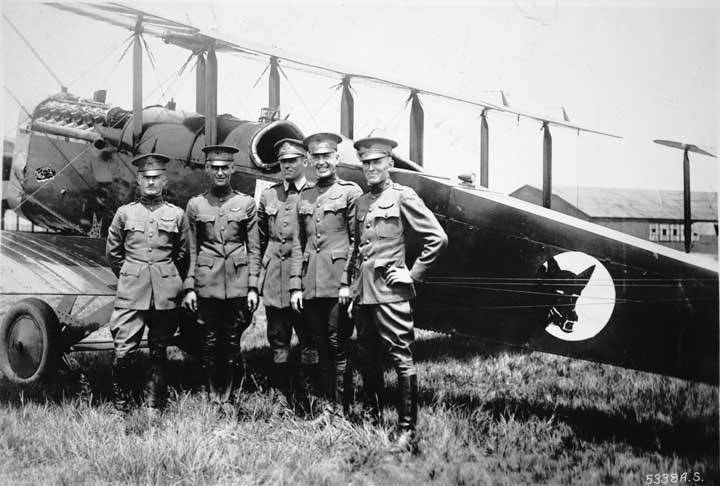
Capt. St. Clair Streett (at left) with pilots of the 1920 Alaskan Expedition

In early 1920, Streett made a five-week, 4,000-mile (6,400 km) survey flight to assess field conditions in eleven states. Then, at the suggestion of General Billy Mitchell who wished to strengthen the American air presence in Alaska Territory, Streett commanded The Alaska Flying Expedition, an exploratory flight made by the Air Service between 15 July and 20 Oct. 1920, from Mitchel Field on Long Island to Nome, Alaska. Dubbed the Black Wolf Squadron for the logo painted on the fuselage sides of their four De Havilland DH-4B biplanes, the eight men flew 9,349 miles (15,000 km) round trip in 112 hours of flying time, dividing the route into 18 legs across the northern United States and the western provinces of Canada, then north to Fairbanks, Alaska via Dawson City, Yukon. The flight reached Nome on 23 Aug. 1920 and returned to Mitchel Field on 20 Oct. 1920. An advance party prepared landing fields, stocked fuel and provisions to replenish the flyers and their aircraft.

Afterward, Streett speculated, "Some day this trip may be made overnight—who knows?" For this pioneering effort demonstrating that Alaska could be linked by air to the United States, Streett was awarded the Distinguished Flying Cross and the Mackay Trophy, the later given to the "most meritorious flight of the year" made by a U.S. military airman.

=== General Billy Mitchell ===
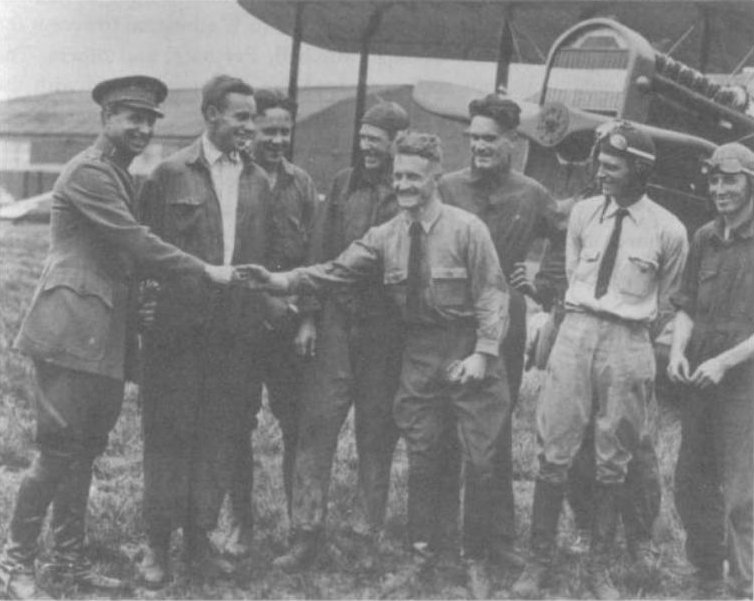
Brigadier General Billy Mitchell (left) shakes hands with St. Clair Streett, hatless, wearing a shirt and tie, 1920

Following this successful publicity flight, Streett was appointed assistant to General Billy Mitchell, the deputy chief of the Air Service. When Mitchell formed the 1st Provisional Air Brigade in May 1921 for the purpose of demonstrating that a bomber could sink a battleship, Streett was closely connected. Mitchell sent Streett to Air Corps headquarters to inform his superior Charles T. Menoher that the battleships could not be sunk as planned, with the bombers flying at 10,000 feet (3,000 m). Streett informed Menoher that Mitchell intended to break the rules and fly much lower to ensure a newsworthy sinking, but that the Navy should not know of this change. During the June and July bombing demonstrations, Streett flew in the back seat as navigator in Osprey, Mitchell's personal DH-4B heavy bomber as they bombed from heights of about 2,000 to 3,000 feet (600 to 900 m). Mitchell also planned to sink the target ship with several very close near-miss explosions that would cause severe damage to the ship's hull below the waterline. The US Navy's rules for the bombing limited the actual number of direct hits allowed on the target ship. The US Navy had intended to inspect the damage to these ships after the bombings, and US Navy gunfire to learn as much as possible about the effects of shell & bomb hits on battleship armor and structure. The target ship, the former German World War I battleship Ostfriesland was sunk with only a few direct hits, and several intentional very near-misses. The US Navy leadership was shocked and angry over the target's sinking. In late July after the battleship Ostfriesland had been sunk, Mitchell carried out a 19-bomber mock raid against Manhattan. About the stunt, Streett wrote an article entitled "14th Heavy Bombardment Squadron Attacks New York City" for the Army and Navy aviation magazine U.S. Air Service.

During this time, Streett wrote an article about the Alaskan venture entitled "The First Alaskan Air Expedition" for the National Geographic magazine, with the issue appearing in May 1922. In July, he became commanding officer of the headquarters detachment at Bolling Field.

=== Air races ===
Flying an Army Orenco D on November 27, 1920, Streett finished in fourth place in the first Pulitzer Trophy Air Race, held at Mitchel Field on Long Island. On October 14, 1922, Streett participated in the third Pulitzer race flown out of Selfridge Field near Detroit but an oil line burst in his Verville-Sperry R-3 and forced him to abandon the race on the fifth and final lap.

In January 1924, Streett was named assistant chief of the Airways Section in the Office of the Chief of Air Corps. In this role he helped gather prevailing weather data, airfield locations, maps and reports of flying conditions for the Air Corps men undertaking the first aerial circumnavigation during March–September 1924. He planned for and ordered caches of oil and fuel to be kept at likely locations during the multistage voyage. Streett's preparations were praised as "very complete and of greatest assistance" in carrying out the feat. In September 1925, he entered the Air Corps Tactical School at Langley Field, Virginia, graduating the following June.

=== Altitude ===
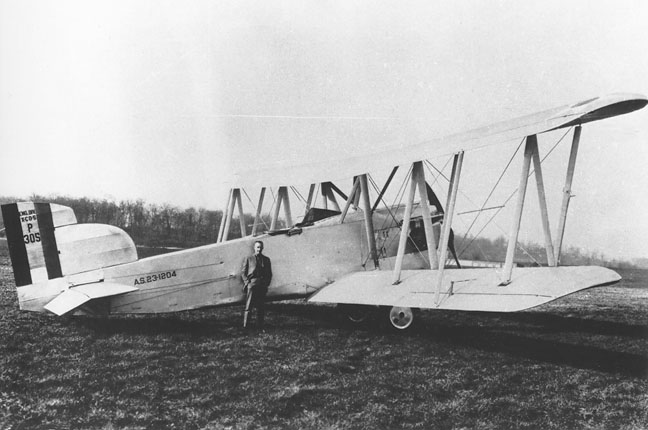
The XCO-5, an experimental observation biplane

Streett was transferred to Selfridge Field, Michigan, in August 1926, and appointed commanding officer of the First Pursuit Group Headquarters. He was assigned to Wright Field, Ohio in March 1928 as test pilot and chief of the Flying Branch. Flying the XCO-5 on October 10, 1928, Streett and Albert William Stevens achieved an unofficial altitude record for aircraft carrying more than one person: 37,854 feet (11,538 m); less than 1,000 feet (300 m) short of the official single-person altitude record. At that height they measured a temperature of −78 °F (−61 °C), cold enough to freeze the aircraft controls. With frozen controls, Streett was unable to reduce altitude or to turn off the engine until some twenty minutes later when it ran out of fuel, after which he piloted the fragile experimental biplane down in a gentle glide and made a deadstick landing. An article about the feat appeared in Popular Science in May 1929, entitled "Stranded—Seven Miles Up!" During July 1932, he was on special assignment as assistant in the preparation of data on performance tests of aircraft.

Streett spent the following three years at service schools. He entered the Command and General Staff School at Fort Leavenworth, Kansas, In August 1932. After graduation In June 1934, he began a course at the Chemical Warfare School at Edgewood Arsenal, Maryland, which he completed in August. He was then transferred to the Army War College, from which he graduated in June 1935.

Streett's next assignment was with the War Department General Staff where he served as a member of the Miscellaneous and Operations Section of the War Plans Division. He became a student at the Naval War College at Newport, Rhode Island, in June 1939, and in July 1940 reported to Hickam Field, Hawaii, for duty as commanding officer of the 11th Bombardment Group, where the group operated B-18 Bolo medium bombers. On December 1, the 11th was redesignated a heavy bombardment group, and Streett prepared them to receive B-17 Flying Fortress heavies, the first ones arriving in April 1941 with Lieutenant Colonel Albert Francis Hegenberger to command them. Streett shifted to become plans and training officer for the Hawaiian Department at Fort Shafter, and then was attached to the Army Air Forces division of the War Department as deputy chief of operations.

== World War II ==
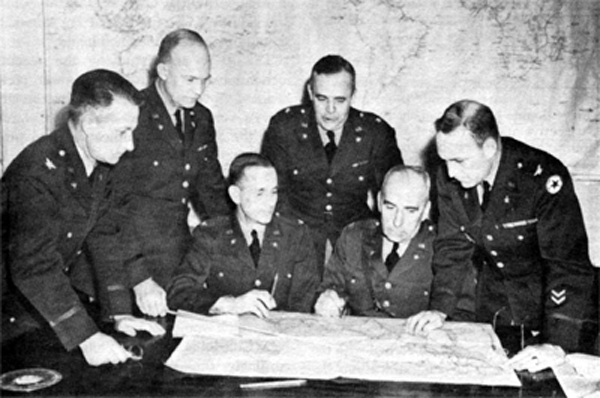
Col. St. Clair Streett (at left) with Gen. Eisenhower in War Plans Division meeting, March 1942

In March 1942, Streett became chief of the Theater Group of the Operations Division in the Office of the Chief of Staff. When United States Army Air Forces (USAAF) Chief of Staff Henry H. "Hap" Arnold proposed to George Marshall in October 1942 that an Army man be named supreme commander for the whole Allied effort in the Pacific, suggesting Douglas MacArthur, Lesley McNair or airman Joseph T. McNarney for the position, Marshall without comment passed the request to his staff for analysis. There, Albert Wedemeyer and Streett examined the problem. Wedemeyer, an Army officer, thought the supreme commander should be an airman; either Arnold or McNarney. Streett, too, was in favor of one supreme commander but he recognized the political challenges—he projected that the president would have to make the appointment, not a committee of military men prone to interservice rivalry. For supreme commander in the Pacific, Streett suggested McNarney or Admiral Chester W. Nimitz, depending on whether an air or a naval strategy was considered most important. About MacArthur, Streett wrote that "[a]t the risk of being considered naive and just plain country-boy dumb," he thought that MacArthur would have to be removed from the Pacific in order for there to be any sound cooperation in the theater. Streett suggested MacArthur be appointed ambassador to "Russia" or some similar position of high stature but low military influence. Of this analysis work, nothing was enacted; Marshall did not bring the problem and its suggested solutions to either the Navy or the president.

=== Tampa ===
In November 1942, Arnold assigned Streett to take charge of the Third Air Force, a medium bomber training command based at Tampa, Florida. The unit had seen enough Martin B-26 Marauder training accidents that grim-humored airmen coined the phrase "one a day in Tampa Bay." (The oft-repeated line was an exaggeration; ignoring crashes into land, 13 Marauders ditched in Tampa Bay in the 14 months between the first one on August 5, 1942, and the final one on October 8, 1943.) Streett implemented a tightening of training policy to reduce losses through human error, and he initiated research into solutions for the technical problems the bomber was having.

At the time, Tampa was rated the worst U.S. city for syphilis infections among USAAF personnel, and the city with the most rampant prostitution. USAAF Captain Robert Dyer, charged with protecting the country's airmen from venereal disease (VD), had no success getting Tampa authorities to address the problem. When Streett arrived at his command and saw the extent of the VD crisis at MacDill Field, he threatened to close certain areas of Tampa to all military personnel if the city's police were unable to curb prostitution. This action would have ruined a number of legitimate local businesses, and a campaign was initiated to arrest prostitutes and to bar unmarried couples from renting a room together. Police arrests, however, were limited to misdemeanor charges of vagrancy or loitering—there were no state or local laws specific to prostitution. In response to complaints from Streett and other military leaders, in January 1943 Florida's Department of Health mounted a statewide media blitz encouraging testing and treatment for VD. Later that year, the state passed a law giving police wide latitude to arrest prostitutes for hire and also unmarried persons participating in "licentious sexual intercourse without hire."

=== Heavy bombers ===
In September 1943, Streett assumed command of the Second Air Force at Peterson Field, Colorado Springs, Colorado, training heavy bomber crews to fly the B-24 Liberator.

In January 1944, he was assigned to the Southwest Pacific Area and assumed command of the Thirteenth Air Force when it was consolidated into an offensive stance in June. Streett served under George Kenney, who was the USAAF theater commander subordinate to MacArthur. At the end of September and in early October, Streett mounted a series of 2,500-mile (4,000 km) round trip air raids by heavy bombers flying from Hollandia, New Guinea to attack Balikpapan, a major center of Japanese petroleum processing and storage. In U.S. media reports, the raids were compared to the Ploesti raids of 1943, with strong Japanese resistance on the second raid said to be responsible for downing seven B-24s—a loss of 70 aircrew. Streett guided the Thirteenth through their part of the initial phases of the Philippines Campaign, in concert with the Fifth Air Force as part of United States Far East Air Forces.

== Postwar career ==
When Arnold needed to solve a thorny problem, he was known to demand "Where is Bill Streett?" In January 1945 as victory in the war appeared certain, Arnold was faced with postwar reorganization of the Army Air Forces. Arnold ordered Streett to return stateside to form for him the Continental Air Forces (CAF) at Bolling Field. Streett served under Arnold as deputy commander of the CAF, but Arnold held at that time two major commands: Air Staff and CAF, with Air Staff taking his full attention. In effect, Streett was left in charge of CAF. In November 1945, Streett proposed a reorganization of United States air power into separate commands: Eastern and Western air defense commands, a tactical air support command and a training command. His proposal placed strategic bombers in a task force under the commander of the Army Air Forces. When the Continental Air Forces became Strategic Air Command (SAC) in March 1946, he retained his nominal position as deputy commander, and actually commanded the new organization until October when Kenney's prior obligations to the United Nations came to an end and he could finally take the reins of the SAC as originally intended by General Carl Andrew Spaatz.

On October 22, 1946, Streett delivered a lecture entitled The Strategic Air Command to the Air War College at Maxwell Air Force Base in Alabama. He revealed to the students that the SAC was not yet very powerful—only two strike groups were fully operational and that three months in the future after a rush of preparation, there still would be only four B-29 Superfortress groups and two long-range fighter aircraft groups. This was in contrast to the then-current public relations statements by the SAC which proclaimed "quick retaliation will be our answer [to any future aggressor] in the form of an aerial knockout..." Streett described how General MacArthur, Commander-in-Chief, U.S. Far East Command, refused to release to SAC the control of one very heavy bombardment group and one very long-range reconnaissance group of the Twentieth Air Force. Streett offered his opinion that the SAC should stage into the Far East and take operational control of those units.

In January 1947, Streett was assigned to the adjutant general's office as chief of the Military Personnel Procurement Service. He was appointed the air inspector in the newly established Office of the Inspector General in January 1948, and two months later became deputy inspector general. Streett was named deputy commander of Air Materiel Command at Wright-Patterson Air Force Base, Ohio, in October 1949. In December 1951, he became special assistant to the commanding general of Air Materiel Command. Streett retired from the USAF in February 1952 with the rank of Major General, having flown numerous aircraft from early biplanes to the early jets.

In October 1952, Streett was named to the Citizens Advisory Commission on Manpower Utilization in the Armed Services, popularly known as the Sarnoff Commission for its chairman Brigadier General David Sarnoff, the long-serving chairman of RCA. Defense Secretary Robert A. Lovett established the commission for the purpose of identifying and eliminating excess military spending without reducing combat effectiveness. Robert Wood Johnson II, chairman of Johnson & Johnson, resigned from the commission because of the strain it took on his health, but he noted that the USAF represented by Commissioner Streett was "cooperative and open to greater progress" with the commission, directly contrasting with the U.S. Navy which he rated as "militantly resistant." The Sarnoff Commission's 85-page report was delivered to the United States Senate Committee on Armed Services and Charles Erwin Wilson, President Dwight D. Eisenhower's new defense secretary, on February 17, 1953. It called for a ten percent reduction in military spending, amounting to the elimination of 500,000 civilian and military personnel and the cutting of $5B from the military's annual budget. After studying the report, Wilson appointed a commission to heed its main points and streamline the Defense Department so that it could more efficiently wage a war. Instead of Streett, Wilson selected retired General Spaatz to represent the USAF.

== Personal life ==
In 1922, Streett married Mary Lois Williams (1895–1999), a personal friend of "Hap" Arnold and his wife "Bee". The Streetts had one child, a son in 1927, St. Clair Streett Jr., also nicknamed "Bill", who graduated from the United States Military Academy at West Point with the Class of 1949 and took part in the infantry Battle of Old Baldy during the Korean War. General Streett's son, St. Clair Streett Jr. married Edith Peake Boatner (youngest daughter of USAF Lt. Gen. Bryant L. Boatner) in 1954 and had four children: St. Clair "Dan" Streett III, born in California in 1955, who graduated from Virginia Military Institute in 1977, USAF Colonel Bryant Boatner Streett (VMI 1978) born at Fort Belvoir, Virginia in 1956, Monica Page Streett born in 1959 in Nurnberg, Germany, and Emily Williams Streett born in 1961 at West Point, New York. General Streett's son retired from the US Army after 21 years of service in the Infantry and the Engineers. Besides serving in combat in Korea, and in South Vietnam as an advisor, St. Clair Jr. had participated in the US Army Corps of Engineer construction projects for NASA (in the race to put a man on the moon before the end of the decade) at Cape Caniveral, Florida and Huntsville, Alabama. "Bill" Streett Jr. married again in 1980 to Anitra Mae "Sue" Rustmeyer—the two had a daughter, Sarah Mae Streett, born the next year.

Major General Streett died on September 28, 1970, at Andrews Air Force Base in Maryland. His wife (at age 104 years) died on October 17, 1999, and was buried with him at Arlington National Cemetery.
