= Boeing GA-1 =

Experimental ground attack aircraft

GA-1
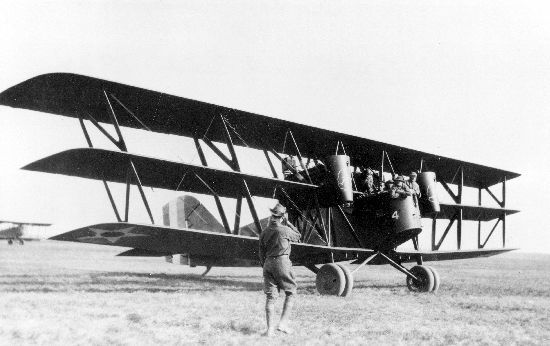
- Engineering Division/Boeing GA-1

General information
- Type: Ground attack
- Manufacturer: Boeing
- Designer: Isaac M. Laddon
- Primary user: USAAS
- Number built: 10

History
- Manufactured: 1920–1921
- Introduction date: 1921
- First flight: May 1920
- Retired: 1926

The Boeing GA-1 (company designation Model 10) was an armored triplane. Designed in 1919, it was powered by a pair of modified Liberty engines driving pusher propellers. The first of the Engineering Division's heavily armored GAX series (ground attack, experimental) aircraft, the ponderous airplane was intended to strafe ground troops while remaining immune to attack from the ground as well as from other enemy aircraft. Its armor resulted in an excessive five-ton weight.

== Development ==
Soon after the end of World War I, the US Army sought to explore highly armored and armed specialist ground-attack aircraft. This was a pet project of General Billy Mitchell. The Army Air Service Engineering Division issued requests for proposals to U.S. aircraft producers on 15 October 1919. There were no designs offered, so the Engineering Division ordered one of its engineers, Isaac M. Laddon, to attempt what the aviation industry clearly considered impossible. His design, designated GAX, first flew at McCook Field on 26 May 1920. The GAX was McCook Field Project P129 and wore AAS serial number 63272.

== Design ==
Aerodynamic cleanliness was sacrificed to fields of fire for its eight machine guns. The sturdy structure was able to carry a heavy load of ammunition along with about 2,200 lb (998 kg) of armor plate. The result was an angular machine of wire-braced wooden construction with plywood and fabric covering. A rectangular-section fuselage carried the forward gunner in an open nose position, the pilot in a semi-enclosed cockpit with armored shutters for forward vision, and the rear gunner in an open dorsal position. The engines were carried in mid-wing nacelles.

As designed, the armament was comprehensive. The pilot was in control of a 37 mm cannon, four fixed Lewis guns fired forward and down, and a machine gun fired forward and upward over the wings. A further two Lewis guns fired to the rear and downwards (through a fuselage tunnel) and a single machine gun up and over the wings. A gunner's position was in the nose. The armor covered the front half of the fuselage and the engine housings.

The top wing was of larger span than the lower ones; the middle and top wings carried ailerons. Span decreased from 65 ft 6 in to 58 ft 6 in between the top and lower wings.

== Operational history ==
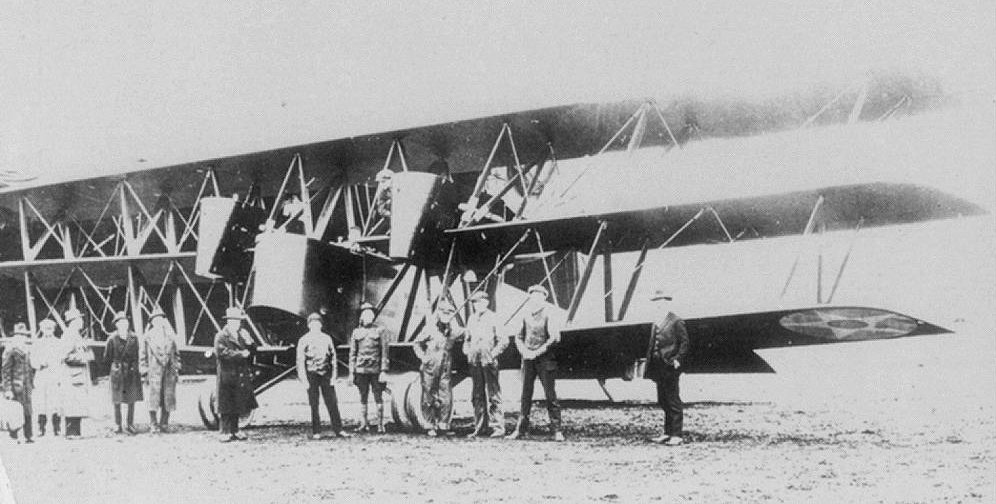
A GA-1 being examined

On 7 June 1920, Boeing was awarded a contract for 20 production models designated GA-1. Before the first was delivered in May 1921, the order had been reduced to ten. The production aircraft wore Boeing constructors' numbers 200-209 and AAC serial numbers 64146-64155. Number 64146 was evaluated at McCook as project P187. The follow-on GA-2 was flown at McCook field in December 1921 with orders to construct two more aircraft.

The GA-1s were sent to Kelly Field, Texas, in early 1923 for service tests with the only US aerial attack formation, the 3rd Attack Group. These tests showed the aircraft to be unacceptable; they had poor visibility and performance, particularly in rate of climb, maneuverability, and range. The aircraft suffered from excessive noise and vibrations caused by the 3/16-inch (4.75mm)-thick armor, and because of their high weight, takeoff runs were very long by the standards of the day. The GA-1s thus proved extremely unpopular with the pilots conducting the evaluation.

As a result, in 1925 the entire country's attack air force (that is, the 3rd Attack Group, contrasted with the bomber force) consisted of fourteen Airco DH-4 machines, inadequate at the time even for training, let alone for combat.

It was rumored that the GA-1s survived until surveyed on 14 January 1926, so that Kelly Field pilots could be threatened with being forced to fly them as punishment for disciplinary infractions. All were scrapped in April 1926.

== Variants ==
GA-1
armored triplane, one pilot and two gunners, two Liberty L-12A Vee pusher engines of 435 hp (324 kW), ten built
GA-2
biplane, one pilot and two gunners, 750 hp (559 kW) Engineering Division W-18 engine, one 37 mm (1.5 in) cannon and 6 0.3 in (7.62mm) machine guns, two built

== Operators ==
United States

- United States Army Air Service

== Specifications (GA-1) ==
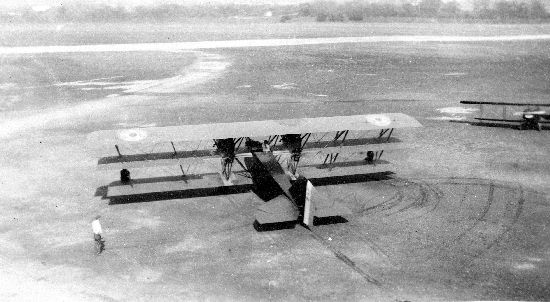
Top view of a GA-1

Data from "The Complete Encyclopedia of World Aircraft"

General characteristics

- Crew: three
- Length: 33 ft 7 in (10.25 m)
- Wingspan: 65 ft 6 in (19.97 m)
- Height: 14 ft 3 in (4.34 m)
- Wing area: 1,016 sq ft (94.39 m^{2})
- Empty weight: 7,834 lb (3,553 kg)
- Gross weight: 10,426 lb (4,729 kg)
- Powerplant: 2 × Liberty L-12A Pusher , 435 hp (324 kW) each

Performance

- Maximum speed: 105 mph (169 km/h, 91 kn)
- Cruise speed: 95 mph (153 km/h, 83 kn)
- Range: 350 mi (563 km, 300 nmi)
- Service ceiling: 11,500 ft (3,505 m)
- Rate of climb: 600 ft/min (3.05 m/s)

Armament

- 1 x 37 mm Baldwin cannon
- 8 x .30 cal. Browning machine guns
- With some machine guns removed, 10 small fragmentation bombs could be carried.

== See also ==
Related lists

- List of triplanes
