= Fabbrica Aeroplani Ing. O. Pomilio =

Italian aircraft manufacturer

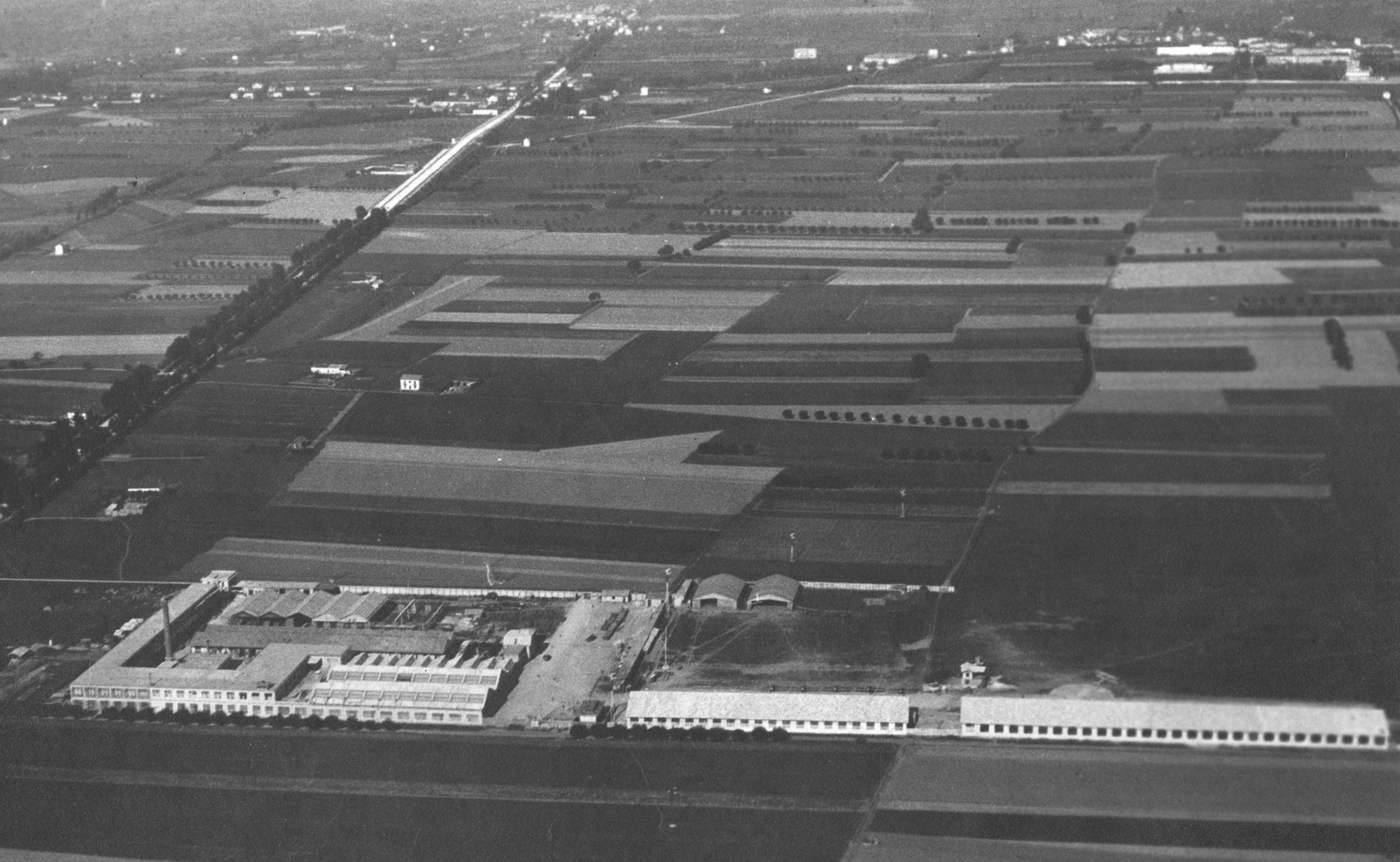
Pomilio Aircraft Factory in 1917

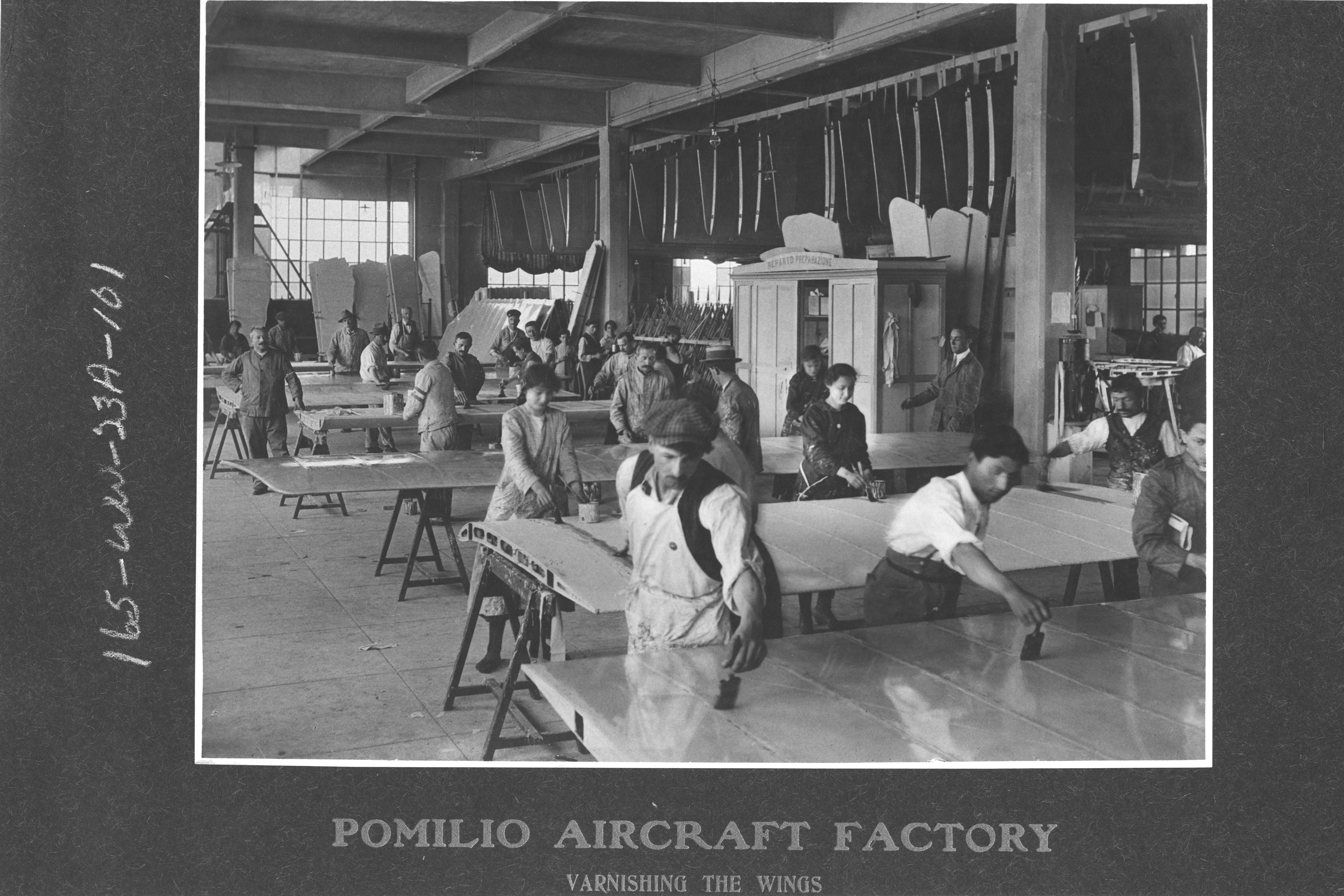
Manufacturing of aircraft wings

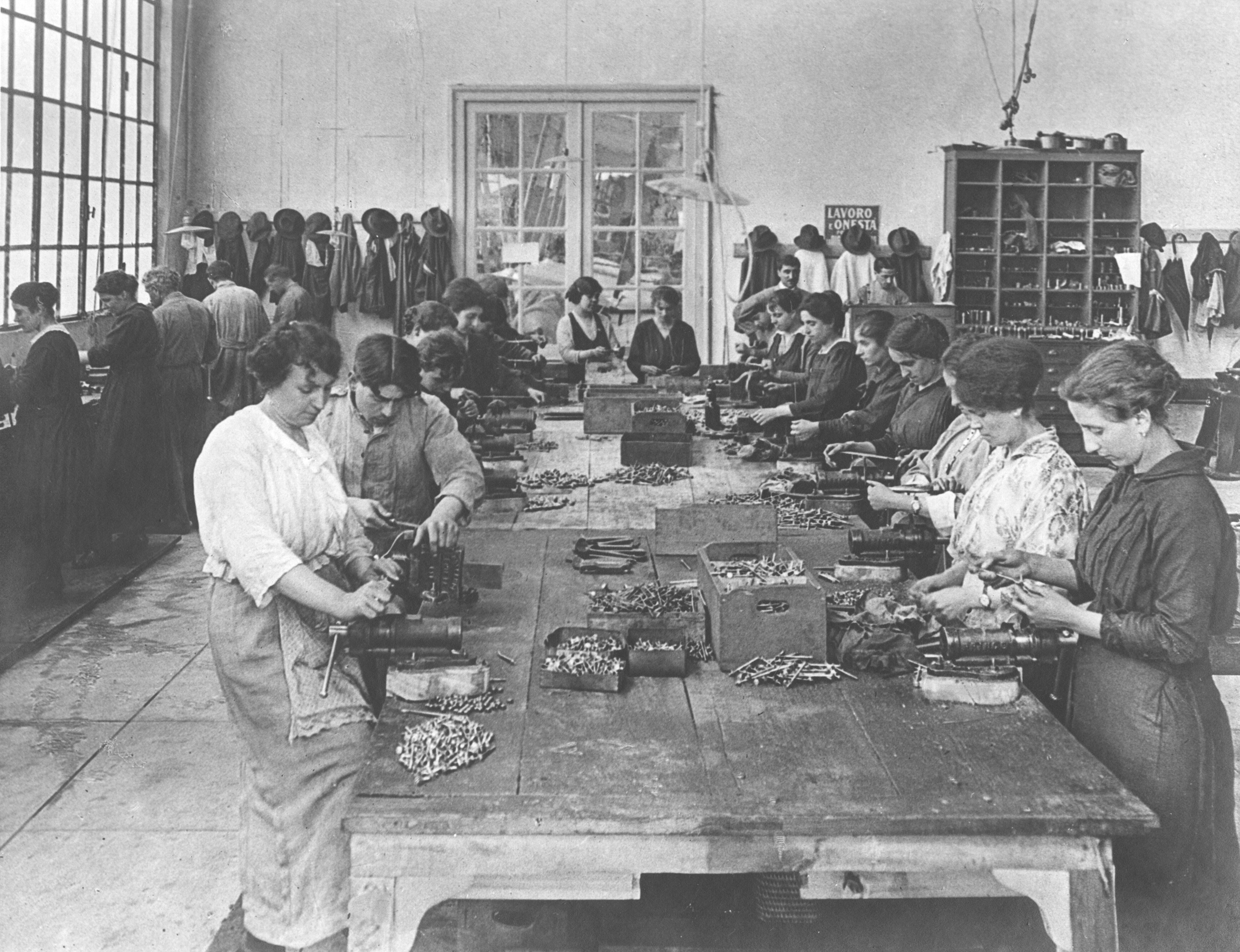
Manufacturing metal parts

Fabbrica Aeroplani Ing. O. Pomilio was an Italian World War I biplane aircraft manufacturer.

The Pomilio series of aircraft (PC, PD, PE and PY) were two-seater scout aircraft. When first introduced in spring 1917, the type was faster than most other machines of its day although instability problems had to be dealt with by subsequent variants. With the completion of the final variant, the Pomilio brothers sold their company to Ansaldo and emigrated to the US.

The Pomilio range of scout planes is known to have served in approximately 30 squadrons of the Italian Air Force.

== Aircraft ==
- Pomilio BVL-12
- Pomilio FVL-8
- Pomilio PD
- Pomilio PE
- Pomilio PY
- Pomilio Gamma
- Savoia-Pomilio SP.1
- Savoia-Pomilio SP.2
- Savoia-Pomilio SP.3
- Savoia-Pomilio SP.4

== See also ==
- List of Italian companies
