= Engineering Division TP-1 =

American fighter aircraft

TP-1 / XCO-5
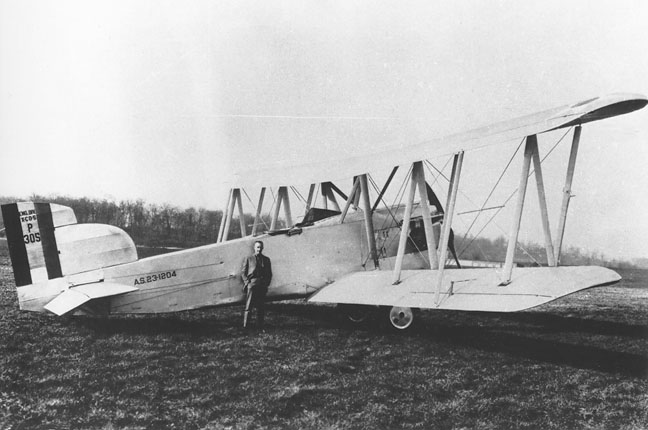
- XCO-5

General information
- Type: Biplane fighter
- National origin: United States
- Manufacturer: Engineering Division
- Designer: Alfred V. Verville and Virginius E. Clark
- Number built: 2

The Engineering Division TP-1 was a two-seat biplane fighter designed by Alfred V. Verville and Virginius E. Clark at the United States Army Air Corps Engineering Division. A second aircraft was completed as an observation biplane and designated the Engineering Division XCO-5.

== Development ==
The prototype TP-1 was built as the XTP-1 and tested at McCook Field in 1923. A biplane, the upper wing had a smaller span and narrower chord than the lower wing. The XTP-1 was armed with five .30 in (7.62 mm) machine guns and fitted with a 423 hp (315 kW) Liberty 12 engine. A second prototype was completed as an observation/reconnaissance aircraft with the designation XCO-5.

The XCO-5 needed a high-lift wing suitable for high-altitude work. New wings were prepared. The aerofoil was Joukowsky StAe-27A, a heavily cambered wingshape with a thick leading edge. The upper and lower wings had a pronounced stagger, with a total wing area of 600 ft^{2}. As well as lining and insulating the cockpit, heat was taken from the engine exhaust. A cover over the top of the cockpit kept the heat in; a clear panel in the cover allowed the pilot to see his instruments.

== Operational history ==
On October 10, 1928, Bill Streett and Albert William Stevens achieved an unofficial altitude record in the XCO-5 for aircraft carrying more than one person: 37,854 ft (11,538 m); less than 1,000 ft (300 m) short of the official single-person altitude record. At that height they measured a temperature of −78 °F (−61 °C), cold enough to freeze the aircraft controls. With frozen controls, Streett was unable to reduce altitude or to turn off the engine until some 20 minutes later when it ran out of fuel, after which he piloted the fragile experimental biplane down in a gentle glide and made a deadstick landing.

== Variants ==
TP-1
Two-seat pursuit fighter prototype, one built.
XCO-5
Observation variant of the TP-1, one built.

== Operators ==
United States

- United States Army Air Corps

== Specifications ==
Data from The American Fighter

General characteristics

- Crew: 2
- Length: 25 ft 1 in (7.65 m)
- Wingspan: 36 ft 0 in (10.97 m)
- Height: 10 ft 0 in (3.05 m)
- Wing area: 375 sq ft (34.8 m^{2})
- Empty weight: 2,748 lb (1,246 kg)
- Gross weight: 4,363 lb (1,979 kg)
- Powerplant: 1 × Liberty L-12 water-cooled V12 engine, 423 hp (315 kW)

Performance

- Maximum speed: 129 mph (208 km/h, 112 kn) at sea level
- Cruise speed: 117 mph (188 km/h, 102 kn)
- Endurance: 3.95 hr
- Service ceiling: 13,450 ft (4,100 m)
- Rate of climb: 495 ft/min (2.51 m/s)

Armament

- Guns:
- 2 × fixed forward firing .30 in (7.62 mm) machine guns
- 2 × flexibly-mounted .30-in machine guns in rear cockpit
- 1 × .30-in machine gun firing through ventral grille

== See also ==
Related lists

- List of military aircraft of the United States

== Bibliography ==
- Andrade, John (1979). U.S.Military Aircraft Designations and Serials since 1909. Midland Counties Publications. ISBN 0-904597-22-9.
- Angelucci, Enzo; Bowers, Peter M. (1987). The American Fighter. Sparkford, UK: Haynes. ISBN 0-85429-635-2.
- "A Fine American Altitude Flight", Flight: 68, 4 February 1926
