= Engineering Division =

United States military organization

- Founded: 31 August 1918
- Parent: United States Department of War

The Engineering Division was a division of the Aviation Section, U.S. Signal Corps in the United States Department of War. It was formed on 31 August 1918, under the direction of Lt Col Jesse G. Vincent, to study and design American versions of foreign aircraft. It was later renamed Engineering Division, Air Service and then in 1926 Material Division Air Corps. It was based at McCook Field, and in October 1927 moved to Wright Field.

== Background ==
United States Armed Forces procurement of aircraft began when the Army's 1907 Aeronautical Division, U.S. Signal Corps, acquired several of the Wright Military Flyer of 1909.

== Airplane Engineering Department ==
The Airplane Engineering Department was established by the Equipment Division, U.S. Signal Corps in 1917 for World War I experimental engineering. The department had a 1917 Foreign Data Section, and the Airplane Engineering Department was on McCook Field at Dayton, Ohio (the 1917 Patterson Field and Fairfield Aviation General Supply Depot were nearby.) In June 1917 Major Raynal Bolling lead a Bureau of Aircraft Production mission to France, investigating if it was possible to build British and French aircraft in the United States and which aircraft should be bought from the Allies. McCook Field established the Air School of Application in 1919 after the department became the Airplane Engineering Division on 31 August 1918 under Lt Col Jesse G. Vincent (Packard co-engineer of the 1917 V-12 Liberty engine) to study and design American versions of foreign aircraft. It combined a number of existing divisions of the Air Service, including the Engineering Department and the Airplane Experimental Department.

== Head ==
On the year 1919 there was Colonel Bane in charge.

== Engineering ==
The Engineering Division was set up to evaluate proposals, and the first project it undertook was installing an American Liberty L-12 engine on the British Airco DH.9 aircraft, designating it USD-9 and USD-9A. Other aircraft modified include the Bristol F.2 Fighter, designated XB-1.

In 1920, the Engineering Division's Bureau of Aircraft Production completed the design of the Ground Attack, Experimental, (GAX) aircraft built as the Boeing GA-1, and designed the Verville-Clark Pursuit (led by Alfred V. Verville) that after redesign won the initial Pulitzer Race in 1920 at Roosevelt Field. The division also designed the TP-1 and TW-1. In 1925, in order to promote private aircraft developments, the Engineering Division was restricted by General Mason Patrick and could no longer build experimental aircraft.

In 1926 the United States Army Air Service was replaced with the United States Army Air Corps, and the Engineering Division merged in 1926 with the Air Service's Supply Division (formed by 1919) to form the Material Division (Air Corps) at Wright Field.

Summary of aircraft built
Model name	First flight	Number built	Type
Engineering Division USD-9	1918		
Engineering Division USB-1		2	design based on re-engined Bristol F.2 Fighter
Engineering Division USB-2			
Engineering Division VCP-1		2 (they were redesignated VCP-1 and R-1)	Pursuit aircraft (US Army fighter)
Engineering Division VCP-2		2 (they were redesignated PW-1 and PW-1A)	Pursuit aircraft (US Army fighter)
Engineering Division XB-1A		3 prototypes (further 44 by Dayton-Wright)	new fuselage on Bristol F.2 Fighter
Engineering Division LUSAC-11		2 prototypes (and 25 by Packard)	designed by member of the French Aeronautical Mission
Engineering Division FVL-8			
Engineering Division PW-1			see VCP-2 above
Engineering Division TP-1			
Engineering Division TW-1		2	trainer design
Engineering Division XCO-5			
Engineering Division XCO-6			
