= Engineering Division XCO-6 =

American observation aircraft

XCO-6
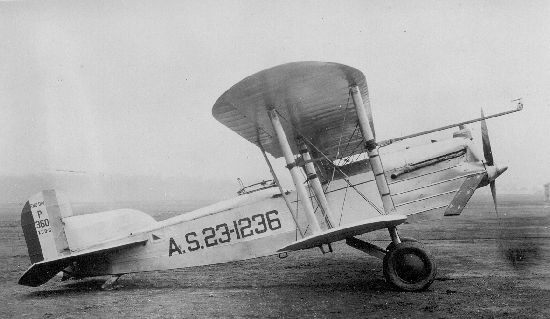

General information
- Type: Observation biplane
- National origin: United States
- Manufacturer: Engineering Division
- Primary user: United States Army Air Service
- Number built: 2

The Engineering Division XCO-6 was an American two-seat observation biplane designed by the United States Army Engineering Division, only two were built and the type did not enter production.

== Design and development ==
Two prototypes of the XCO-6 were built powered by a 420 hp (313 kW) inverted air-cooled V-1410 engine. One was tested at McCook Field and subsequently modified but no others were built.

== Variants ==
XCO-6
Prototype two-seat single-engined observation biplane.
XCO-6A
Proposed variant with the main fuel tanks moved into the upper wing, not built.
XCO-6B
A XCO-6 modified with a change of engine to a 435 hp (324 kW) Liberty 12A engine.
XCO-6C
XCO-6B modified with a larger propeller and changes to the landing gear.

== Specifications (XCO-6) ==
Data from

General characteristics

- Crew: 2
- Length: 29 ft 8 in (9.04 m)
- Wingspan: 48 ft 0 in (14.63 m)
- Powerplant: 1 × Liberty V-1410 V-12 water-cooled piston engine, 420 hp (310 kW)

Performance

== See also ==
Related lists

- List of military aircraft of the United States
