= Frank Stuart Patterson =

American test pilot (1897-1918)

Lt. Frank Patterson (September 3, 1896 – June 19, 1918) was a test pilot for the United States Army Air Corps who was killed in the crash of his DH.4M, AS-32098, at Wilbur Wright Field near Dayton, Ohio on June 19, 1918. He was piloting a flight test of a new mechanism for synchronizing twin machine guns and the propeller when a tie rod broke during a dive from 15,000 feet (4,600 m), causing the wings to separate from the aircraft.

Frank Stuart Patterson was born in Dayton, Ohio, on September 3, 1896. He was the son of Frank Jefferson Patterson and Julia Perrine Shaw Patterson. The elder Patterson and his brother, John H. Patterson, founded The National Cash Register Company (NCR) and figured prominently in local Dayton history. Frank attended Yale University, but graduated "in absentia" in the spring of 1918 because he, like many of his classmates, had joined the Army. He enlisted in May 1917 and was commissioned in September as a first lieutenant in the Officers Reserve Corps with the aeronautical rating of pilot. Lieutenant Patterson was assigned to the 137th Aero Squadron as a test pilot at Wilbur Wright Field the following May. On June 19, 1918, little more than a month after his arrival, Lieutenant Patterson and his aerial observer, Lieutenant LeRoy Amos Swan, went aloft in their DH-4 to test newly installed machine gun synchronizers, allowing the guns to fire between the blades of the propeller as it rotated at high speed. They completed two trials successfully, but during a steep dive on the third test a tie rod securing the wings broke and the airplane's wings collapsed. The aircraft crashed, killing both crewmen.

About five years following Lt. Patterson's death, the Patterson family formed the Dayton Air Service Committee, Inc which held a campaign that raised $425,000 in two days and purchased 4,520.47 acres (18.2937 km2) northeast of Dayton, greatly expanding the available land adjacent to Wilbur Wright Field and the Huffman Prairie Flying Field. In 1924, the Committee presented the deeds to President Calvin Coolidge for the construction of a new aviation engineering center.

On July 6, 1931, a portion of Wright Field east of Huffman Dam was separated from Wright Field and redesignated "Patterson Field" in honor of both Lieutenant Frank Stuart Patterson and the contribution of the Patterson family.

Patterson Field and the adjacent Wright Field were officially merged on January 13, 1948 as a base for the newly created U.S. Air Force, and was named the Wright-Patterson Air Force Base ("Wright-Patt" as it is called colloquially).

Patterson is interred at Woodland Cemetery in Dayton.
