= Pomilio Gamma =

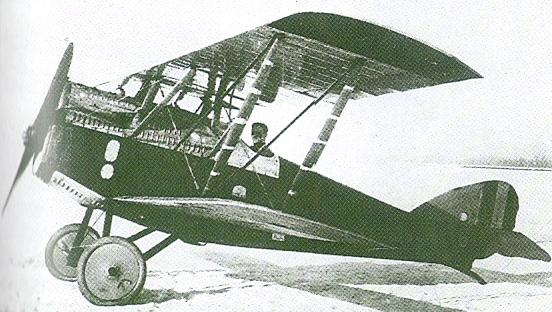
- The first Gamma prototype

General information
- Type: Fighter
- National origin: Italy
- Manufacturer: Pomilio
- Primary user: Italy
- Number built: 2

History
- First flight: 1918

The Pomilio Gamma was an Italian fighter prototype of 1918.

== Design and development ==
=== Gamma ===
The Pomilio company of Turin designed and manufactured the Gamma, a wooden, single-seat, single-bay biplane with wings of unequal span, the upper wing being of greater span than the lower. It was powered by a 149-kilowatt (200-horsepower) SPA 6A water-cooled engine driving a two-bladed tractor propeller. It had fixed, tailskid landing gear.

The Gamma prototype first flew early in 1918. An Italian official commission observed a demonstration of it, and concluded that although it was fast and had good maneuverability, its rate of climb was insufficient to merit a production order.

=== Gamma IF ===
Pomilio addressed the Gamma's shortcomings by developing a second prototype, the Gamma IF, equipped with a more powerful Isotta Fraschini V.6 engine rated at 186 kilowatts (250 horsepower). An official commission saw a demonstration of the Gamma IF in 1918 but initially could not agree on whether it warranted a production order. During the final weeks of World War I, the commission finally decided to order a small number of Gamma IF fighters; however, the aircraft never entered active service.

== Variants ==
Gamma
First prototype with SPA 6A engine
Gamma IF
Second prototype with Isotta Fraschini engine

== Operators ==
Kingdom of Italy

- Corpo Aeronautico Militare

== Specifications (Gamma IF) ==
Data from Green, William, and Gordon Swanborough The Complete Book of Fighters: An Illustrated Encyclopedia of Every Fighter Aircraft Built and Flown, New York: SMITHMARK Publishers, 1994, ISBN 0-8317-3939-8

General characteristics

- Crew: 1
- Length: 6.30 m (20 ft 8 in)
- Wingspan: 7.99 m (26 ft 2.5 in)
- Wing area: 21.90 m^{2} (235.74 sq ft)
- Empty weight: 680 kg (1,499 lb)
- Gross weight: 950 kg (2,094 lb)
- Powerplant: 1 × Isotta Fraschini V.6 piston engine , 186 kW (250 hp)

Performance

- Maximum speed: 225 km/h (140 mph, 120 kn)
- Endurance: 3 hours

Notes:

- Time to 3,000 m (9,842 ft): 7 min 30 sec
