= Pomilio FVL-8 =

FVL-8
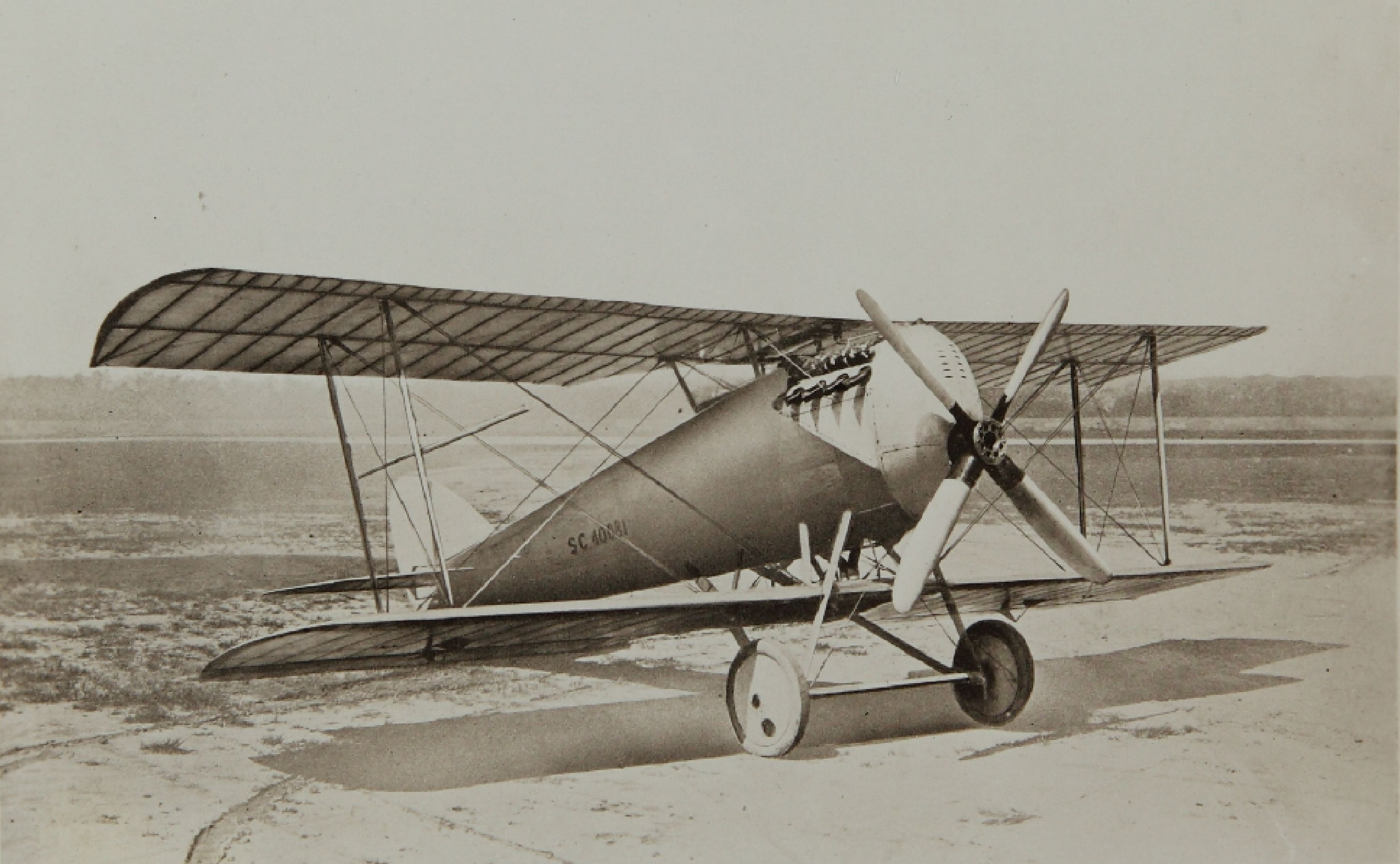

General information
- Type: Fighter
- National origin: United States
- Manufacturer: Engineering Division/Fabbrica Aeroplani Ing. O. Pomilio
- Designer: Otterino Pomilio
- Number built: 7

History
- First flight: February 1919

The Pomilio FVL-8 was a biplane fighter aircraft built by Fabbrica Aeroplani Ing. O. Pomilio for Engineering Division of the Aviation Section, U.S. Signal Corps.

== Development and design ==
The FVL-8 was constructed of a wood framework and covered in plywood. The wings were separated from the fuselage by struts. It was powered by a Liberty 8 engine, and armed by two machine guns. Six prototypes were constructed, the first had its first flight in February 1919. No order for production aircraft was received.

== Specifications ==
Data from Angelucci, 1987. p. 197.

General characteristics

- Crew: 1
- Length: 21 ft 8 in (6.60 m)
- Wingspan: 26 ft 8 in (8.12 m)
- Height: 8 ft 2 in (2.48 m)
- Wing area: 284 sq ft (26.38 m^{2})
- Empty weight: 1,726 lb (783 kg)
- Gross weight: 2,285 lb (1,036 kg)
- Powerplant: 1 × Liberty 8 , 290 hp (220 kW)

Performance

- Maximum speed: 133 mph (214 km/h, 116 kn)

== Bibliography ==
- Angelucci, Enzo (1987). The American Fighter from 1917 to the Present. New York: Orion Books. ISBN 0-517-56588-9.
