= Isaac M. Laddon =

American aeronautical engineer and designer

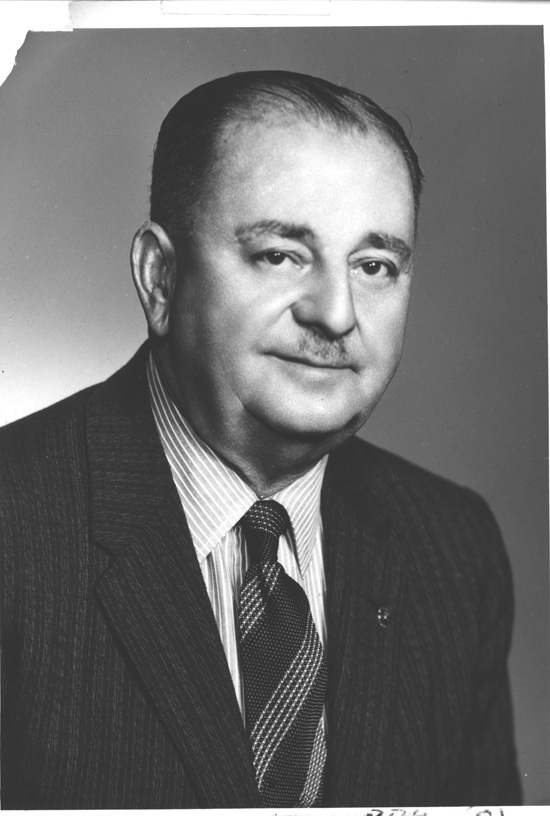

Isaac Machlin Laddon (25 December 1894 – 14 January 1976) was an American aeronautical engineer and designer.

== Biography ==
Laddon was born in Garfield, New Jersey.

He was educated at McGill University in Montreal from 1915. He joined the U.S. Air Service Experimental and Engineering Test Center at McCook Field, Ohio in 1917, and within two years had become the chief designer for all large aircraft development. He held numerous patents in the aviation industry.

He joined Consolidated Aircraft Company as chief engineer in 1927. His designs included the Admiral Flying Boat of 1928, the first in a series of famous Consolidated seaplanes that evolved into the highly regarded PBY Catalina, of which a total of 3,282 were built. His B-24 Liberator had both the largest production run of any World War II bomber, and is still listed as the most-produced multi-engined aircraft of any type in history. He was also responsible for designing the streamlined Convair airliners used by commercial airlines throughout the world.

He died in San Diego.
