= Packard-Le Père LUSAC-11 =

1918 multi-role combat aircraft family by the Engineering Division, US Army Air Service

LUSAC-11
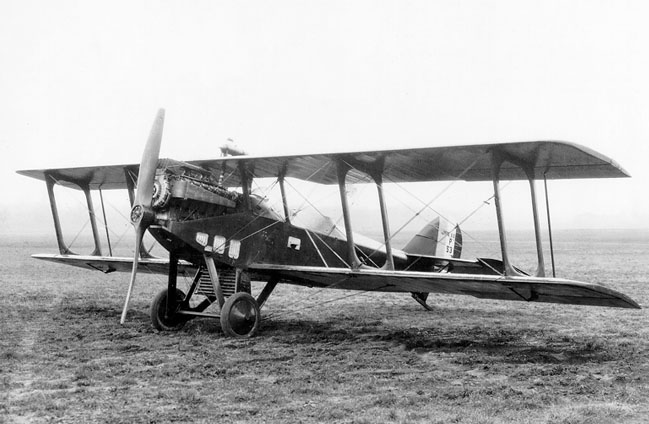
- The LUSAC-11 which broke the World altitude record in 1920 and 1921

General information
- Type: Fighter aircraft
- National origin: United States of America
- Manufacturer: Engineering Division/Packard
- Designer: Georges Lepère
- Primary user: United States Army Air Service
- Number built: 30

History
- First flight: 15 May 1918
- Developed into: Waterman 3-L-400

The LUSAC-11 ("Lepère United States Army Combat") is an early American two-seat fighter aircraft. It was a French design, commissioned and built in the United States during World War I and ordered in large numbers by the United States Army Air Corps, but these were canceled at the end of the war, and only 30 were built. The type was used for experimental purposes, setting several altitude records during the 1920s.

== Design and development ==
When the U.S. entered World War I, the Signal Corps had just 55 aircraft, none fit for combat. The American Expeditionary Force was equipped with French types, and the LUSAC was part of a plan to build French designs in the U.S.

Georges Lepère, a member of the French Aeronautical Mission to the United States, was tasked by the Engineering Division of the United States Army Air Service to design a two-seat escort fighter. His design was a two-bay biplane with upper and lower wings of equal span with forward stagger. It was of wood and fabric construction, with the fuselage consisting of a wooden box girder with plywood covering. It was powered by a 425 hp (317 kW) Liberty L-12 engine cooled by a radiator faired into the upper wing. Armament was two .30 inch (7.62 mm) machine guns synchronized to fire through the propeller, with two Lewis guns flexibly mounted on a Scarff ring at the observer's cockpit.

Large orders for the new design were placed, with Packard, Brewster & Co., and the Fisher Body Corporation, a total of 3,525 ordered. The first prototype made its maiden flight at McCook Field, Dayton, Ohio, on 15 May 1918. Despite a forced landing due to fuel starvation on its first flight, testing proved successful, with speeds of 136 mph (219 km/h) being reached. Only two prototypes and 25 production aircraft (by Packard) were completed by the Armistice that marked the end of World War I, and led to mass cancellation of outstanding orders for the LUSAC-11.

Three additional aircraft were completed with 420 hp (317 kW) Bugatti 16 engines as LUSAC-21s. These were delivered in August 1919.

In addition, three strafer aircraft were built, as LUSAGH (Le Père United States Army Ground Harassment"), one with Bugatti engine (LUSAGH-21), two with Liberty engines (LUSAGH-11). There was also an experimental triplane, the LUSAO-11 ("Le Père United States Army Observation), which used two Liberty L-12As.

== Operational history ==
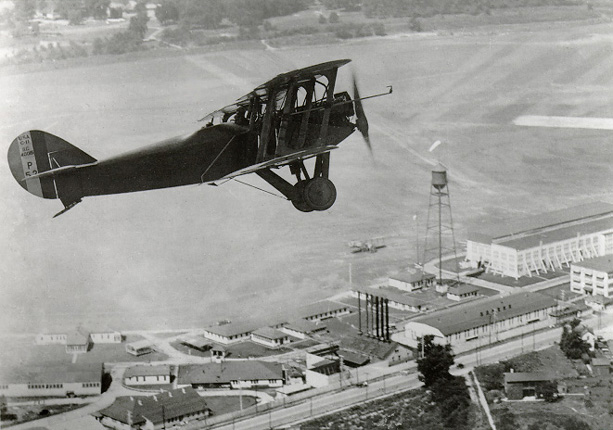
LUSAC-11 record-setter over McCook Field.

Two LUSAC-11s were sent to France for evaluation by the Army Air Service just before the end of the War, which resulted in the type being considered unsuitable for combat. A further aircraft was sent for evaluation by the French Aéronautique Militaire.

The LUSACs saw no squadron service, being used as liaison aircraft by US Military attaches in Europe, and for trials work in the United States. One LUSAC-11, fitted with one of the first turbochargers, flown by Major Rudolph William Schroeder (de) made an attempt for the world altitude record on 27 February 1920. Schroeder's oxygen supply failed during the attempt, causing the pilot to pass out, only regaining consciousness close to the ground. He was hospitalized after the near-disaster. Nevertheless, the aircraft had reached a height of 33,113 feet (10,099 m), a new world record. The same aircraft was flown to a height of 34,508 ft (10,518 m) on 28 September 1921 by Lieutenant John A. Macready, for which he won the Mackay Trophy. The record held for almost two years.

== Surviving aircraft ==
A single LUSAC-11 survives today, preserved at the National Museum of the United States Air Force at Wright-Patterson Air Force Base.

== Operators ==
United States

- United States Army Air Service

== Specifications (LUSAC-11) ==
Data from The American Fighter

General characteristics

- Crew: 2
- Length: 25 ft 3 in (7.70 m)
- Wingspan: 41 ft 7 in (12.67 m)
- Height: 10 ft 7 in (3.23 m)
- Wing area: 415.6 sq ft (38.61 m^{2})
- Empty weight: 2,561 lb (1,162 kg)
- Gross weight: 3,746 lb (1,699 kg)
- Fuel capacity: 73 US gal (61 imp gal; 280 L)
- Powerplant: 1 × Liberty L-12 liquid-cooled V12 engine, 425 hp (317 kW)

Performance

- Maximum speed: 133 mph (214 km/h, 116 kn) at sea level
- Cruise speed: 118 mph (190 km/h, 103 kn)
- Range: 320 mi (510 km, 280 nmi)
- Service ceiling: 20,200 ft (6,200 m)
- Time to altitude: 6 min to 6,500 ft (1,980 m)

Armament

- Guns:
  - 2× .30 in (7.62mm) M1917 or M1918 Marlin-Rockwell machine guns on the upper fuselage
  - 2× .30 in (7.62mm) Lewis guns in the observer's cockpit
