= Ralph Bottriell =

American military parachutist

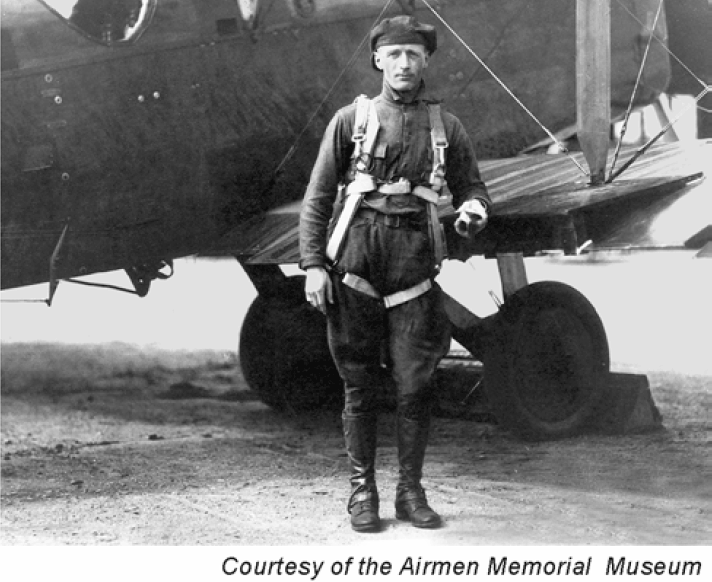
Sergeant Ralph W Bottriell was an Experimental Parachute Tester for the United States Army.

Ralph W. Bottriell (1885 – December 26, 1943) was the first American military member to jump from an aircraft using a manually operated backpack parachute. Bottriell was considered "the dean of parachute jumpers" and made over 500 jumps.

== Life ==
Bottriell performed his first parachute jump in Nashville, Michigan, at the age of 16. He enlisted in the U.S. Army in 1917.

On May 19, 1919, Bottriell jumped from a U.S. Army airplane in McCook Field, Ohio, using a backpack parachute he designed. It featured a "D" ring which allowed the jumper to open the parachute at will. This parachute design was credited with being the forerunner for parachutes developed later by the U.S. Air Force.

He made his last jump in 1927 at the Brooks Air Force Base in Texas, where he was a parachute instructor.

Bottriell received the Distinguished Flying Cross in 1932. At the time, he was stationed at Kelly Field in Texas.

Bottriell retired in 1940. He died on December 26, 1943, of natural causes.
