= McCook Field =

US Army airfield and aviation experimentation station in Dayton, OH in use 1917-27

- Dayton, Ohio
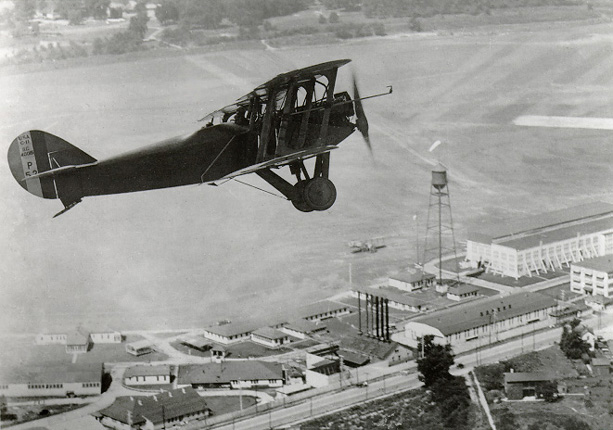
- Major Rudolph W. Schroeder(de) set a 30,900 foot two-man altitude record in a Packard-Le Peré LUSAC-11 Biplane at McCook Field, 24 September 1919

Site information
- Type: Aircraft Flight Testing
- Controlled by: United States Army Air Service

Location
- Coordinates: 39°46′33″N 84°11′27″W

Site history
- Built: 1917
- In use: 1917–1927
- Battles/wars: World War I

McCook Field was an airfield and aviation experimentation station in Dayton, Ohio, United States. It was operated by the Aviation Section, U.S. Signal Corps and its successor the United States Army Air Service from 1917 to 1927. It was named for Alexander McDowell McCook, an American Civil War general and his brothers and cousins, who were collectively known as "The Fighting McCooks".

== History ==
In 1917, anticipating a massive need for military airplanes by the United States during World War I, six Dayton businessmen including Edward A. Deeds formed the Dayton-Wright Company in Dayton, Ohio. In addition to building a factory in Moraine, Ohio, Deeds built an airfield on property he owned in Moraine for use by the company. Deeds was also interested in building a public aviation field along the Great Miami River approximately one mile (1.6 km) north of downtown Dayton, purchasing the property in March 1917. He called it North Field to differentiate it from the South Field in Moraine.

The United States entered the war before he could develop North Field. Deeds sold his interest in the Dayton-Wright Company to become a member of the Aircraft Production Board, on which he served until August 2, 1917, then accepted a commission as a colonel in the Signal Corps and became Chief of the Equipment Division. Its responsibility was to oversee the building of aircraft and engines needed for the Aviation Section. His frustration with the fragmentation of the division and slow progress of the aviation effort led to a recommendation to construct a temporary experimental engineering station. His recommendation for leasing South Field for that purpose was accepted by the War Department but was objected to by the Dayton-Wright Company, which needed the field for wartime production of new aircraft, in particular the DH-4. Instead, the Army leased North Field and opened McCook Field on December 4, 1917.

McCook Field's flying field was in the flood plain of the Great Miami River between the confluences of that river, the Stillwater River, and the Mad River. (now the present-day Dayton park, Kettering Field, named for Charles F. Kettering) and its structures were located on what was previously the site of the Parkside Homes housing project before its demolition in 2008. Constructed during World War I, it became the location of the Aviation Service's Engineering Division in 1919.

World War I Air Service units assigned to McCook Field were:

- 246th Aero Squadron, November 1917

Re-designated as Squadron "A", July–August 1918

- 881st Aero Squadron (Repair), February 1918

Re-designated as Squadron "B", July–August 1918

- Detachment #10, Air Service, Aircraft Production, August 1918-May 1919

Organized as consolidation of Squadrons "A" and "B"

The field was unusual in that to optimize flight test conditions, it had a smooth-surfaced runway built of macadam and cinders rather than the bumpy grass runways nearly universal at the time. However, to use the prevailing winds, the runway transected the narrow dimension of the tract and ended at a flood levee. It was 1,000 feet (300 m) in length at the beginning and never exceeded 2,000 feet (610 m). A huge sign painted across the front of McCook's main hangar prominently warned arriving pilots: THIS FIELD IS SMALL. USE IT ALL. Urban growth encroached on the space and larger aircraft being developed overtaxed the field's grass surface. Ultimately, the field became too small for its purpose.

The Army had from the start intended at some point to relocate McCook's operations to a permanent home at Langley Field, Virginia, but Dayton's civic leaders did not want to lose this center of innovation and industry. John H. Patterson, President of the National Cash Register Corporation (NCR), vowed to keep Army aviation in Dayton and began a local campaign to raise money to purchase a tract of land large enough for a new airfield. The land would then be donated to the U.S. Army with the understanding that it would become the permanent home of the Engineering Division.

Patterson died in 1922, and his son (and successor at NCR), Frederick B. Patterson organized the Dayton Air Service Committee, a coalition of prominent Daytonians and businessmen dedicated to raising the money necessary to purchase land for the Air Service. Their intensive campaign netted $425,000, enough to purchase 4,520 acres (18.29 km²) of land east of Dayton, including Wilbur Wright Field adjacent to Fairfield (now Fairborn), Ohio, already leased by the Air Service. The area encompassed the Wright brothers' flying field on Huffman Prairie. The Dayton Air Service Committee's offer far exceeded all others, and in August 1924 President Calvin Coolidge accepted Dayton's gift. This facility would later become Wright-Patterson Air Force Base.

In March 1923 Time Magazine reported Thomas Edison sent Dr. George de Bothezaat a congratulations for a successful helicopter test flight. Edison wrote, "So far as I know, you have produced the first successful helicopter." The helicopter was tested at McCook's Field and remained airborne for 2 minutes and 45 seconds at a height of 15 feet.

McCook Field closed concurrent with the opening of the new Wright Field. Beginning in March 1927, 4500 tons of its materiel and assets were relocated by truck to the new base, with 85% moved in 1,859 truckloads by June 1. On April 1, 1927, demolition of McCook began with the former enlisted barracks, and by early 1928 all infrastructure at McCook had been completely leveled and cleaned up. The field was closed to landings of U.S. government aircraft on June 30 by order of the Air Corps, but by then all aircraft had shifted to the Fairfield Air Intermediate Depot's field. Ironically, one of the last flights received at McCook occurred after the order, on July 20, when the Atlantic-Fokker C-2 transport formerly based at McCook flew in from Milwaukee with Lts. Lester J. Maitland and Albert F. Hegenberger, two of its most distinguished alumni. The pair had successfully accomplished the first transpacific flight, flying the Bird of Paradise to Hawaii on June 28–29, and were on a triumphant tour whose stops included their hometowns and McCook, where the flight project started in 1919.

== Achievements ==
- Aerial application, or "Crop Dusting"
- Aircraft pressurization
- Airport service vehicles
- First American military person to jump with a manually operated backpack parachute (Ralph Bottriell)
- Landing lights for aircraft
- The free fall parachute

== See also ==
- List of Training Section Air Service airfields
- Nemeth Parasol
