= Fairfield Aviation General Supply Depot =

Military facility in Ohio, United States

Coordinates: 39°46′52″N 84°06′35″W

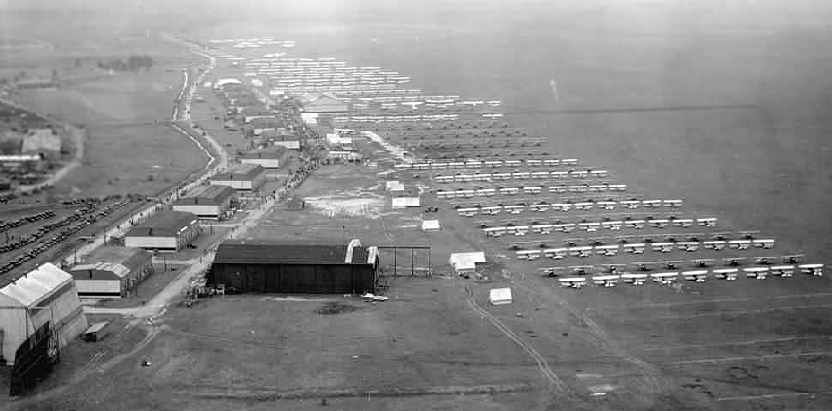

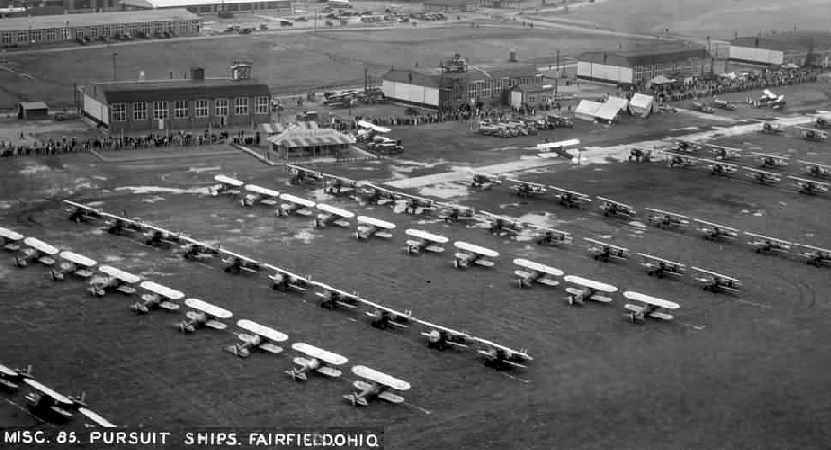
Buildings and biplanes at the Fairfield Aviation General Supply Depot in the 1920s

The Fairfield Aviation General Supply Depot is a former Aviation Section, U.S. Signal Corps military installation, located adjacent to Wilbur Wright Field in Riverside, Ohio.

== History ==
The Fairfield Aviation General Supply Depot was constructed on 40 acres (160,000 m2) in 1917 on land purchased by the Army from the Miami Conservancy District. The land bordered Wilbur Wright Field.

Adjacent to it in order to provide support, the Fairfield Aviation General Supply Depot provided logistics support to Wilbur Wright Field and three other Signal Corps aviation schools located in the Midwest. Each day the depot received, stored, and issued equipment and supplies to Signal Corps aviation schools in the region.

In 1924, additional land was purchased and the deeds presented to President Calvin Coolidge for the construction of a new aviation engineering center. The entire acreage including the Fairfield Air Depot was designated Wright Field in honor of both Wright brothers.

Between 1925 and 1927, modern new facilities were built. Orville Wright raised the flag over the new engineering center at the official dedication ceremony on 12 October 1927. The merged facilities were renamed Wright Field in honor of the Wright brothers and became headquarters for the Material Division of the United States Army Air Corps. Wright Field retained its airfield, with the Fairfield Air Depot supporting its operations as well as the Air Corps engineering center.

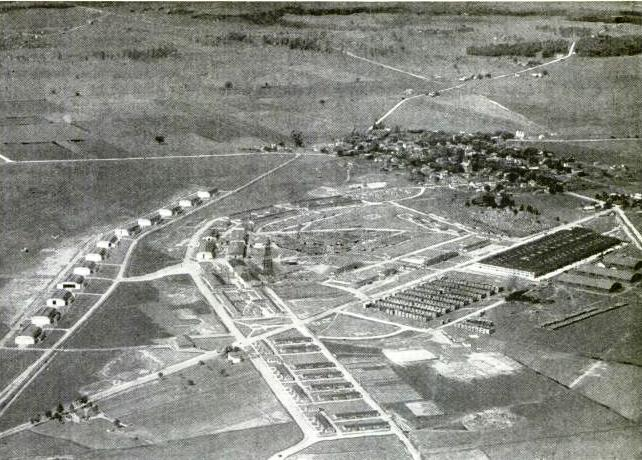
Wilbur Wright Field and the Fairfield Air Depot, 1920s

The Material Division was responsible for developing advanced aircraft, equipment, and accessories. The Division also procured and provided maintenance for all of these systems and was charged with managing the extensive Air Corps depot system.

The functions of the Division were ultimately broken into two separate commands, the MAteriel Command, later to become Air Materiel Command, and the Air Service Command. The Materiel Command, headquartered at Wright Field, was responsible for the procurement of airplanes and equipment in production quantities and for sustaining an accelerated program of testing and development.

The Air Service Command, located on Patterson Field, northeast of Wright Field, assumed responsibility for all logistics functions, including maintenance and supply. The Fairfield Air Depot on Wright Field remained active until 1946 when its facilities were moved to Patterson Field as part of Air Service Command.

The location of the Fairfield Air Depot is now the National Museum of the United States Air Force.
