= Wilbur Wright Field =

WWI era military airfield in Ohio, U.S.

- Riverside, Ohio
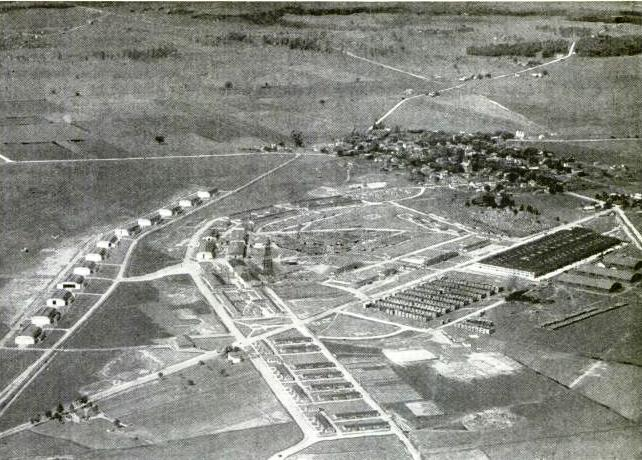
- Wilbur Wright Field, c. 1920

Site information
- Type: Pilot training airfield
- Controlled by: Air Service, United States Army; United States Army Air Forces
- Condition: National Museum of the United States Air Force

Location
- Location within Ohio
- Coordinates: 39°46′46″N 84°6′16″W

Site history
- In use: 1917–1951
- Battles/wars: World War I World War II

Garrison information
- Garrison: Training Section, Air Service

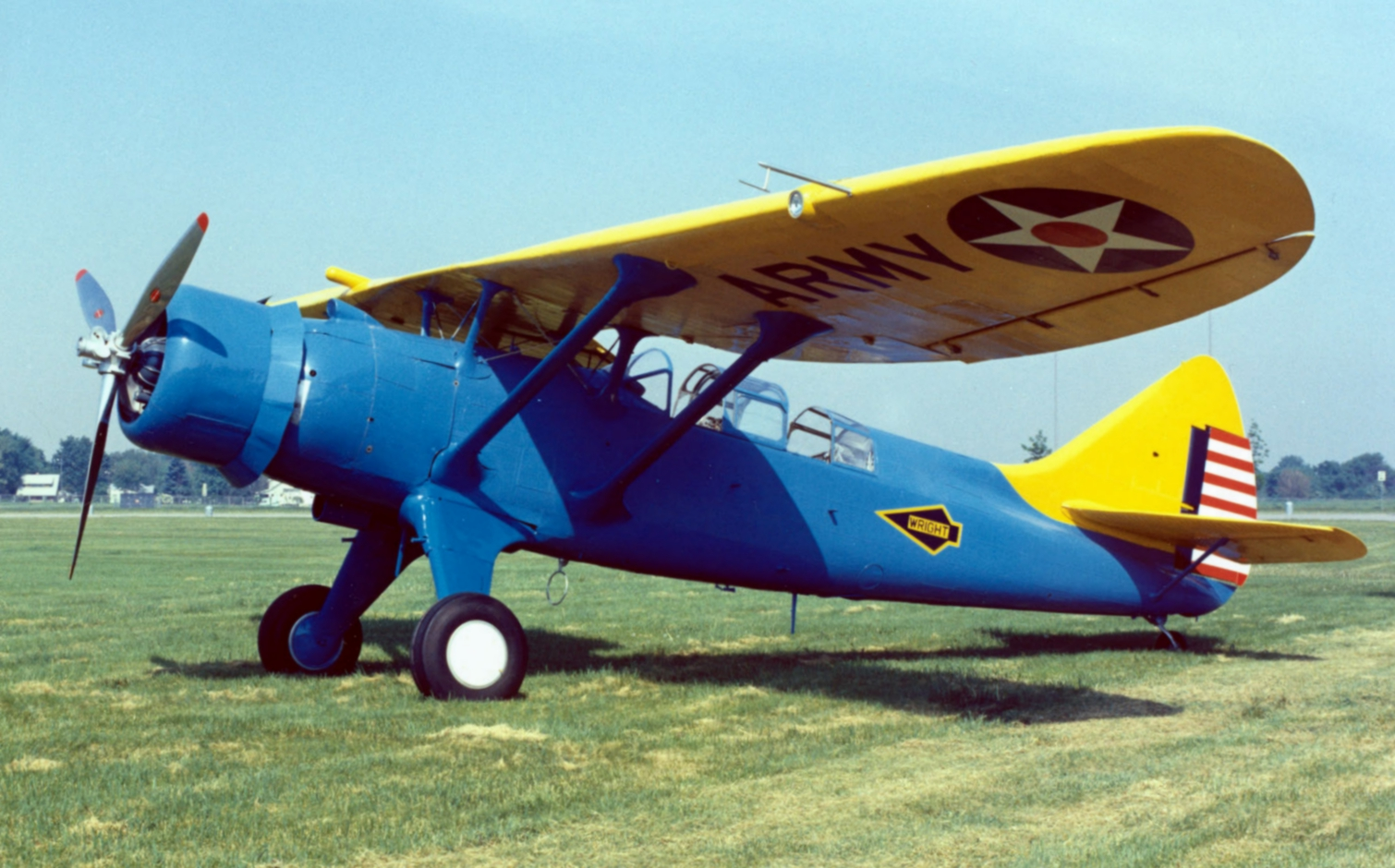
This Douglas O-46 bears the Spearhead insignia of Wilbur Wright Field (1931-1942) on its fuselage.

Wilbur Wright Field was a military installation and an airfield used as a World War I pilot, mechanic, and armorer training facility, and under different designations, conducted United States Army Air Corps and Air Forces flight testing. Located near Riverside, Ohio, the site is officially "Area B" of Wright-Patterson Air Force Base and includes the National Museum of the United States Air Force built on the airfield.

== History ==
=== World War I ===
Wilbur Wright Field was established in 1917 for World War I on 2,075 acres (840 ha) of land adjacent to the Mad River which included the 1910 Wright Brothers' Huffman Prairie Flying Field and that was leased to the Army by the Miami Conservancy District. Logistics support to Wilbur Wright Field was by the adjacent Fairfield Aviation General Supply Depot established in January 1918 and which also supplied three other Midwest Signal Corps aviation schools. A Signal Corps Aviation School began in June 1917 for providing combat pilots to the Western Front in France, and the field housed an aviation mechanic's school and an armorer's school. On 19 June 1918, Lt. Frank Stuart Patterson at the airfield was testing machine gun/propeller synchronization when a tie rod failure broke the wings off his Airco DH.4M while diving from 15,000 ft (4,600 m). Also in 1918, McCook Field near Dayton between Keowee Street and the Great Miami River began using space and mechanics at Wilbur Wright Field. Following World War I, the training school at Wilbur Wright Field was discontinued.

Training units assigned to Wilbur Wright Field

- 42d Aero Squadron, August 1917

Redesignated Squadron "I"; October 1918-February 1919

- 44th Aero Squadron, August 1917

Redesignated Squadron "K"; October 1918
Redesignated Squadron "P"; November 1918-April 1919

- 231st Aero Squadron (II), April 1918

Redesignated Squadron "A", July–December 1918; Assigned to Armorers' School

- 246th Aero Squadron (II), May 1918

Redesignated Squadron "L", October 1918-February 1919

- 342d Aero Squadron, August 1918

Redesignated Squadron "M" October 1918
Redesignated Squadron "Q" November 1918-April 1919

- 507th Aero Squadron, July 1918-April 1919
- 512th Aero Squadron (Supply), July 1918-April 1919
- 669th Aero Squadron (Supply), May 1918-April 1919
- 678th Aero Squadron (Supply), February 1918-April 1919
- 851st Aero Squadron, March 1918

Re-designated Squadron "B" July 1918-April 1919

Combat units trained at Wilbur Wright Field

- 12th Aero Squadron, July–November 1917; deployed to American Expeditionary Forces (AEF)
- 13th Aero Squadron, July–November 1917; deployed to AEF
- 20th Aero Squadron, July–November 1917; deployed to AEF
- 43d Aero Squadron, August–December 1917; transferred to Ellington Field, Texas
- 47th Aero Squadron, August 1917-February 1918; deployed to AEF
- 149th Aero Squadron, August 1917-February 1918; deployed to AEF
- 159th Aero Squadron, December 1917-February 1918; deployed to AEF
- 162d Aero Squadron, December 1917-February 1918; deployed to AEF
- 163d Aero Squadron, December 1917-February 1918; deployed to AEF
- 166th Aero Squadron, December 1917-February 1918; deployed to AEF
- 172d Aero Squadron, December 1917-February 1918; deployed to AEF

Service units trained at Wilbur Wright Field

- 19th Aero Squadron, July–November 1917; Deployed to American Expeditionary Forces
- 151st Aero Squadron, December 1917-February 1918; deployed to AEF
- 211th Aero Squadron, December 1917-February 1918; deployed to AEF
- 255th Aero Squadron, March–June 1918; deployed to AEF
- 256th Aero Squadron; March–June 1918; deployed to AEF
- 257th Aero Squadron; March–June 1918; deployed to AEF
- 258th Aero Squadron; March–June 1918; deployed to AEF
- 259th Aero Squadron; March–July 1918; deployed to AEF
- 260th Aero Squadron; March–July 1918; deployed to AEF
- 265th Aero Squadron; March–July 1918; deployed to AEF
- 287th Aero Squadron, May–July 1918; transferred to Chanute Field, Illinois
- 288th Aero Squadron, May–July 1918; transferred to Chanute Field, Illinois
- 827th Aero Squadron (Repair), February–March 1918; deployed to AEF

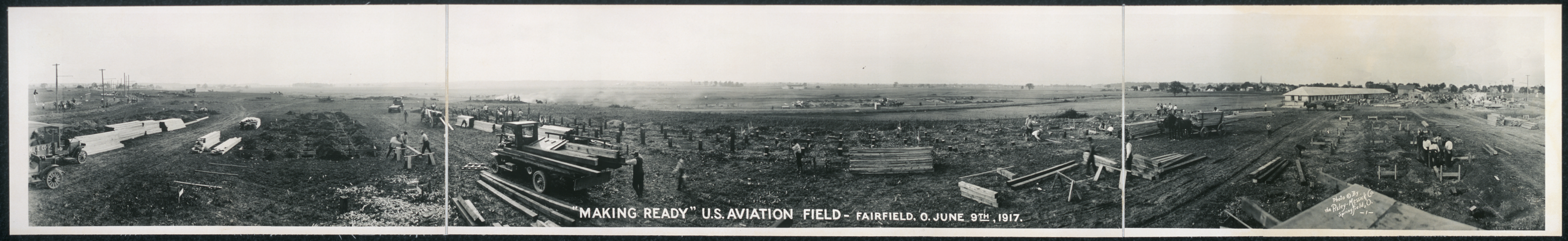
Construction in progress at Wilbur Wright Field (June 9, 1917)

=== Interwar years ===
The 1923 records for speed, distance, and endurance were set by an April 16 Fokker T-2 flight from Wilbur Wright Field, which used a 50 km (31 mi) course around the water tower, the McCook Field water tower, and a pylon placed at New Carlisle. In June 1923, an Air Service TC-1 airship "was wrecked in a storm at Wilbur Wright Field" and by 1924, the field had "an interlock system" radio beacon using Morse code command guidance (dash-dot "N" for port, dot-dash "A" for starboard) illuminating instrument board lights. The Field Service Section at Wilbur Wright Field merged with McCook's Engineering Division to form the Materiel Division on 15 October 1926 ("moved to Wright Field when McCook Field closed in 1927"). The Air Service's "control station for the model airway"—which scheduled military flights of the Airways Section—moved to Wilbur Wright Field from McCook Field in the late 1920s (originally "at Bolling Field until 1925").

=== Redesignations ===
The Fairfield Air Depot formed when the leased area of Wilbur Wright Field and the Army-owned land of the Fairfield Aviation General Supply Depot merged soon after World War I. For an aerial war game of 1929, "Fairfield" was the headquarters of the Blue air force; a Blue "airdrome north of Dayton at Troy" was strafed on May 16 ("a raid on the airdrome at Fairfield" was later expected), "Dayton" was the May 21 takeoff site for a round-trip bomber attack on New York, and "target areas at Fairfield" were used for live bombing on May 25. A provisional division was "assembled at Dayton" on May 16, 1931, for maneuvers in which "Maj. Henry H. Arnold, division G-4 (Supply), had stocks at Pittsburgh; Cleveland; Buffalo; Middletown, Pennsylvania; Aberdeen, Maryland; and Bolling Field to service units as they flew eastward." The depot remained active until 1946.

=== Wright Field ===
In 1924, the city of Dayton purchased 4,500 acres (1,821 ha), the portion of Fairfield Air Depot leased in 1917 for Wilbur Wright Field, along with an additional 750 acres (300 ha) in Montgomery County to the southwest (now part of Riverside). The combined area was named Wright Field to honor both Wright Brothers. A new installation with permanent brick facilities was constructed to replace McCook Field and was dedicated on October 12, 1927. The transfer of 4,500 tons of engineering material, office equipment and other assets at McCook Field to Wright Field began on March 25, 1927, and was 85% complete by June 1 after moving 1,859 truckloads. "The Engineering School shut down for the school year 1927-28 at Wright Field, which had the Army Air Corps Museum in Building 12.

By November 1930, "the laboratory at Wright Field" had planes fitted as flying laboratories (e.g., B-19 "flying laboratory" with "8-foot tires"), and the equipment of the 1929 Full Flight Laboratory (closed out by the Daniel Guggenheim Fund for the Promotion of Aeronautics, which had established the principle of safe fog flying) was moved to Wright Field by the end of 1931. Materiel Division’s Fog Flying Unit under First Lt. Albert F. Hegenberger used the equipment for blind landings.

=== Patterson Field ===
Patterson Field, named for Frank Stuart Patterson, was designated on 6 July 1931 as the area of Wright Field east of Huffman Dam (including Fairfield Air Depot, Huffman Prairie, and Wright Field's airfield). Patterson Field became the location of the Materiel Division of the Air Corps and a key logistics center, and in 1935, quarters were built at Patterson Field, which in 1939 still "was without runways...heavier aircraft met difficulty in landing in inclement weather." Wright Field retained the land west of the Huffman Dam and became the research and development center of the Air Corps.

=== Prewar events ===
Engineering and flight activities of the two installations after the designation of Patterson Field included numerous aviation achievements and failures prior to the bombing of Pearl Harbor:

Date	Field	Event
1932 May	Patterson	Blind landings at Patterson Field were conducted by the Fog Flying Unit using a variation of Doolitte's landing system from Mitchel Field.
1933-01	Wright	Both metal, two-place, low-wing monoplanes from Consolidated Aircraft (Y lP-25 for pursuit, XA-11 for attack) crashed during tests.
1933-05	Patterson	The Blue air force flew a simulated attack on Fort Knox representing "a rail and supply center" (the Red force's 1st Pursuit Group "maintained surveillance of Patterson Field" and relayed bombers' take off via a transport plane circling near Cincinnati.).
1933-07	Wright	The Materiel Division 1st course on the Mark XV Norden bombsight instructed "a few officers in care, maintenance, and operation" (2nd class finished September 1, 1934.)
1935-08-28	Wright	"Automatic radio navigation equipment comprising Sperry automatic pilot mechanically linked to standard radio compass" tested by Equipment Branch.
1935-10-30	Wright	The "Flying Fortress" prototype "Boeing 299 crashed during testing [after] no one had unlocked the rudder and elevator controls", killing the Flying Division chief and Boeing test pilot.
1935-12-31		"Device insuring automatic fuel transfer in airplanes with reserve fuel tanks developed by Air Corps Materiel Division."
1936 fall	Wright	Douglas Aircraft "delivered the first B-18 to Wright Field".
1936-12	Wright	The XB-15, "largest bombardment plane to date, from Boeing Plant at Seattle" arrived for testing.
1937-05-20	Patterson	The 10th Transport Group with Maj. Hugh A. Bivins commander (the group was headquartered as a Regular Army group.) was activated as the Air Corps' "operational transport unit" with C-27s and C-33s
1937-09-01	Patterson	The Air Corps Weather School began—20 of 25 in the first class graduated January 28.
1939-04-20	Patterson	"Air Corps school for autogiro training and maintenance opens".
1939-05	Wright	"First 4-blade controllable-pitch propeller known to be built in U. S. is installed on a P-36A".
1939-07-30	Wright	World record (payload): "Maj. C. V. Haynes and Capt. W. D. Old fly Army Boeing B-15 to 8200 ft. with...15½ tons".
1940-06	Wright	Construction began at Wright Field for World War II ($48,817,078 through September 1945), "the most extensive of all AAF command facilities."
1941-06	Wright	Dayton's Price Brothers Company began constructing 2 concrete USACE runways: NW-SE next to the flight line and E-W along the southern edge of the property (completed February 1942). A SW-NE runway was completed in 1944.
1941-06-21	Patterson	Air Corps Ferrying Command opened an "installation point" at Patterson Field (moved to Romulus, Michigan by August).
1941-10-17	Patterson	Air Service Command established under the Materiel Division, OCAC, from the "Air Corps Provisional Maintenance Comd" formed on March 15, 1941 (renamed Air Corps Maintenance Command April 29, elevated from provisional status on 30 June). ASC was removed from the Material Div on 11 December; "stored, overhauled, and repaired AAF aircraft and equipment" in World War II; and developed a network of base facilities [including] 11 air depots. (moved to Washington DC on December 15, but returned to Patterson Field on December 15, 1942.)

=== AAF and USAF base ===
The Army Air Forces Technical Base was formed on December 15, 1945, when Wright Field, Patterson Field, Dayton Army Air Field in Vandalia and Clinton County AAF in Wilmington merged. After the USAF was created, the base was renamed Air Force Technical Base in December 1947 and Wright-Patterson Air Force Base in January 1948.. The former Wright Field became Area B of the combined installation, the southern portion of Patterson Field became Area A, and the northern portion of Patterson Field, including the jet runway built in 1946–47, Area C.
