= Kamikaze (1937 aircraft) =

Record-Winning, Civilian, Prop-Driven Monoplane designed and built by Mitsubishi

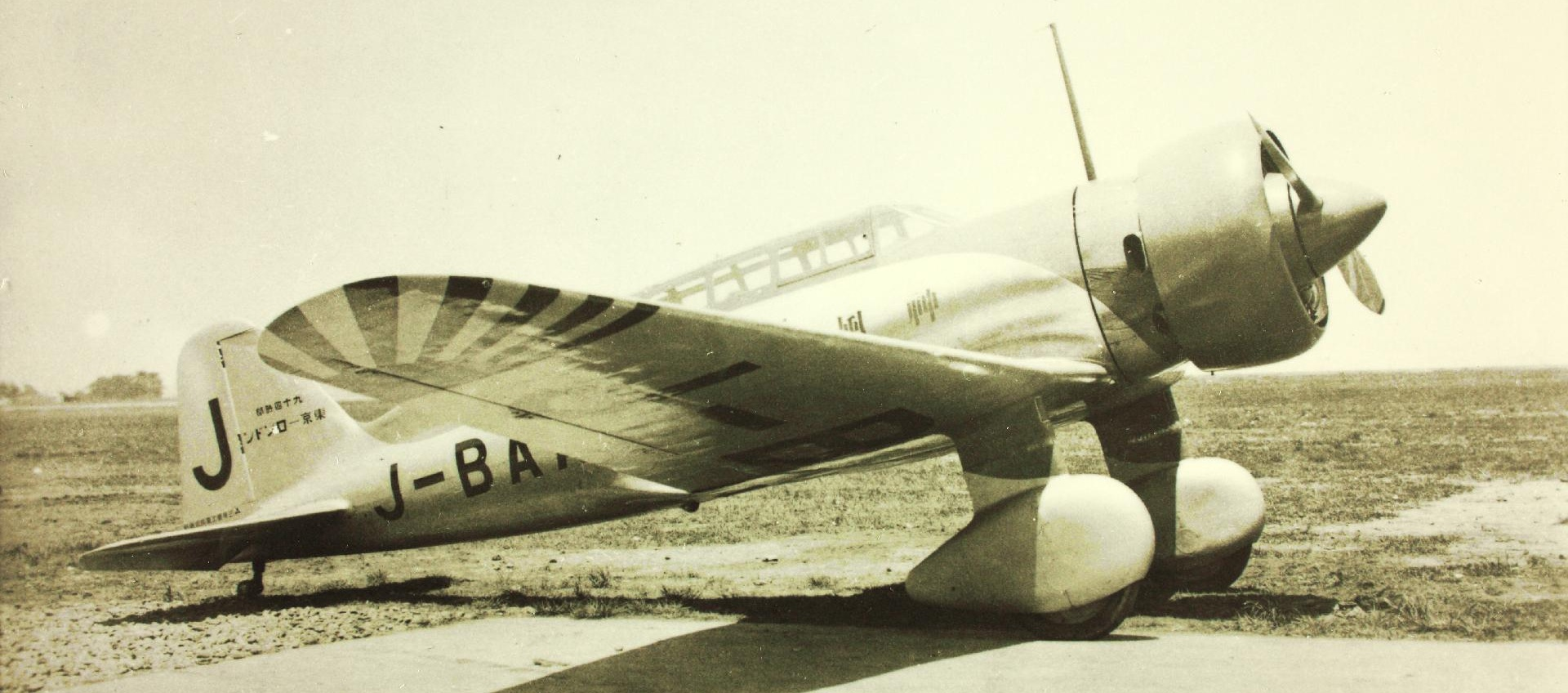
- The Kamikaze-go

General information
- Type: Mitsubishi Ki-15
- Manufacturer: Mitsubishi Heavy Industries
- Registration: J-BAAI

History
- Fate: Destroyed

Kamikaze (神風号, Kamikaze-gō) was a Mitsubishi Ki-15 Karigane airplane, (registration J-BAAI) sponsored by the newspaper Asahi Shimbun. It became famous on April 9, 1937, as the first Japanese-built aircraft to fly from Japan to Europe. The flight from Tokyo to London took 51 hours, 17 minutes and 23 seconds and was piloted by Masaaki Iinuma (1912–1941), with Kenji Tsukagoshi (1900–1943) serving as navigator.

== Background ==
In the 1930s, as the performance of aircraft was rapidly improving, air races and the setting of long-distance flight records was very popular in Europe and North America, and were often used as publicity stunts by newspapers. A French newspaper offered a substantial monetary prize for the first aircraft to fly between Paris and Tokyo within 100 hours. Many aviators had failed in the attempt, including André Japy, the French aviator whose plane crashed into the mountains of Kyūshū on the last leg of his record attempt from Paris to Tokyo.

In the 1930s, Japanese aircraft designers had made maximizing the range of their aircraft a high priority, in order to link the Japanese home islands with the Empire of Japan's overseas possessions in Taiwan, Korea, Manchuria and the South Seas Mandate. Long range capabilities also had implications for the development of military aircraft for future conflicts in China and over the Pacific Ocean - potential war theatres which offered few airfields for aircraft to refuel.

The Kamikaze K-15 airplane and its engine were designed and built in Japan, and the Japanese crews trained solely by Japanese instructors.

Flight International, 15 April 1937 noted:

Contrary to expectations, this Mitsubishi monoplane (which, incidentally was completed toward the end of March) and its engine do not appear to have built under direct licence from any American firms. Its type name is Karigane, or Wild Goose. It is reminiscent of the well-known Northrop series of single-engined mailplanes, but the resemblance is largely superficial and might apply to any machine built on the same lines and for the same purpose. The radial engine—a Nakajima Kotobuki III giving 550 h.p. (normal) at sea level and designed for a fixed-pitch airscrew, has points of similarity with the P. and W. Wasp and earlier Wright Cyclones, but is obviously of Japanese design.

== Engine ==
Nakajima Kotobuki (Jupiter) engines were widely used in civilian planes. The engine was named, in connection with Jupiter, 寿 Kotobuki, the pronunciation of the Kanji. Nakajima was using a single Kanji (Japanese character) to bring luck to the engine names. Mitsubishi used star names, and Hitachi used wind names as well.

== The Record Flight ==
The European record flight of the Kamikaze-go was sponsored by the Asahi Shimbun newspaper to celebrate the coronation of Great Britain's King George VI, and also as a goodwill flight to European countries. Kamikaze-gō was the second prototype Ki-15. It was registered J-BAAI. The airplane was painted silver with medium blue trim.

The Kamikaze-go took off from Tachikawa Airfield in Tokyo at 2:12:04 pm on April 6, 1937, with much fanfare. The aircraft flew from Tokyo via Taipei to Hanoi and Vientiane in French Indochina, then via Calcutta and Karachi in British India and Basra and Baghdad in Iraq, and then Athens, Rome and Paris in Western Europe.

The aircraft landed at London's Croydon airport to a cheering crowd of spectators at 3:30 pm on April 9. The total elapsed time since departure was 94 hours, 17 minutes and 56 seconds, with actual flight time for the whole distance of 15,357 km of was 51 hours, 19 minutes and 23 seconds (average speed: 162,8 km/h or 101 MPH). The flight was the first Fédération Aéronautique Internationale aviation record to have been won by the Japanese.

This flight to Europe made the pilot, Masaaki Iinuma (then 26 years old), a national hero, and he was acclaimed as the “Japanese Lindbergh”. Both the pilot and navigator Kenji Tsukagoshi were awarded the Légion d'honneur by the French government.

On April 12, only a few days after the record-breaking flight, the Kamikaze-go carried Prince Chichibu who was visiting England for the coronation, on a joy ride. A month later, on May 12, it was used to film the coronation ceremonies from the air. The Kamikaze-go was then flown back to Japan, duplicating its original route in the opposite direction, departing London May 14 and arriving in Osaka on May 20, and Haneda airport in Tokyo on May 21.

== Later Developments ==
After its return to Japan, the Kamikaze-go continued to work actively in a variety of capacities for the Asahi Shimbun. However, on a flight back from the south of China it encountered bad weather and had to be ditched in southern Taiwan. It was later recovered and put on display at a "Kamikaze Memorial Center" on Ikoma, Nara Prefecture. The facilities were destroyed in World War II.

To commemorate the 1937 flight of the aircraft, Asahi Shinbun produced sake bottles and cups which were made available with the image of this aircraft on it.

== Classical music ==
The flight of the Kamikaze and its triumphant journey gave rise to a piece of classical music in 1937: Hisato Ohzawa's Piano Concerto No. 3 Kamikaze. This piece of music has become better known in recent times with the release of a new CD recording by the Naxos company in 2005.
