= Numbered Air Force =

Type of organization in the US Air Force

A Numbered Air Force (NAF) is a type of organization in the United States Air Force that is subordinate to a major command (MAJCOM) and has assigned to it operational units such as wings, squadrons, and groups. A Component Numbered Air Force (C-NAF) has the additional role as an Air Force Component Command exercising command and control over air and space forces supporting a unified combatant command. Unlike MAJCOMs, which have a management role, a NAF is a tactical organization with an operational focus, and does not have the same functional staff as a MAJCOM. Numbered air forces are typically commanded by a major general or a lieutenant general.

Numeric designations for Numbered Air Forces are written in full using ordinal words (e.g., Eighth Air Force), while cardinal numerals are used in abbreviations (e.g., 8 AF). Units directly subordinate to a NAF were traditionally numbered 6XX (where XX is the NAF number). For example, the 609th Air Operations Center is a unit subordinate to the Ninth Air Force. This is no longer completely accurate, due to regular reorganization of Wings and Numbered Air Forces.

== History ==
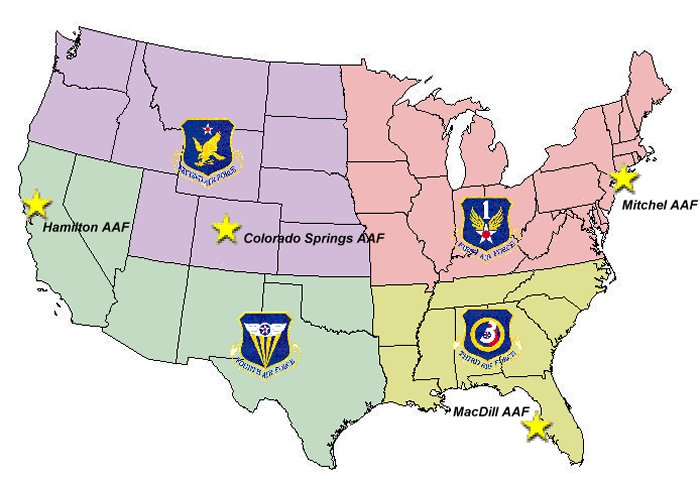
World War II Air Districts and Numbered Air Forces.

Numbered air forces began as named organizations in the United States Army Air Corps before World War II. The first four NAFs were established as the Northeast, Northwest, Southeast, and Southwest Air Districts on 19 October 1940 to provide air defense for the United States. These Air Districts were redesignated as the 1st, 2nd, 3rd, and 4th Air Forces, respectively, on 26 March 1941. Over a year after the establishment of the United States Army Air Forces on 20 June 1941, the Arabic numerals were changed to the First, Second, Third, and Fourth Air Forces on 18 September 1942. Other organizations established during this period and that became Numbered air forces include the Philippine Department Air Force (became Fifth Air Force), the Panama Canal Air Force (became Sixth Air Force), the Hawaiian Air Force (became Seventh Air Force), and the Alaskan Air Force (became Eleventh Air Force). After World War II, the US Air Force continued to use both named and numbered air forces. While named air forces were used in both tactical and support roles, numbered air forces were generally employed only in tactical roles.

As part of a peacetime restructuring in March 1946, the United States Army Air Forces were reorganized into three major operating commands: the Strategic Air Command (SAC), the Tactical Air Command (TAC), and the Air Defense Command (ADC). These commands reflected the basic air combat missions that evolved during the war, and each reported directly to General Carl Spaatz, the Commanding General, Army Air Forces. Numbered air forces served as an intermediate headquarters between these commands and the operational wings and groups. Eleven of the sixteen wartime air forces remained. The Eighth and Fifteenth Air Forces were assigned to SAC; the Third, Ninth, and Twelfth Air Forces were assigned to TAC; and the First, Second, Fourth, Tenth, Eleventh, and Fourteenth Air Forces were assigned to ADC. Second Air Force would later be transferred to SAC in 1949. The numbered air forces had both operational and administrative authority, and existed as a command level between major commands and air divisions. Although variations existed, and number air forces were often reassigned, this basic arrangement persisted throughout the Cold War.

The role of numbered air forces changed in the 1990s during the Air Force reorganization initiated by Air Force Chief of Staff General Merrill McPeak. The goal of the reorganization was to "streamline, take layers out, flatten (Air Force) organizational charts, while at the same time clarifying the roles and responsibilities of essential supporting functions." Numbered air forces were reorganized into tactical echelons focused on operations, and their administrative staff functions were eliminated. This reorganization also reduced the number of major commands, and eliminated the air divisions to place numbered air forces directly in command of operational wings.

The role of numbered air forces was again changed in 2006 with the implementation of the Component Air Force (C-NAF) concept. Some numbered air forces have an additional mission as the Air Force Component Command exercising command and control over air and space forces supporting a unified combatant command. C-NAFs have a second designation to identify their role. For example, First Air Force, a numbered air force assigned to Air Combat Command, is designated as Air Force Northern (AFNORTH) in its role as the air component of the United States Northern Command. Most C-NAFs have an Air and Space Operations Center (AOC) to provide command and control of air and space operations for the supported combatant commander.

== List of Air Forces ==
=== Numbered ===
The table below lists current and historical numbered air forces of the US Air Force, their C-NAF designation (if applicable), their current shield and station, and the major command (MAJCOM) to which they are currently assigned. Note that the lineage of some numbered air forces is continued by non-NAF organizations (e.g., the 15th Expeditionary Mobility Task Force continues the lineage of the Fifteenth Air Force). Boldface indicates a NAF or C-NAF that is currently active.

Air Force	Shield	Station	Major Command	Comments
**First Air Force (Air Forces Northern)**		Tyndall Air Force Base, Florida	Air Combat Command	C-NAF supporting U.S. Northern Command and Continental NORAD Region. In May 2022, First Air Force was officially designated as "Air Forces Space" (AFSPACE), the Air Force contribution to United States Space Command, in addition to its Northern Command and Continental NORAD roles.
**Second Air Force**		Keesler Air Force Base, Mississippi	Air Education & Training Command	Oversees all USAF non-flying technical training
**Third Air Force (Air Forces Europe)**		Ramstein Air Base, Germany	USAFE-AFAFRICA	C-NAF supporting U.S. European Command and U.S. Africa Command
**Fourth Air Force**		March Air Reserve Base, California	Air Force Reserve Command	Air Force Reserve Command NAF for all AFRC C-5, C-17, KC-135, KC-10 and C-40 units operated by Air Mobility Command and supporting U.S. Transportation Command
**Fifth Air Force**		Yokota Air Base, Japan	Pacific Air Forces	Air component to United States Forces Japan
Sixth Air Force		Howard Air Force Base, Panama		Redesignated United States Air Forces Southern Command in 1963. Inactivated in 1976.
**Seventh Air Force (Air Forces Korea)**		Osan Air Base, Korea	Pacific Air Forces	C-NAF supporting United States Forces Korea
**Eighth Air Force (Air Forces Strategic)**		Barksdale Air Force Base, Louisiana	Air Force Global Strike Command	C-NAF supporting U.S. Strategic Command and is responsible for all USAF bombers
**Ninth Air Force (Air Forces Central)**		Shaw Air Force Base, South Carolina	Air Combat Command	Established in 1983 as United States Central Command Air Forces (USCENTAF); renamed United States Air Forces Central Command (USAFCENT) in 2009. Air component of United States Central Command, a regional unified command. Responsible for air operations (either unilaterally or in concert with coalition partners) and developing contingency plans in support of national objectives for USCENTCOM's 20-nation area of responsibility in Southwest Asia.
**Tenth Air Force**		Naval Air Station Joint Reserve Base (former Carswell Air Force Base), Fort Worth, Texas	Air Force Reserve Command	Air Force Reserve Command NAF for all Air Force Reserve Command B-52 units gained by Air Force Global Strike Command; all AFRC E-3, F-22, F-15C/D, F-15E, F-16, A-10, HC-130, HH-60, C-145, U-28, MQ-1, MQ-9 and RQ-4 units gained by Air Combat Command, Pacific Air Forces and Air Force Special Operations Command, and all AFRC T-6, T-1 and T-38 "Associate" flying training units in support of Air Education and Training Command; 10 AF also has oversight for a single AFRC space wing in support of Air Force Space Command
**Eleventh Air Force**		Elmendorf Air Force Base, Alaska	Pacific Air Forces	Air Component for Alaskan Command and Alaska NORAD Region. Administrative HQ for PACAF Wings not in 5th AF or 7th AF AORs.
**Twelfth Air Force (Air Forces Southern)**		Davis–Monthan Air Force Base, Arizona	Air Combat Command	C-NAF supporting U.S. Southern Command
**Thirteenth Expeditionary Air Force**		Joint Base Pearl Harbor–Hickam, Hawaii	Pacific Air Forces	Provisional component of Pacific Air Forces since 2012.
Fourteenth Air Force (Air Forces Strategic)		Vandenberg Air Force Base, California	Air Force Space Command	C-NAF supporting U.S. Strategic Command and was responsible for U.S. space forces. In December 2019, redesignated as the United States Space Force's Space Operations Command (SPOC)
**Fifteenth Air Force**		Shaw Air Force Base, South Carolina	Air Combat Command	Redesignated 15th Expeditionary Mobility Task Force in 2003. Inactivated in 2012, 15 AF was reactivated on 20 August 2020 to consolidate the units of the Ninth Air Force and Twelfth Air Force to form a new numbered air force responsible for generating and presenting Air Combat Command's conventional forces.
**Sixteenth Air Force (Air Forces Cyber)**		Joint Base San Antonio-Lackland	Air Combat Command	C-NAF supporting U.S. Cyber Command Contains components of the inactivated 24, and 25 AF's.
Seventeenth Expeditionary Air Force		Ramstein Air Base, Germany	USAFE-AFAFRICA	Supporting United States Africa Command. Inactivated 19 July 2018, units and mission gained by Third Air Force.
**Eighteenth Air Force (Air Forces Transportation)**		Scott Air Force Base, Illinois	Air Mobility Command	C-NAF supporting U.S. Transportation Command
**Nineteenth Air Force**		Randolph Air Force Base, Texas	Air Education & Training Command	Oversees all USAF flying training, to include all undergraduate flight training and selected Formal Training Units (FTU) and Replacement Training Units (RTU)
**Twentieth Air Force (Air Forces Strategic)**		F.E. Warren Air Force Base, Wyoming	Air Force Global Strike Command	C-NAF supporting U.S. Strategic Command, oversees all USAF ICBMs
**Twenty-First Air Force**		McGuire Air Force Base, New Jersey	Air Mobility Command	Redesignated 21st Expeditionary Mobility Task Force in 2003. Inactivated in 2012. Reactivated on 5 September, 2025.
**Twenty-Second Air Force**		Dobbins Air Reserve Base, Georgia	Air Force Reserve Command	Air Force Reserve Command NAF for all AFRC C-130 and WC-130 units operated by Air Mobility Command and supporting U.S. Transportation Command
Twenty-Third Air Force (AFSOC)		Hurlburt Field, Florida	Air Force Special Operations Command	C-NAF supporting U.S. Special Operations Command. Inactivated in 2013.
Twenty-Fourth Air Force (Air Forces Cyber)		Lackland Air Force Base, Texas	Air Combat Command	Inactivated in 2019. Merged with 25 AF to create the 16 AF.
Twenty-Fifth Air Force		Lackland Air Force Base, Texas	Air Combat Command	Redesignated from Air Force Intelligence, Surveillance and Reconnaissance Agency on 29 September 2014. Inactivated in 2019. Merged with 24 AF to create 16 AF

=== Named ===
Named Air Forces operate at the same level as Numbered Air Forces. General Headquarters Air Force, the first named air force of the United States Army's air arm, began operations in 1935. The GHQ Air Force became the Air Force Combat Command in 1941. Several of the numbered air forces began as named air forces.

Since World War II other named air forces have existed in both operational and support commands. Air Forces Iceland, and the Central, Eastern, Japan, and Western Air Defense Forces, have provided air defense capability. The USAF Special Operations Force controlled operational special forces. The Crew, Flying, and Technical Training Air Forces served Air Training Command both in the air and on the ground. Pacific Air Force/FEAF (Rear) controlled both operational and support forces of Far East Air Forces. Air Materiel Force, European Area, and Air Materiel Force, Pacific Area, on the other hand, served primarily as logistics support establishments.

Since 2001 United States Air Forces Central has supervised U.S. Air Force elements engaged in the War in Afghanistan (2001–2021); since 2003 for the War in Iraq; and, with a more recent start, air refueling and other support in regard to the Yemeni Civil War.

Air Force	Shield	Station	Major Command	Comments
Air Forces Iceland		Naval Air Station Keflavik, Iceland	USAFE-AFA	Established in 1952. Performed air defense of Iceland and North Atlantic. Inactivated 28 June 2006
Air Materiel Force, European Area		Châteauroux-Déols Air Base, France	Air Force Logistics Command	From 1954 to 1962 served as the primary USAF logistics organization in Europe
Air Materiel Force, Pacific Area		Tachikawa Air Base, Japan	Air Force Logistics Command	Established as Far East Air Service Command on 14 July 1944. Activated on 18 August 1944 at Brisbane, Australia. Eventually moved its headquarters to Manila on 7 August 1945 having re-located through several intermediate locations. It was redesignated Pacific Air Service Command, U.S. Army, in January 1946, and Far East Air Materiel Command (FEAMCOM) on 1 January 1947. At Tachikawa Air Base in Japan after being activated as FEAMCOM, it effectively replaced the Japan Air Materiel Area. It was the primary USAF logistics organization in the Pacific before finally being inactivated in 1962.
Aviation Engineer Force		Wolters Air Force Base, Texas	Continental Air Command	Controlled aviation engineer organizations of the United States Army, on duty with the United States Air Force, 1951–1956
Central Air Defense Force		Richards-Gebaur Air Force Base, Missouri	Air Defense Command	Controlled ADC Radar and Interceptor units in the central United States, 1951–1960.
Crew Training Air Force		Randolph Air Force Base, Texas	Air Training Command	Provided training for air crews, 1952–1957.
Eastern Air Defense Force		Stewart Air Force Base, New York	Air Defense Command	Controlled ADC Radar and Interceptor units in the eastern United States, 1949–1960.
Flying Training Air Force		Randolph Air Force Base, Texas	Air Training Command	Provided flying training for combat crews and flying training leading to an aeronautic rating, 1951–1958.
Japan Air Defense Force		Nagoya Air Base, Japan	Far East Air Force	This air defense organization was established to replace the 314th Air Division, 1952–1954
Pacific Air Force/FEAF (Rear)		Hickam Air Force Base, Hawaii Territory	Far East Air Force	Established to control Air Force operations in the Pacific and Far East during the move of the Far East Air Forces (FEAF) from Japan to Hawaii, 1954–1957
Technical Training Air Force		Randolph Air Force Base, Texas	Air Training Command	Provided officer candidate training, indoctrination (basic) training, and technical training to Air Force personnel, 1951–1958.
USAF Special Operations Force		Eglin Air Force Base, Florida	Tactical Air Command	When the USAF Special Air Warfare Center became too large and cumbersome for center status, it was elevated to a named air force, 1962–1974.
Western Air Defense Force		Hamilton Air Force Base, California	Air Defense Command	Controlled ADC Radar and Interceptor units in the western United States, 1951–1960.

== See also ==
- Structure of the United States Air Force
