= Tsukagoshi =

Tsukagoshi (written: 塚越) is a Japanese surname. Notable people with the surname include:

- Kenji Tsukagoshi (塚越 賢爾, 1900–1943), Japanese aviator and explorer
- Sakura Tsukagoshi (塚越 さくら, born 1991), Japanese cyclist
