= Air Materiel Command =

1944-1992 United States Air Force major command

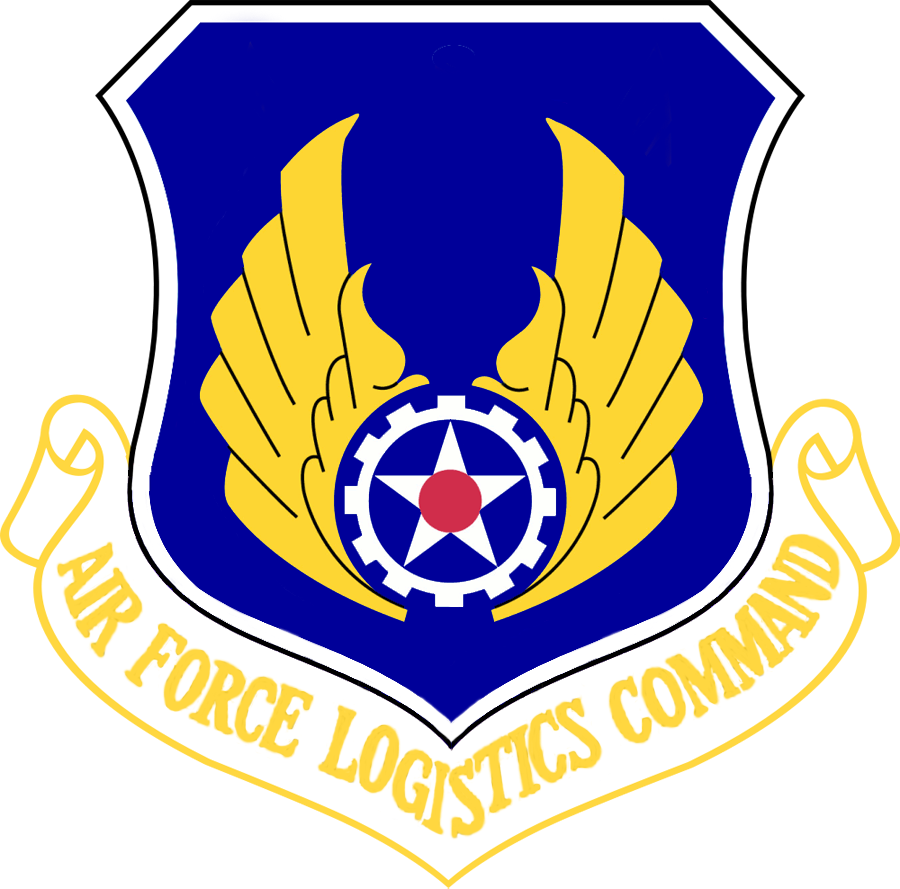
- Emblem of Air Force Logistics Command
- Active: 1944–1961
- Country: United States
- Branch: United States Army Air Forces (1944–1946); United States Air Force (1946–1961)
- Type: Major command
- Role: Logistics, depot-level aircraft maintenance, research and development
- Garrison/HQ: Wright-Patterson Air Force Base, Ohio

Air Materiel Command (AMC) was a United States Army Air Forces and United States Air Force command. Its headquarters was located at Wright-Patterson Air Force Base, Ohio. In 1961, the command was redesignated the Air Force Logistics Command (AFLC) with some of its functions transferred to the new Air Force Systems Command.

== History ==
The logistics function can be traced before the earliest days of the Air Service, when the Equipment Division of the U.S. Army Signal Corps established a headquarters for its new Airplane Engineering Department at McCook Field, Dayton, Ohio.

=== Airplane Engineering Department ===
The Airplane Engineering Department on McCook Field at Dayton, Ohio was established by the Chief Signal Officer, U.S. Army, and the Equipment Division of the U.S. Army Signal Corps on 13 October 1917. Its task was experimental engineering. The department had a Foreign Data Section by 1917. The Department established the Air School of Application in 1919. After World War I, the department was renamed the Airplane Engineering Division on 31 August 1918, under Lt Col Jesse G. Vincent (Packard co-engineer of the 1917 V-12 Liberty engine) to study and design American versions of foreign aircraft. Re-designated the Engineering Division of the U.S. Army Air Service in March 1919, it carried out the research, development and testing of military aircraft, engines, airships and accessories.

In 1920, the Engineering Division's Bureau of Aircraft Production completed the design of the Ground Attack, Experimental, (GAX) aircraft built as the Boeing GA-1, and designed the VCP-1 that won the initial Pulitzer Race in 1920 at Roosevelt Field. It also designed the TP-1 and TW-1.

Early on, the department's focus was flight testing and training. The department was renamed the Airplane Engineering Division (AED) following World War I. The AED continued its mission of flight testing and training, but also began development and engineering. One early native model, the VCP-1 was designed by resident engineers, Alfred V. Verville and Virginius E. Clark. Another aircraft tested was the MB-1, eventually used as the standard mail plane. The division also expanded operations to Wilbur Wright Field. The division also pioneered aviation safety with the use of free-fall parachutes and the development of protective clothing, closed cockpits, heated and pressurized cabins, and oxygen systems. As the stockpile of aircraft and parts grew the division was able to spend more time finding ways to enhance tools and procedures for pilots. Advancements include things like an electric ignition system, anti-knock fuels, navigational aids, improved weather forecasting techniques, stronger propellers, advancements in aerial photography, and the design of landing and wing lights for night flying.

In 1925 the division's role shifted from design and building of to acquiring and evaluating aircraft prototypes submitted by the commercial aircraft industry. This left division engineers were left free to concentrate on developing standards unique to military aircraft, reviewing designs, modifying and testing procured machines, and developing ancillary equipment to enhance military aircraft.

The Engineering Division merged with the Supply Division in 1926 to form the Material Division. The new unit required more space than McCook Field offered, so in an effort to keep the Air Service presence at Dayton, a local interest group led by John H. Patterson and his son Frederick bought 4,520 acres (18.3 km^{2}) of land, including Wilbur Wright Field and donated it to the Air Service, creating Wright Field. From Wright Field the division continued to work on aviation advancements including engine design, navigation and communications equipment, cockpit instrumentation, electrically heated flight clothing, and in-flight refueling equipment. The Physiological Research Laboratory led pioneering research in pilot exposure to extremes of speed, pressure, and temperature. Specific advancements of the division in the 1930s include the Norden bombsight, internal bomb bay, and power-operated gun turret.

=== Materiel Division ===
The Materiel Division was set up near Dayton, Ohio on 15 January 1926. The Materiel Division, controlled by the Office of the Chief of Air Corps (OCAC), possessed many characteristics of a major command. It brought together four major functions performed previously by three organizations: research and development (R&D), procurement, supply, and maintenance.

The Engineering Division merged in October 1926 with the Air Service's Supply Division (formed by 1919) to form the Materiel Division of the newly established Army Air Corps. It undertook Army aviation procurement, supply and maintenance activities.

With the construction of nearby Wilbur Wright Field, McCook Field was closed on 1 April 1927, and was subsequently demolished after its assets moved to the new Wright Field, the latter serving as the Air Corps', and later the Army Air Forces', principal R&D center from 1927 to 1947, including the Physiological Research Laboratory which opened in 1935. By 22 August 1935, the division operated an Army Aeronautical Museum at Wright Field, and by 22 November 1935, had an "Industrial War Plans Section". F.B. Vose became the Materiel Division commander on 19 October 1940, with the division employing procurement inspectors at Wright Field the same year. The division had four Field Service Sections: San Antonio, Fairfield, Middletown, and Sacramento.

Then-Brigadier General Benjamin Foulois had a year as Chief of the Materiel Division at Wright Field from June 1929 to July 1930.

American aviation development fell behind its European rivals after the mid-1930s when Germany started a continental arms race. The threat of war at the decade's end began to change the situation. During the late 1930s American industry spent over $100 million annually on aviation research. University grants grew and military personnel enrolment in science courses increased.

The Air Corps Maintenance Command was established under the Materiel Division on June 25, 1941 - less than a week after the creation of the USAAF itself on June 20, 1941 - to control supply and maintenance and retained the "Air Corps" designation that remained in effect for the USAAF's training and logistics units. On 11 December 1941, with United States newly engaged in World War II, these four functions were divided between two organizations.

=== Air Service Command ===
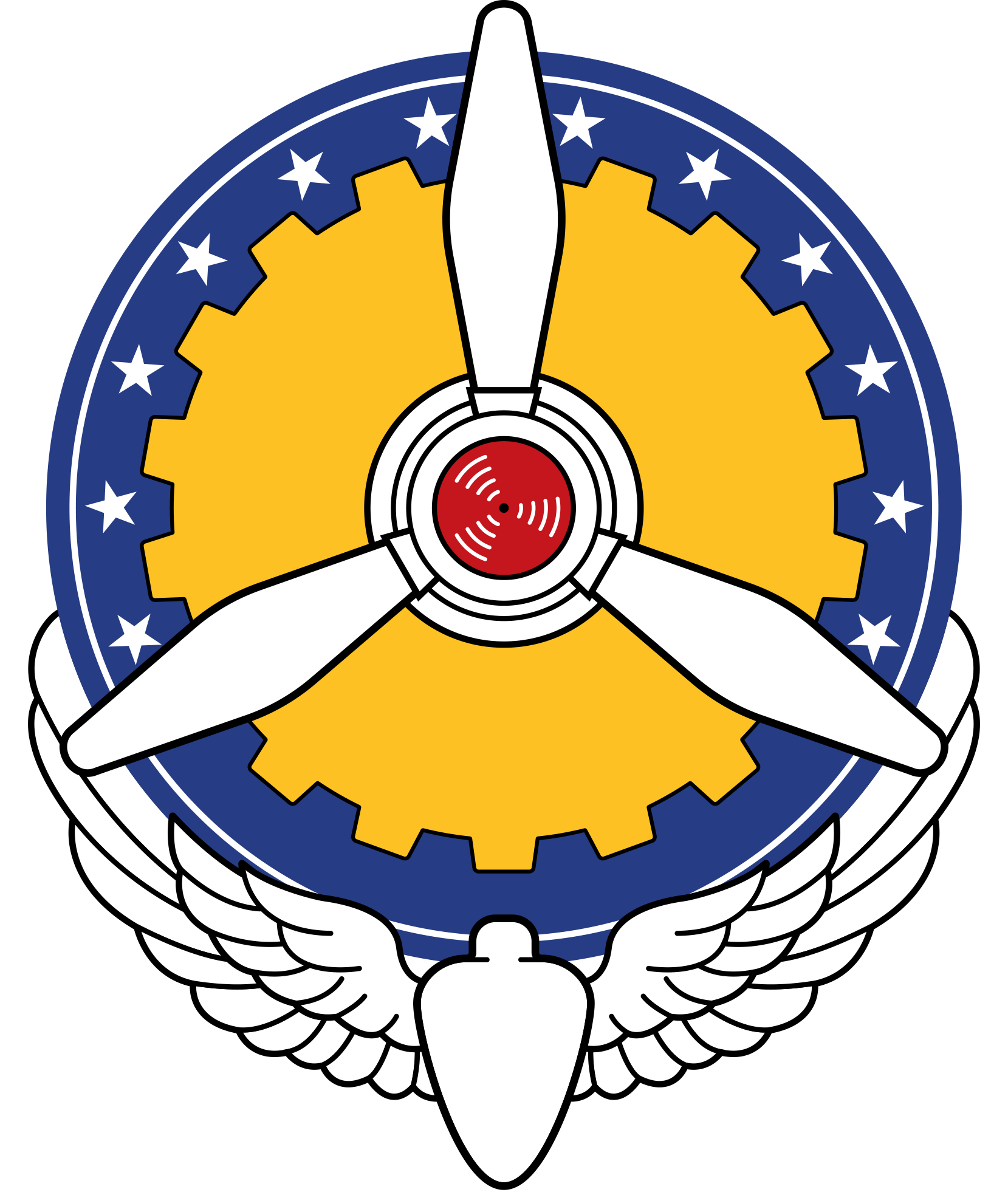
Air Service Command (U.S. Air Force graphic by Kent Bingham) via DVIDS

Maintenance Command was redesignated Air Service Command and kept responsibility for supply and maintenance functions in October 1941 and continued to be headquartered at Patterson Field.

The chief of the Air Service Command, Brig. Gen. Henry J. F. Miller, was charged with supervision in the United States of all AAF activities pertaining to storage and issue of supplies procured by the Air Corps and with overhaul, repair, maintenance, and salvage of all Air Corps equipment and supplies beyond the limits of the first two echelons of maintenance. The command was directed to compile AAF requirements for Air Corps and other supplies, to procure equipment and supplies needed for the operation and maintenance of AAF units, to prepare and issue all technical orders and instructions regarding Air Corps materiel, and to exercise technical control* over air depots outside of the continental limits of the United States. In addition, ASC received responsibility for coordination with the Army technical services in the supply and maintenance of equipment and supplies procured by them for the use of the AAF. The new command was separated from the Materiel Division but remained a part of the Office of the Chief of Air Corps.

Between October 1941 and March 1942 the Air Service Command remained under the jurisdiction of the Chief of the Air Corps. Immediately after the beginning of the war it moved its headquarters to Washington, where it began operations on 15 December 1941. But a large portion of the headquarters organization remained at Wright Field, where it carried on the greater part of the command's activities. On 15 December 1942, its headquarters moved back to Dayton, establishing itself at Patterson Field, immediately adjacent to Wright Field.

On 9 March 1942, the Air Service Command now became one of the major AAF commands, with relatively clear lines of responsibility and authority. Four air service area commands (San Antonio, Fairfield (Ohio), Middletown (Penn.), and Sacramento), successors to the maintenance wings (and field service sections, originally activated in 1940), had been activated in December 1941 to supervise the depots in given geographical areas. The depots, of which there were eleven by April 1942, became the centers of depot control areas, which directed the activities of sub-depots within defined geographical limits. Unfortunately, the boundaries of some of the depot control areas overlapped those of air service areas, and since the depots were the real focal points of supply and maintenance activities, the air service areas never attained the status of fully functioning ASC subcommands. In November 1942, Maj. Gen. Walter H. Frank took command of the Air Service Command and Gen. Miller would go on to England to command the VIII Air Force Service Command. The air service areas were disbanded on 1 February 1943, to be succeeded by air depot control area commands, which were simply the eleven former depot control areas under a new name. The elimination of the four air service areas was apparently justified by subsequent operations; according to Gen. Frank, the step proved "most beneficial."

In May 1943 the air depot control area commands were redesignated air service commands with appropriate geographical designations, and from then to the end of the war the ASC conducted its operations in the continental United States through its eleven air service commands, each serving a separate geographical area. These air service commands included the Middletown Air Service Command (Olmsted Field, Middletown, Pennsylvania), Mobile ASC, Ogden Air Service Command, Oklahoma City Air Service Command, Rome Air Service Command, Sacramento Air Service Command, the San Antonio Air Service Command, the San Bernardino Air Service Command, Warner Robins Air Service Command, Warner Robins, as well as five-six others. In 1944 the air service commands were redesignated air technical service commands.

The Materiel Division was assumed responsibility for R&D and procurement, and was redesignated Air Corps Materiel Command on 1 April 1942. This became Air Force Materiel Command in April 1942; Materiel Command in April 1943, and AAF Materiel Command on 15 January 1944. On 17 July 1944, Air Service Command and AAF Materiel Command were placed under a new organization, AAF Materiel and Services. On 31 August 1944, AAF Materiel and Services was redesignated Army Air Forces Technical Service Command.

The 4000th Army Air Forces Base Unit (Command) was among units assigned directly to AAF Technical Service Command when it was established at Wright-Patterson Field on 1 April 1944. Chico Army Air Field transferred to the ATSC on 15 October 1944.

=== Air Technical Services Command ===
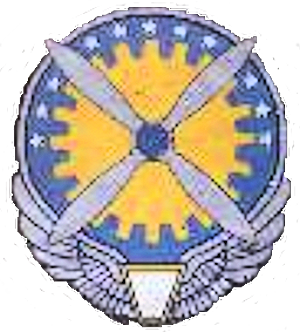
Emblem of Air Technical Service Command

Army Air Forces Technical Service Command was redesignated Air Technical Service Command (ATSC) on 1 July 1945.

By 1945, 14 bases in the United States were home to Air Technical Service Commands: Newark, New Jersey; Fairfield, California; Miami, Florida; Middletown, Pennsylvania; Mobile, Alabama; Ogden, Utah; Oklahoma City, Oklahoma; Oakland, California; Rome, New York; Sacramento, California; San Antonio, Texas; San Bernardino, California; the Spokane Air Technical Service Command at Spokane Army Air Field, Washington State; and Warner Robins, Georgia. In 1945, planning began for a separate, independent United States Air Force. In January 1946, General of the Army Eisenhower and Army Air Forces General Spaatz agreed on an Air Force organization of seven major commands, including the Air Technical Service Command. ATSC centers were also renamed. For example, San Antonio Air Technical Services Command at Kelly Air Force Base in Texas became the San Antonio Air Materiel Area in 1946.

=== Air Materiel Command ===
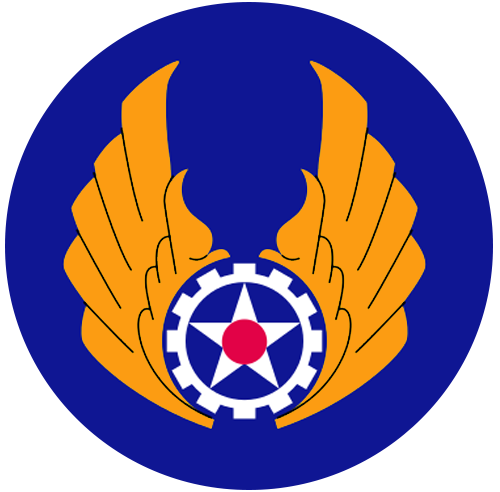
USAAF Materiel Command SSI

In 1946 AAF Technical Service Command was redesignated Air Materiel Command, and the air technical service commands were reorganized as Air Materiel Areas:

- Marianas Air Materiel Area (Harmon Field, Guam)(active as Provisional formation by 17 August 1948; active 1 February 1949) Under the command of the 19th Bombardment Wing from August 1948 to October 1949.
- Middletown Air Materiel Area (Middletown, Pennsylvania)
- Mobile Air Materiel Area (Brookley Air Force Base, Mobile, Alabama)
- Ogden Air Materiel Area (Hill Field, Utah)
- Oklahoma City Air Materiel Area (Tinker Field, Oklahoma)
- Philippine Air Materiel Area (Nichols Field)
- Rome Air Materiel Area (Rome, New York) (1 February 1943 – 25 June 1947)
- Sacramento Air Materiel Area (Sacramento, California)
- San Antonio Air Materiel Area (San Antonio, Texas)
- San Bernardino Air Materiel Area (1949–66), at Norton Field, California
- Warner Robins Air Materiel Area (1951–61) at Robins AFB and redesignated Warner Robins Air Logistics Center

Two further Air Materiel Areas were established in the late 1940s and early 1950s:

- Japan Air Materiel Area (JAMA, 1947–1949), at Tachikawa Air Base, replaced by the Far East Air Materiel Command (FEAMCOM)
- Central Air Materiel Area, Europe (CAMAE, 1956–67), at Chateauroux Air Depot in France

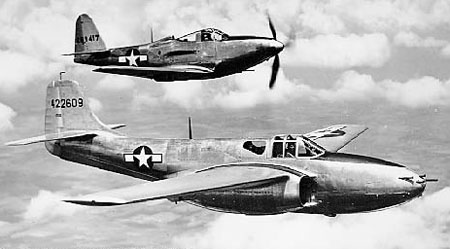
Bell P-59A (S/N 44-22609, the first United States jet fighter) and a P-63 Kingcobra in flight, 1944

Leaders of the Army Air Forces (AAF) were alarmed by many of the new weapons that would revolutionize air warfare which had emerged from foreign laboratories. Radar, jet aircraft (Messerschmitt Me 262, Fieseler Fi 103 (V-1 flying bomb)) and ballistic missiles (V-2 rocket) had all either originated or been perfected outside the United States. Congress greatly increased funds for R&D. Subsequently, the engineering function resided in the Materiel Command, the AAF Technical Service Command, the Air Technical Service Command, and the Air Materiel Command.

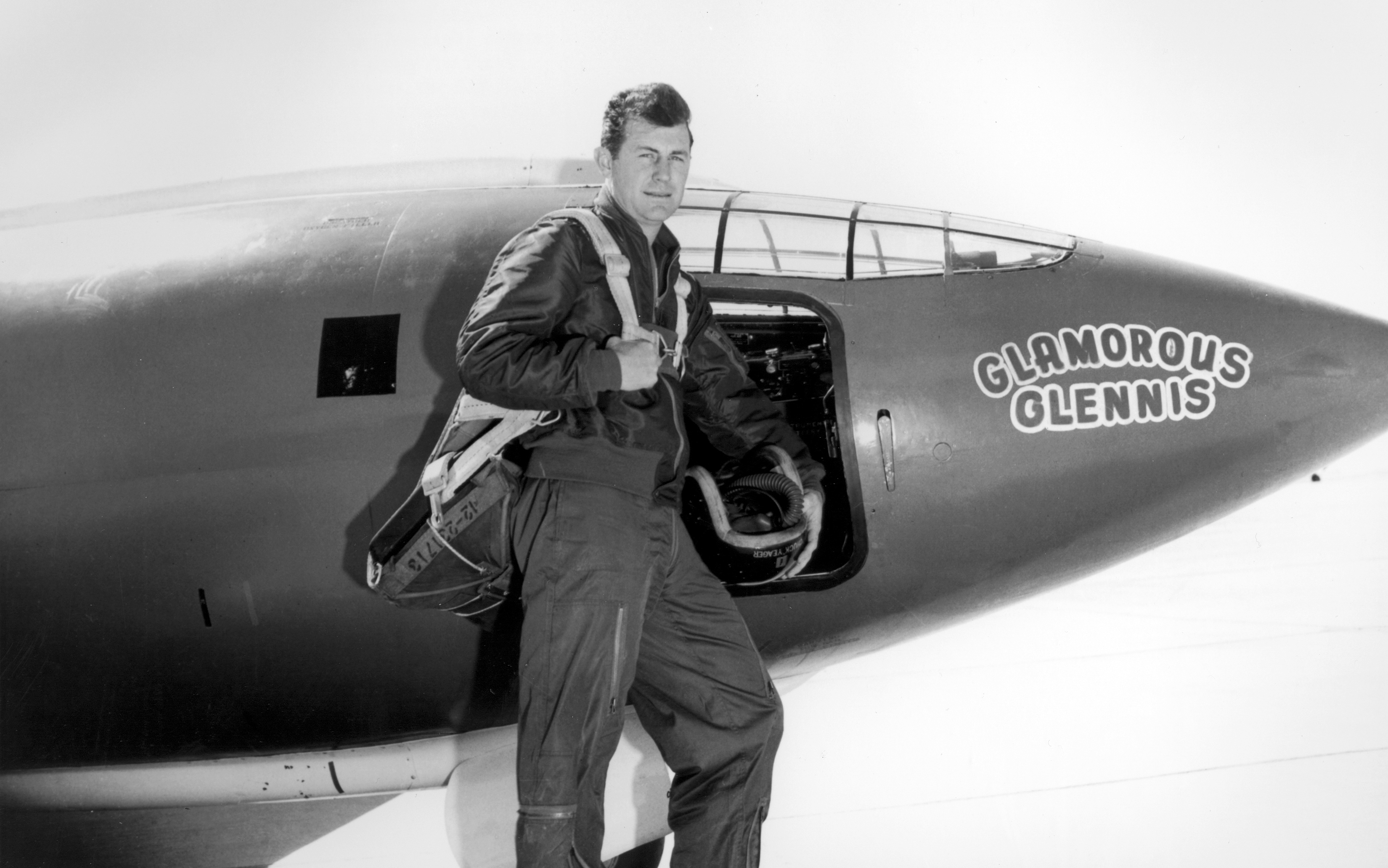
Chuck Yeager next to experimental aircraft Bell X-1 No. 1 Glamorous Glennis, 1947

The functions of research and development and logistics were operated separately during World War II until they were reunited for several years in the late 1940s under Air Materiel Command. Among its forces was the Air Materiel Force, European Area, which was transferred from USAFE in on 1 January 1956. Air Materiel Force, European Area, at Chateauroux Air Depot, France, and Air Materiel Force, Pacific Area, at Tachikawa Air Base, Japan, were of Numbered Air Force status. Often these formations supervised Air Depot Wings, for example the 75th Air Depot Wing which was based at Chinhae Air Base in South Korea during the Korean War.

In 1950, research and development were split off into a separate formation, the Air Research and Development Command. From the early 1950s to 1962, the 3079th Aviation Depot Wing under AMC, headquartered at Wright-Patterson Air Force Base, Ohio, was a weapons of mass destruction unit of key strategic importance. It was active until 1962.

In 1961, Air Materiel Command became the Air Force Logistics Command, while the Air Research and Development Command gained responsibility for weapon system acquisition and was renamed the Air Force Systems Command.

== Lineage ==
- Established as Army Air Forces Materiel and Services on 14 July 1944

Organized as a major command on 17 July 1944
Redesignated: Army Air Forces Technical Service Command on 31 August 1944
Redesignated: Air Technical Service Command on 1 July 1945
Redesignated: Air Materiel Command on 9 March 1946
Redesignated: Air Force Logistics Command on 1 April 1961
Inactivated on 1 July 1992

=== Components ===
Included 22 Air Depot Group, Patterson Field, OH, 19 Jan 1942, before reassigned to Oklahoma City Air Depot Control Area, 8 Aug 1942.

== See also ==
- Cheli Air Force Station
