= Tachikawa Airfield =

Airfield in Tachikawa, Tokyo, Japan

Tachikawa Airfield 立川飛行場
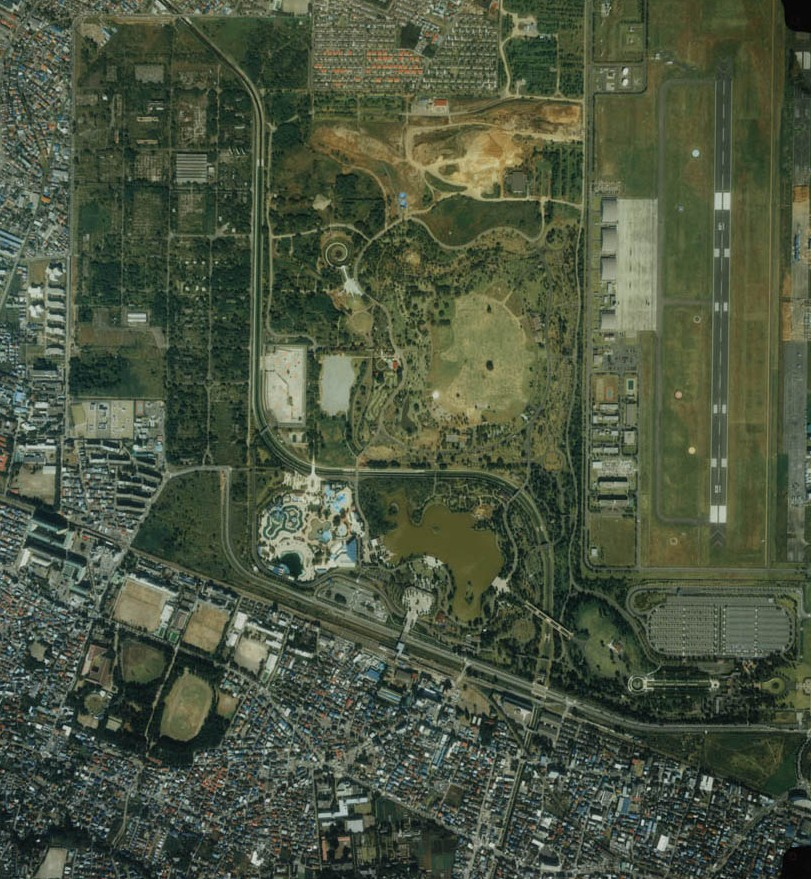
- Aerial photograph (1989)
- IATA: none; ICAO: RJTC

Summary
- Airport type: Military
- Owner/Operator: Japan Ground Self-Defense Force
- Location: Tachikawa, Tokyo, Japan
- Opened: March 14, 1922; 104 years ago
- Elevation AMSL: 313 ft (95 m)
- Coordinates: 35°42′39″N 139°24′11″E

Map
- Location in Japan

Runways
Direction	Length		Surface
Direction	m	ft	Surface
01/19	900	2,953	Asphalt concrete
- Source: Japanese AIP at AIS Japan

Tachikawa Airfield (立川飛行場, Tachikawa Hikōjō) (ICAO: RJTC) is an airfield in the city of Tachikawa, in the western part of Tokyo, Japan. Currently under the administration of the Ministry of Defense, it has also served as a civilian airport with Japan's first scheduled air service.

== History ==
Tachikawa Airfield was built by the Imperial Guard to protect Tokyo, and first operated in 1922, for military aircraft only. In 1929, Japan's first commercial air service began with a flight from Tachikawa Airfield to Osaka. Civil aviation moved to what is now Haneda Airport in 1933, returning the airfield to military use only. The airfield was heavily damaged in the 1945 Tokyo bombing campaign, and became an American air base after World War II. In 1977, control of Tachikawa Airfield was returned to the Japanese government. Part of the land was redeveloped into Shōwa Memorial Park in 1983.

=== Origins ===
Tachikawa was originally built at the direction of the Imperial Guard for the purpose of providing aerial defense for Tokyo. The Guard also considered sites in Sagamihara, Kawagoe and Kodaira, but chose Tachikawa for its proximity to central Tokyo, good rail connection (today's Chuo Main Line) and favorable geography (flat land with few residents).

Tachikawa Airfield's origins begin on 14 March 1922 when a flying squadron of Farman III aircraft, one balloon squadron and a material depot unit moved to Tachikawa from Tokorozawa, Saitama Prefecture. This small group was commanded by a Colonel Arikawa, Engineering Corps and the flying squadron commander was Captain Yoshitoshi Tokugawa.

Civil aviation from the airfield commenced in 1929 with the inauguration of the scheduled commercial service by Japan Air Transport to Osaka. Japan's first scheduled air service linked Tokyo and Osaka with a three-hour flight. The airport also had scheduled flights to Dalian (Zhoushuizi Airport) and Seoul (Yeouido Airport). The operations continued until 1933, when it transferred to Tokyo Airfield, now Haneda Airport.

Tachikawa's next component was formed in November 1933 when the Ishikawajima Aircraft Manufacturing Company (石川島飛行機製作所, Ishikawajima Hikōki Seisakushō) moved to the airfield. Six years later it was renamed the Tachikawa Aircraft Company Ltd. In addition, Hitachi, and Showa Aircraft Industry built plants in the vicinity.

With the departure of civil aviation in 1933, Tachikawa returned to being an Army airfield. Its warplanes were transferred to a base in Kashiwa in the northwestern corner of Chiba Prefecture in 1939.

In 1937, two pilots, Masaaki Iinuma and Kenji Tsukagoshi departed Tachikawa with a Mitsubishi Ki-15, heading for London. Their mission was to congratulate King George VI on his coronation. The aircraft was named the Kamikaze.

During the late 1930s and throughout World War II, Tachikawa Aircraft employed growing numbers of workers, it produced more than 6,000 aircraft. It produced fighters, troop carriers, and bombers. Prototypes were designed and developed at the manufacturing plant. The Imperial Japanese Army built technical schools at Tachikawa, one of which was the Tokorozawa Army Aviation Maintenance School, established in 1935. The school was moved to Tachikawa in April 1939 when the Imperial Japanese Army Air Force Fifth Air Wing moved to the airfield. Cross-trainees, college graduates and Air Academy graduates went to this school to become aviation technical maintenance officers. It also co-existed with the Fourth Aviation Training Unit which provided basic training for Japanese Army Air Force flyers.

Near the end of World War II, Tachikawa was subjected to intense bombing by B-29 Superfortresses from the 29th Bombardment Group of the United States Army Air Forces' XXI Bomber Command during April and June 1945. The Shintentai, an anti-aircraft kamikaze group, defended the airfield and its manufacturing facilities, however most of the airfield was rendered unserviceable by the bombing raids, along with most of the structures and support facilities of the airfield by the time the first United States Army forces moved in on 5 September 1945.

=== United States military use ===
==== Postwar era ====
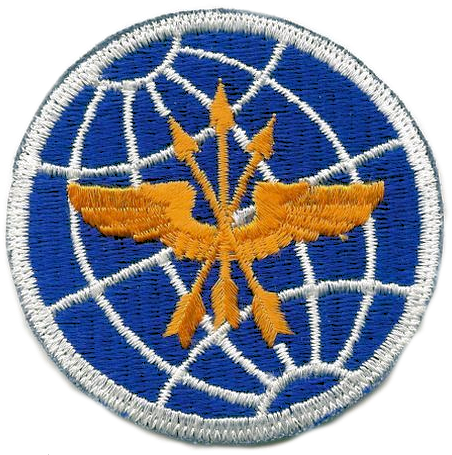
Emblem of the Military Air Transport Service

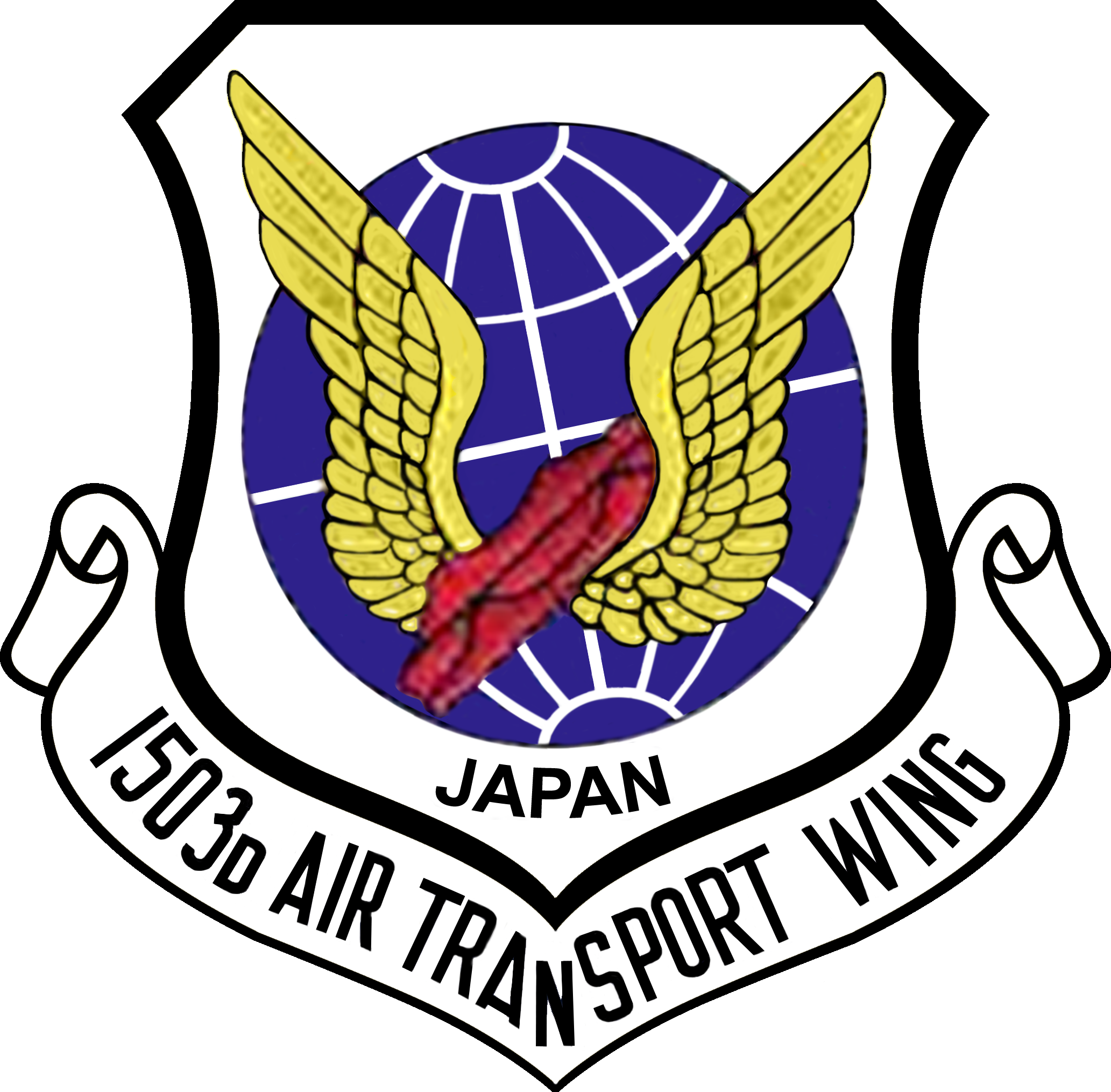
USAF 1503d Air Transport Wing emblem

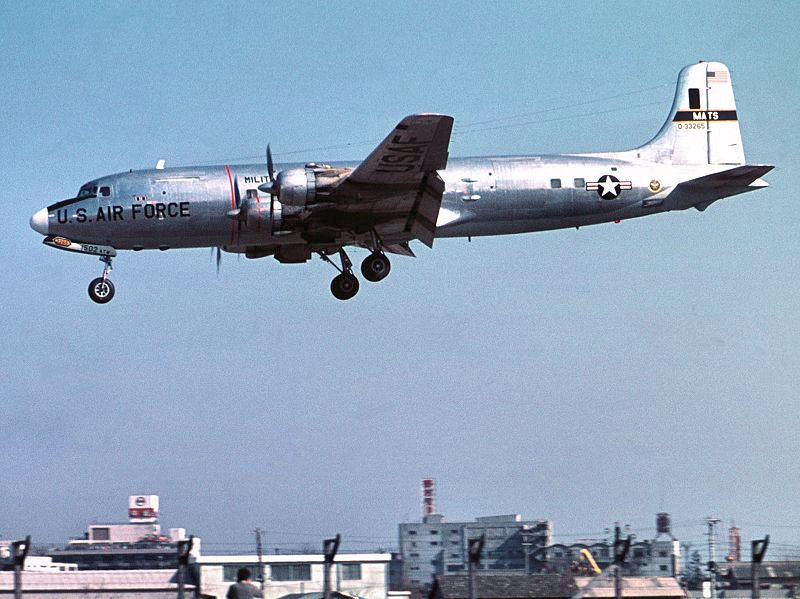
MATS C-118A Liftmaster, AF Ser. No. 53-3265

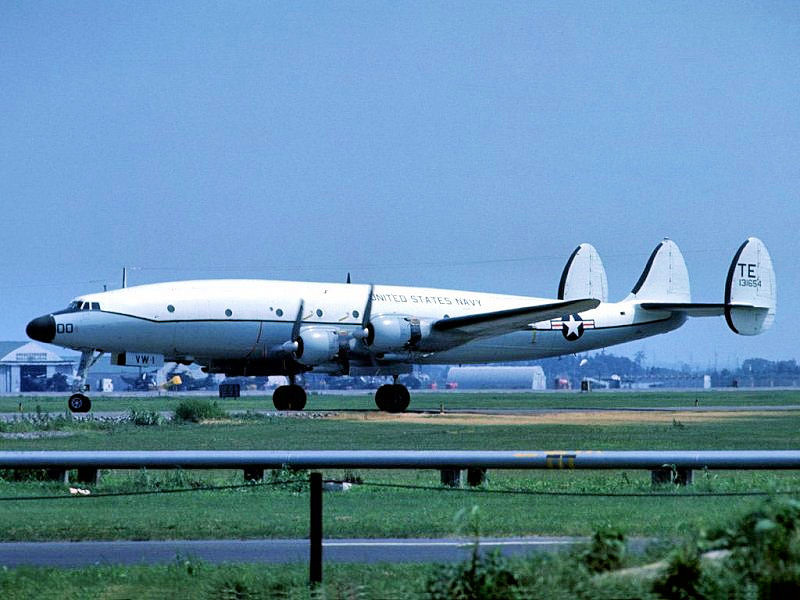
MATS Navy R7V-B1, BuNo 131654

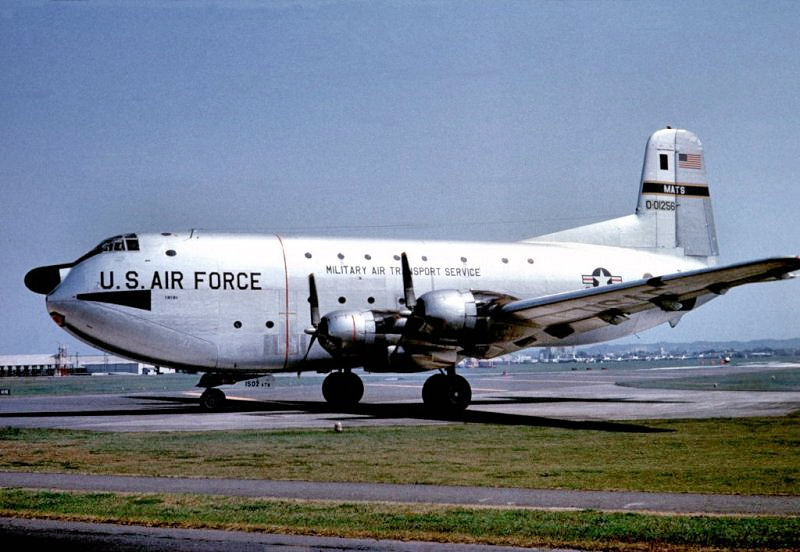
MATS C-124A Globemaster II, AF Ser. No. 50-1256

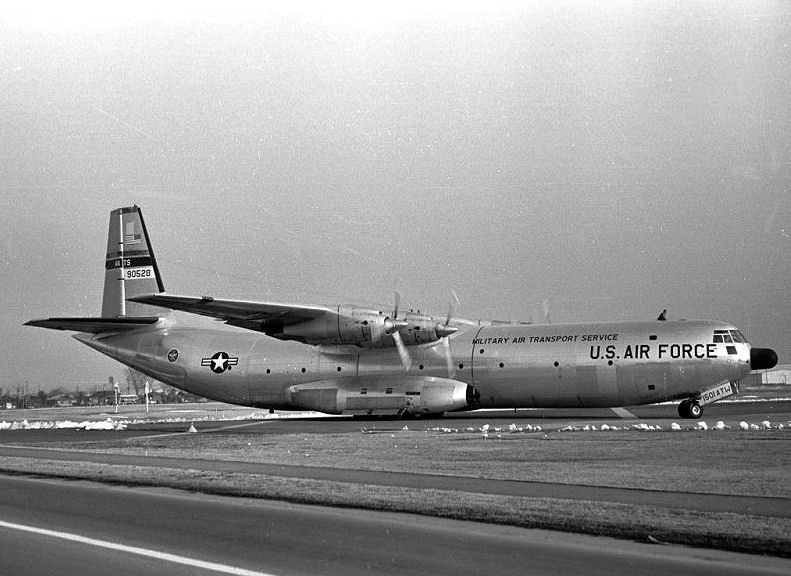
MATS C-133B Cargomaster, AF Ser. No. 59-0528

After the war, the United States occupied the base, with the airfield being in shambles. Given its proximity to Tokyo, Tachikawa Airfield was designated as a transport base, with a mission to provide transportation for priority passengers and cargo in and around the Tokyo Area; to support the Occupation Government in Japan, and provide strategic transport to the United States.

Air Transport Command (ATC) was given the assignment to get the airfield cleaned up and operational. ATC established the 1503d Army Air Force Base Unit (AAFBU) to manage the cargo and personnel operations at the airfield, and by 1 January 1946 the base was ready enough to permit C-47 Skytrain and C-46 Commando aircraft to operate from the base. Larger C-54 Skymasters began using the base by April 1946, and a day/night lighting system was installed and in operation by November 1946.

In 1947, Air Transport Command began to support the Seventh Air Force Service Command Japan Air Materiel Area (JAMA) at Tachikawa, which eventually became the major tenant unit at the base, and by 1948 was providing depot-level maintenance for aircraft in Far East Air Force and logistical support from Air Materiel Command. In July 1949, JAMA was redesignated Far East Air Materiel Command (FEAMCOM).

The western sector became Tachikawa Air Base, while FEAMCOM took the eastern part. They became a single base again in 1956. With the inactivation of Air Transport Command in 1948, Military Air Transport Service redesignated the 1503d AAFBU the 540th Air Transport Wing, later 1503d Air Transport Wing. The wing became the host organization at Tachikawa Air Base upon activation.

The 1503d ATW became the main MATS organization in the Western Pacific, supporting numerous tenant organizations such as the Air Rescue Service; Air Weather Service, and Far East Air Force theater Troop Carrier Groups (later Wings) which transshipped supplies and personnel from the MATS Aerial Port at Tachikawa throughout the 1950s. The first major mission by the 1503d was the evacuation of large numbers of Americans out of China in 1948 after the Communists defeated the Chinese Nationalist forces during the Chinese Civil War.

In addition to the MATS operations, Far East Air Force operated numerous Troop Carrier units from Tachikawa, providing theater airlift within the command flying C-46 and C-47 transports during the late 1940s under the 6000th Support Wing.

==== Korean War ====
The Korean War saw operations increase, with Troop Carrier units carrying out the evacuation of American civilians and then transporting the torrent of Allied military men and material flowing into the war zone. Around the clock, planes arrived and departed. A typical flight might carry 35,000 pounds of hand grenades to South Korea, with 80 wounded personnel arriving to be transported to the USAF Hospital on the base. For thousands of servicemen whose tours took them into, through or out of Tachikawa, the USAF hospital became the best barometer of American military activities in the Far East.

==== Cold War ====
After the Korean War, the Far East Air Force 6100th SW became the host unit at Tachikawa in 1953, with MATS and Air Materiel Command becoming tenant organizations. MATS flights arrived and departed 24 hours a day operating C-118, C-121, C-124 and C-133 from Hickam Field, Hawaii or being staged through Alaska. From Tachikawa, outbound MATS flights headed to Clark Air Base heading to Saigon, Bangkok, and on to Karachi Airport, Pakistan or to Guam, Wake or Midway Island in the Central Pacific Region.

In the Tachikawa air disaster on June 18, 1953 a U.S. Air Force Douglas C-124 Globemaster II transport experienced an engine failure after takeoff and crashed into a field near the base. The accident claimed the lives of 129 people, and was the deadliest air disaster in history at the time.

With a runway only 1,500 m (4,900 ft) long, Tachikawa was not adequate for the largest aircraft, and the U.S. decided to extend the runway into the neighboring town of Sunagawa (now part of the city of Tachikawa). The July 8, 1957, Sunagawa Riots (also known as the "Sunagawa Struggle") resulted in cancellation of the plan, although this wasn't announced until the winter of 1968.

As United States military forces began to increase in Indochina, more and more equipment moved into first Tan Son Nhut Air Base in South Vietnam, then to Don Muang Royal Thai Air Force Base, near Bangkok, and in early 1965 to the huge new Cam Ranh Air Base with the jet C-141 Starlifter transports.

In 1964, operations from Tachikawa began to phase down as its location in the urban area of Tokyo made heavy transport operations undesirable. In addition, Tachikawa's short runway made jet transport operations difficult. As a result, the Air Force chose to develop nearby Tama Airfield (the present-day Yokota Air Base) with more and more heavy transport operations going there.

The 1503d was reduced to Group Level, and operations at Tachikawa focused more on Aeromedical Transport operations from the Philippines, and supporting MATS units at deployed locations in the Pacific. C-130E troop carrier units from Pacific Air Forces continued to operate from the airfield. With the inactivation of the Military Air Transport Service in 1966, the aerial port facilities were turned over to the Pacific Air Forces 6100th Support Wing (formerly 6000th), which had taken over base support duties from the 1503d ATW in 1953. Military Airlift Command operations were reassigned to Yokota Air Base.

In the late 1960s, more and more transport operations were shifted to Yokota, and by 1969 the use of the airfield ended with the exception of light aircraft use. On 3 October 1969, Fifth Air Force announced that the flight activity at Tachikawa would be halted until the end of the year. During the 1970s, Tachikawa's mission changed to being a support base, primarily USAF military housing for Tokyo, and the large USAF hospital remained.

On 23 January 1973, the Kanto Plain Consolidation Plan (KPCP) was endorsed by the 14th U.S.-Japan Security Consultative Committee, both the U.S. and Japanese Government agreed to return of Tachikawa Air Base. KPCP was a primary Fifth Air Force program which consolidates major USAF activities at five facilities in the Kanto Plain (Tachikawa, Fuchu Air Station, South Camp Drake, Kanto-Mura Dependent Housing Area, and Johnson Housing Annex) into Yokota Air Base. Following the completion of the USFJ Facilities and Areas Adjustment Program (1968 to 1971), the plan was developed through the U.S.-Japan Joint Committee and its Facilities Subcommittee. As the first implementation of the KPCP, Yamato Air Station (Tachikawa AB school annex and unaccompanied personnel dormitory area) was returned to the Japanese Government on 30 June 1973.

After the end of the Vietnam War in 1975, plans were made to close Tachikawa for budgetary reasons. The base was officially closed on 30 September 1977 (Special Order GA-45, Headquarters, Pacific Air Forces, 27 September 1977); on 30 November 1977, Tachikawa Air Base was formally returned to the Japanese government.

==== Major USAF units assigned ====
- Japan Air Materiel Area (FEAF), c. 1946

Far East Air Materiel Command (FEAF), 1 Jul 1949
Far East Air Logistics Force (AMC), 1 Jul 1952
Air Materiel Force, Pacific Area (AMC/AFLC), 1 Oct 1955 - 1 Jun 1957; 1 Apr 1960 - 1 Jul 1962
Northern Air Materiel Area, Pacific (AMC), 1 June 1957 - 1 April 1960

- 13th Supply Group, Depot (the old 13th Air Depot Gp of WWII), bef. Jul 1949 - 1 Feb 1952, when redes. as:

6400th Air Depot Wing, 1 Feb 1952 - c. 1 Oct 1955
6400th Maintenance & Supply Group, 1 Feb 1952 - ____
13th Air Base Group, bef. 1 Feb 1952, when redesignated as:
6400th Air Base Group, 1 Feb 1952 - ____

- 6401st Ammunition Supply Group (Depot), 1 Dec 1954 (stationed at FEAMCOM AB)^{A}

2714th Ammunition Supply Group (Depot), 1 Oct 1955 - 1 Jun 1956.

- 315th Air Division (Combat Cargo), 24 Apr 1954

315th Air Division, 1 Aug 1967 - 15 Apr 1969

- 54th Troop Carrier Wing, Sep 1945 - 25 Jan 1946
- 71st Reconnaissance Group, 25 Oct 1945 - 15 Jan 1946
- 433d Troop Carrier Group, 11 Sep 1945 - 15 Jan 1946
- 375th Troop Carrier Group, Sep 1945 - 25 Mar 1946
- 317th Troop Carrier Group, 15 Jan 1946 - 21 Sep 1948

317th Troop Carrier Wing, 18 Aug - 2 Dec 1948

- 374th Troop Carrier Group, 5 Mar 1949 - 18 Nov 1958

374th Troop Carrier Wing, 5 Mar 1949 - 1 Jul 1957

- 61st Troop Carrier Group, 26 Mar - 18 Nov 1952
- 1503d Air Transport Wing (Heavy) (MATS), 15 Jul 1957^{B}

1503d Air Transport Group, 22 Jun 1964 - 8 Jan 1966

- 65th Military Airlift Group (MAC), 8 Jan 1966 - 14 Aug 1967
- 13th Medical Group
- 376th Station Hospital (US Army), 1945 - 1953 (redesignated or succeeded by:)
- 6407th USAF Hospital (later simply USAF Hospital, Tachikawa), 1 Jul 1953 – 1 Apr 1976^{C}
- 374th Medical Group (USAF), 5 Mar 1949 - 25 Jul 1958 (was redes. 374th Tactical Hosp. 8 Mar 1954)
- 2710th Air Base Wing, c. 1956

6000th Operations Squadron
6100th Air Base Wing, 1 Jan 1961
6100th Support Wing, 1 Jul 1961 - 31 Jul 1970^{D}

- Under the control of:

347th Tactical Fighter Wing (Yokota AB), 1 Jul 1970
6100th Air Base Wing, Provisional (Yokota AB), 15 May 1971^{E}
475th Air Base Wing (Yokota AB), 1 Nov 1971 - 31 Aug 1977

2712 Communications Maintenance Squadron (FEAMCOM)

A.The eastern portions of Tachikawa AB were redesignated as "JAMA Army Air Base" on 27 Feb 1947. It was redesignated as "FEAMCOM Air Base" on 1 Jul 1949, and was consolidated again with the western portion of Tachikawa AB on 1 Jan 1956.
B.1503d ATW was moved from Haneda AB to Tachikawa AB on 15 Jul 1957.
C.Consolidated with 347th USAF Dispensary, Yokota AB.
D.The 6000th Support Wing (Fuchu AS, Tokyo) and the 6100th Air Base Wing combined to form the 6100th Support Wing.
E.The 6100th Air Base Wing reactivated at Yokota AB as provisional status, replacing the 347th TFW.

=== Japanese use ===
The Japanese government put the land to a variety of uses. The Japan Ground Self-Defense Force (GSDF) established a base there, as did the Japan Coast Guard, the Tokyo Metropolitan Police Department and the Tokyo Fire Department.

Consolidation resulted in the establishment of the Tachikawa Disaster-Preparedness Base. Part of the land has been redeveloped as Fare Tachikawa. The central part of Tachikawa Airfield is now Showa Memorial Park, a spacious facility named in memory of Hirohito, known formally as Emperor Shōwa. It opened in 1983. Tachikawa's city hall and an IKEA store also occupy parts of the footprint of the former base.

=== Air show ===
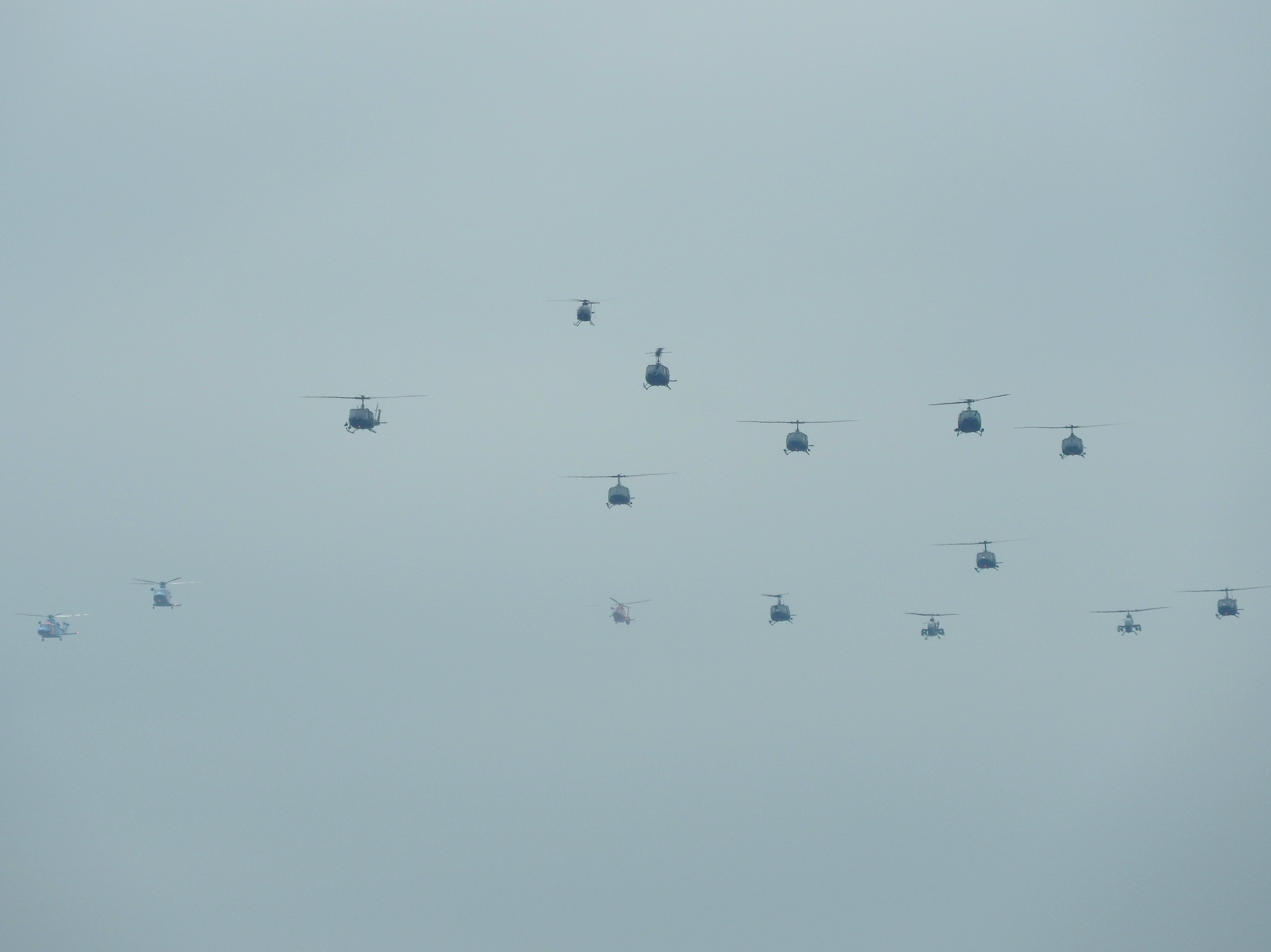
Mass helicopter formation at the 2016 Tachikawa Air Show

The Tachikawa air show takes place late each year. It features displays of helicopters from the GSDF, Tokyo Police Department and Tokyo Fire Department. Aircraft from the US Air Force have also appeared.

== Operations ==
Currently the Japan Ground Self-Defense Force's Camp Tachikawa occupies the western portion of the airfield. The main unit there is the GSDF Eastern Army Aviation Group. It operates helicopters, and also commands the anti-tank helicopter units at Camp Kisarazu. Equipment at Tachikawa includes the UH-1J Iroquois, and the Kawasaki OH-6D and OH-1.

The Tachikawa Disaster-Preparedness Base sits on 115 ha (280 acres) of land. In addition to the airfield, it includes emergency medical-treatment facilities and stores of emergency supplies. Agencies with a presence at Tachikawa include the Cabinet Office, Ministry of Land, Infrastructure and Transport, Japan Coast Guard, Ministry of Agriculture, Forestry and Fisheries, Tokyo Metropolitan Government, Tokyo Metropolitan Police and Fire departments, National Hospital Organization (an Independent Administrative Institution), and Red Cross.

Also in Tachikawa are Camp Higashi-Tachikawa of the Ground Self-Defense Force and the Tachikawa Depot of the Japan Air Self-Defense Force. It is roughly southeast of Yokota Air Base.

The alternate center for Japan's national government is located on a portion of what used to be Tachikawa Air Base. The center includes billeting, offices, communications and control centers, hospital and a full cafeteria. The center is for the national government to use if forced to relocate or as a command center to direct a response to a significant national disaster or emergency.

Japan's National Emergency Response Center is located in a complex of underground bunkers and tunnels that were developed for the Japanese military for use during World War II to hide and protect airplanes from the US bombings. These tunnels were taken over by the US Military and used for storage while the base was in operation from 1945 to 1977, when the base was given back to the Japanese Government as well as the disposition of the bunker complex. The underground complex is located under what was the west Tachikawa Air Base housing, Military Barracks complex and the runway area. From November 1977 to present day the tunnel and bunker system have been enlarged to accommodate up to 5,000 people and to sustain them for a period of one year if necessary.
