= Piano Concerto No. 3 (Ohzawa) =

Composition by Hisato Ohzawa

The Piano Concerto No. 3 in A♭ major is a piano concerto composed by Japanese composer Hisato Ohzawa. This work is subtitled Kamikaze after the aircraft Kamikaze, and was premiered under the baton of the composer on June 24, 1938, by the Takarazuka Symphony Orchestra, with Maxim Shapiro at the piano.

Contrary to potential inference based on the approximate era of composition, the name "Kamikaze" is not related to the suicide attack Kamikaze employed by the Empire of Japan during World War II.

This work was not successful partly because the progressive style of Ohzawa was beyond the comprehension of audiences of those days. Although the recording was broadcast on radio after the premiere, this concerto, quite demanding for both performer and audience, was not performed again for a long time. The composer's family published the score of this work on their own after his death.

== Structure ==
The work consists of three traditional movements. Although the concerto is marked as A♭, but he treated the tonality considerably freely.

The first movement, allegro assai, begins with the declaration, by trombones and strings, of "motto for whole work", three notes; A♭, E♭ and F, which later appear as the fundamental elements of this work written in sonata form. First subject is gathered motives which remind the audiences of the aircraft flying through the clouds. The second subject is the melody savage as well as brilliant. Throughout the development, the music never fails to recall the sky journey. In the short coda, long tone of piccolo sounds as the aircraft flying away.

The beginning of the G major second movement, andante cantabile, by saxophone is notable and the movement is jazzy rather than classical. Ohzawa utilized pentatonic scale in light of similarity to blues, consequently the music succeeds in displaying delicate oriental mood even in jazzy atmosphere. This is induced from "motto" exhibited in the first movement. The movement of ternary form ends by melting into dream.

The third movement, allegro moderato, is the finale with introduction, rondo of scherzando rhythm and coda. Wood winds also play toccata in this movement. The sudden invasion of cabaret-like tune obviously suggests the approaching of aircraft to its destination. The cadenza of soloist is followed by recapitulation of the main subject. Restless coda representing the sound of engine by strings leads the unexpectedly sudden finish of the concerto. The pianistic virtuosity and the modern style of the composer peak in this movement.

== Recording ==
- Ekaterina Saranceva (Piano), Dmitry Yablonsky (conductor), Russian Philharmonic Orchestra Naxos 8.557416J
