= Masaaki Iinuma =

Japanese aviator

Masaki Iinuma
- 飯沼 壮貴
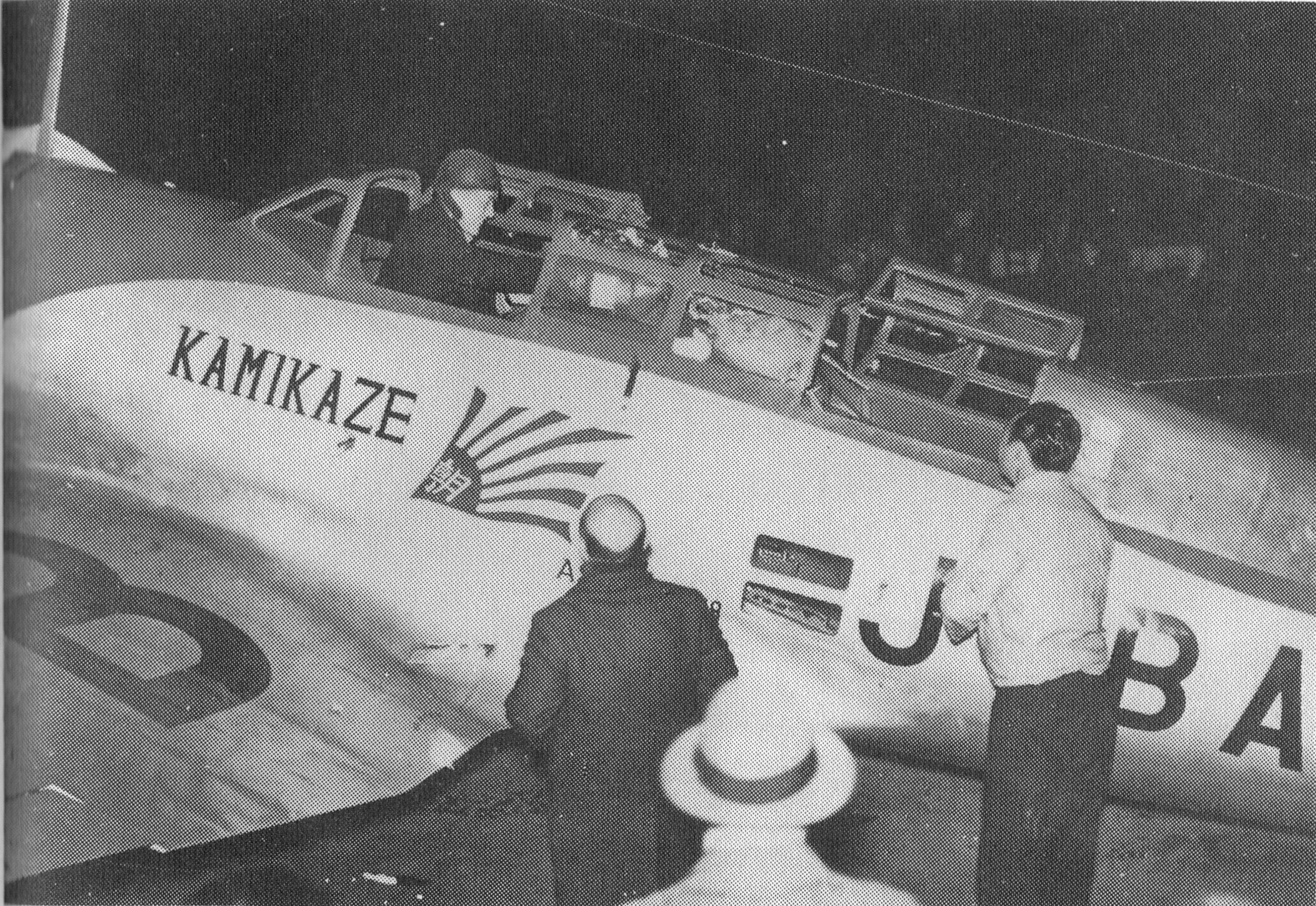
- Born: 27 November 1912; Toyoshina, Nagano, Empire of Japan
- Died: December 1941 (aged 29); Phnom Penh, French Indochina
- Occupation: Aviator
- Military career
- Allegiance: Empire of Japan
- Branch: Imperial Japanese Army
- Known for: Flying the first Japanese built aircraft from Japan to Europe

Masaki Iinuma (飯沼 壮貴, Iinuma Masaki; 27 November 1912 – December 1941) was a Japanese aviator.

Iinuma was born in Toyoshina (now part of Azumino, Nagano Prefecture), and was a graduate of the Imperial Japanese Army flying school at Tokorozawa.

At age 24 he gained fame as the pilot on the Kamikaze (神風号, Kamikaze-go), a Mitsubishi Ki-15 Karigane aircraft, (registration J-BAAI) sponsored by the newspaper Asahi Shimbun. It became famous on April 9, 1937, as the first Japanese-built aircraft to fly from Japan to Europe, making the flight between Tokyo and London, in time for the coronation of King George VI and Queen Elizabeth. The total elapsed time from departure from the Tachikawa Airfield was 94 hours, 17 minutes and 56 seconds, with actual flight time for the whole distance of 15,357 kilometres (9,542 mi) was 51 hours, 19 minutes and 23 seconds. The crew consisted of pilot Iinuma and navigator Kenji Tsukagoshi. The flight was the first Fédération Aéronautique Internationale record won by Japanese aviators.

Iinuma later served as chief test pilot for the Kayaba Ka-1 autogyro from May 1941. Iinuma was killed in December 1941 at Phnom Penh airfield in French Indochina when, in a daze from hearing the news of the attack on Pearl Harbor by Japanese forces, he accidentally walked into a spinning aircraft propeller. His death was officially reported as a military casualty.
