= Hisato Ohzawa =

Japanese composer (1907–1953)

- 大澤壽人
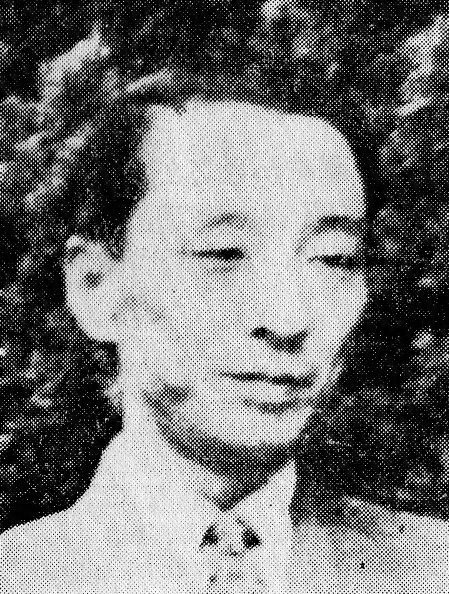
- Born: August 1, 1907; Kobe, Hyogo Prefecture, Empire of Japan
- Died: October 28, 1953 (aged 46); Tokyo, Japan
- Occupation: composer

Hisato Ohzawa (大澤壽人, Ōzawa Hisato) (August 1, 1907—October 28, 1953) was a Japanese composer and conductor. Renewed interest in his work reflects the view that he was one of the preeminent Japanese composers of his day.

== Biography ==
One of the foremost Japanese composers of the first half of the twentieth century, he grew up in Kobe, studying piano, organ and choral singing. He moved to the United States in 1930 to study composition with Frederick Converse and Carl McKinley at Boston University and the New England Conservatory of Music, also taking some lessons with Arnold Schoenberg. It was in America that his early works were composed: The Little Symphony (1932), his First Piano Concerto, his First Symphony, and a Double Bass Concerto (dedicated to Koussevitzky). He was the first Japanese musician who conducted Boston Symphony Orchestra. In 1934 he moved to Paris and continued his studies, composing his Second Symphony and his Second Piano Concerto.

He returned to Japan in 1936, where his works were met with mixed reactions, being technically too difficult for Japanese orchestras of the time, and being in a fairly modern style. Due to the increasing international tension of the time, he was less and less able to travel, struggling to make a living as a composer. The Third Symphony (named "The Symphony of the Founding of Japan" and dedicated to the then-current Emperor, Hirohito) was composed in 1936, with the Third Piano Concerto following in 1938 (named "Kamikaze," after the popular civil aircraft, sponsored by the Asahi Newspaper). In 1940 he wrote two cantatas to celebrate the 2600th year of the Emperor. He also wrote musicals and film music.

After the Second World War, Ohzawa taught at the Kobe College (Kobe Jogakuin Daigaku 神戸女学院大学). He composed light music, jazzy concertos for saxophone and trumpet, created an orchestra, and hosted his own radio show featuring the orchestra, which featured popular classics, as well as more modern works by such composers as Igor Stravinsky, Arnold Schoenberg and Dmitri Shostakovich. He aimed to write a Fourth Symphony, but was stopped by his death, leaving only the title page.

== Works ==
- Piano Trio in D minor (1932)
- Cello Sonata in G minor (1932)
- Sinfonietta (1932)
- Sonatine in E Minor, for piano (1933)
- Piano Quintet in C minor (1933)
- String Quartet in A minor (1933)
- Piano Concerto No. 1 in A minor (1933)
- Six Capriccietti, for piano (1934)
- Les Petis Dessins, for piano (1934)
- Three Pastoral Movements "Sons of the Earth", for orchestra (1934)
- Symphony No. 1 (1934)
- Double Bass Concerto (1934) - dedicated to Sergei Koussevitzky
- Symphony No. 2 (1934)
- Piano Concerto No. 2 (1935)
- Trio for oboe, clarinet and bassoon (1935)
- Les fragments de la ruelle, for orchestra (1935)
- Petite messe, pour chœur et orchestre (1935)
- Violin Concertino "To a Chinese Poem" (1936)
- Symphony No. 3 (1937)
- Trois morceaux de primtemps "Teichu", for piano (1937)
- Piano Concerto No. 3 "Kamikaze" (1938)
- Dawn of the Sea, cantata (1940)
- Festive Music for the Nation, cantata (1940)
- Sakura Fantasy for piano and orchestra (1946)
- Saxophone Concerto (1947)
- Pegasus Rhapsody for saxophone, piano, and orchestra (1949)
- Trumpet Concerto (1950)
- Festive Music Celebrating One Thousand Two Hundredth Year of the Great Buddha (1952)

== Recordings ==
Naxos Records' "Japanese Classics" series released two discs of his music: one containing the Piano Concerto No. 3 and Symphony No. 3, another containing Piano Concerto No. 2 and Symphony No. 2.

In 2018 Nippon Columbia published a double CD, "The Art of Hisato Ohzawa" including the Double Bass Concerto (soloist Nakako Sano), the Piano Concerto No. 3 "Kamikaze" (soloist Kotaro Fukuma), and the Symphony No. 1, with the Japan Philharmonic Orchestra, conducted by Kazuki Yamada (Public concert at Suntory Hall on September 3, 2017).
