= Far East Air Materiel Command =

Far East Air Materiel Command (FEAMCOM) was a logistics and materiel command of the United States Air Force. Its most important operational role came during the Korean War of 1950–1953.

FEAMCOM was originally established as the Far East Air Service Command on 14 July 1944. It was activated on 18 August 1944 at Brisbane, Australia. It eventually moved its headquarters to Manila on 7 August 1945 having re-located through several intermediate locations.

It was redesignated Pacific Air Service Command, U.S. Army, in January 1946, and supervised the 54th Troop Carrier Wing from 15 January – 31 May 1946.

It was then redesignated the Far East Air Materiel Command on 1 January 1947 at Fuchu Air Station, Japan.

At Tachikawa Air Base in Japan after being activated as FEAMCOM, it supervised the Japan Air Materiel Area, a logistics depot, at the same base. In July 1949, FEAMCOM was moved again to Tachikawa Air Base. It operated six installations at Tama, Yanada, Iwahara, Kisarazu, and Iwo Jima. The 13th Air Depot Wing and FEAMCOM were consolidated into one organization on 1 November 1949. From 1 February 1952, a command reorganization took effect. The 13th Group at FEAMCOM Air Base was inactivated, and the 6400th Depot Wing was activated. This left FEAMCOM with two depot wings (the 6400th and 6418th) in Japan, one depot wing (the 6208th) in the Philippines, and its headquarters in Japan.

FEAMCOM was the primary USAF logistical organization in the Pacific, with its final title as Air Materiel Force, Pacific Area, after transfer to Air Force Materiel Command. It was finally inactivated in 1962.

== Lineage ==
- Far East Air Service Command established, 14 July 1944
- Activated, 18 August 1944
- Redesignated Pacific Air Service Command, U.S. Army, Jan 1946
- Redesignated Far East Air Materiel Command, 1 Jan 1947
- Inactivated, 1 Feb 1952 but immediately organized on same day
- Redesignated Far East Air Logistics Force, 1 Jul 1952
- Redesignated Air Materiel Force, Pacific Area, 1 Oct 1955
- Discontinued and inactivated, 1 Jul 1962
