= Kenji Tsukagoshi =

Japanese aviator (1900–1943)

- 塚越 賢爾
- Born: 1900; Takasaki, Gunma, Japan
- Died: 1943 (aged 42–43); Indian Ocean
- Occupations: Aviator and explorer
- Known for: Navigator for the first Japanese-built aircraft to fly from Japan to Europe

Kenji Tsukagoshi (塚越 賢爾, Tsukagoshi Kenji; 1900–1943) was a Japanese aviator and explorer. He was navigator on the first Japanese-built aircraft to fly from Japan to Europe.

== Life ==
Tsukagoshi was born in Takasaki, Gunma Prefecture. His father was Japanese and his mother was British. He gained fame as the navigator on the Kamikaze (神風号, Kamikaze-go), a Mitsubishi Ki-15 Karigane aircraft, (registration J-BAAI) sponsored by the newspaper Asahi Shimbun. It became famous on April 9, 1937, as the first Japanese-built aircraft to fly from Japan to Europe. The flight from Tokyo to London took 51 hours, 17 minutes and 23 seconds and was piloted by Masaaki Iinuma (1912–1941).

The total elapsed time since departure from the Tachikawa Airfield was 94 hours, 17 minutes and 56 seconds, with actual flight time for the whole distance of 15,357 km of was 51 hours, 19 minutes and 23 seconds. The flight was the first Fédération Aéronautique Internationale record to have been won by Japanese aviators.

Tsukagoshi disappeared over the Indian Ocean after departing from Singapore for Crimea in the prototype Tachikawa Ki-77.

== See also ==
- List of people who disappeared mysteriously at sea
