= 14th Bombardment Squadron =

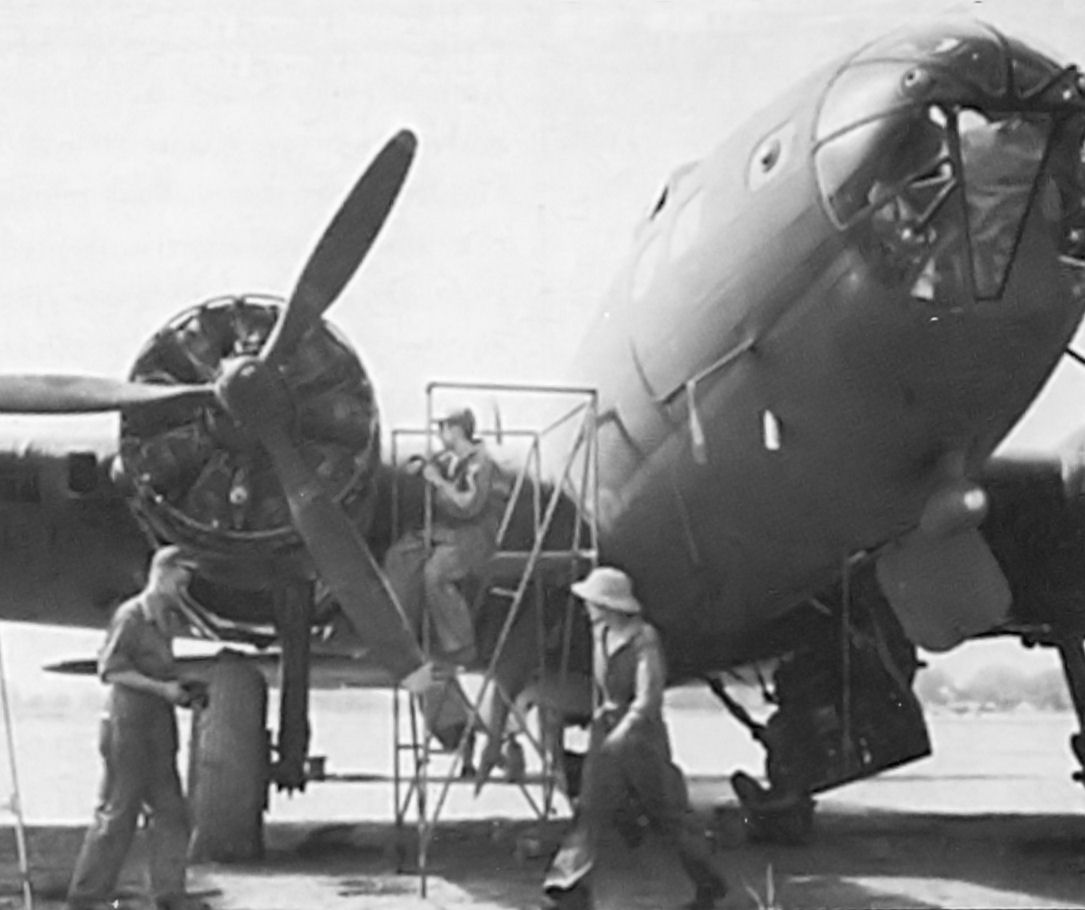
- 14th Bombardment Squadron B-17E, Clark Field, Philippines before the 8 December 1941 attack
- Active: 1917–1918; 1928-1946 (Not equipped or manned, May 1942 – 2 April 1946)
- Country: United States
- Branch: United States Air Force
- Role: Bombardment
- Engagements: World War II; Battle of the Philippines
- Decorations: Distinguished Unit Citation; Philippine Presidential Unit Citation

Insignia
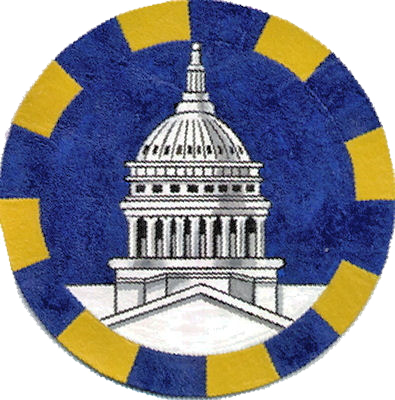
- 14th Bombardment Squadron emblem (Note: Approved 10 May 1933. Description: On a hurt the dome of the United States Capitol argent within a border of sixteen segments alternating azure and or.)

The 14th Bombardment Squadron was a squadron of the United States Army Air Forces. The squadron fought in the Battle of the Philippines (1941–42), most of its aircraft being destroyed in combat against the Japanese. The survivors of the ground echelon fought as infantry during Battle of Bataan and after their surrender, were subjected to the Bataan Death March, although some did escape to Australia. The remainder of the air echelon fought in the Dutch East Indies campaign (1942) before being reassigned to other units. The squadron was never remanned or equipped. It was carried as an active unit until 2 April 1946.

== History ==
=== World War I ===
The first predecessor of the squadron was organized in May 1917 as the 1st Aviation School Squadron at Rockwell Field, California. Three months later, it was redesignated the 14th Aero Squadron, and in July 1918 as Squadron A, Rockwell Field. It operated as a flying training unit with Curtiss JN-4, Curtiss JN-6, and Thomas-Morse S-4 aircraft until it was demobilized in November 1918 following the end of World War I.

=== Interwar period ===
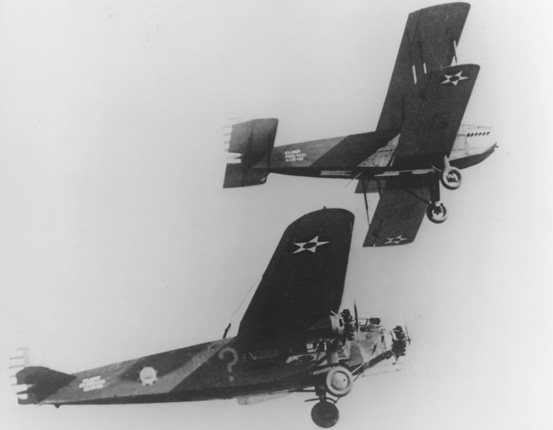
Squadron C-2A Question Mark being refueled by a Douglas C-1

The squadron's second predecessor was organized at Bolling Field, District of Columbia on 1 April 1928 as the Air Corps Detachment, Bolling Field, DC. It was assigned directly to the Office of Chief of Air Corps until 1933, when it was reassigned to Third Corps Area. It operated a variety of aircraft at Bolling. A Fokker C-2A transport of the squadron participated as the receiving aircraft (Question Mark) in a week-long endurance flight testing the practicability of air refueling. In March 1935, the squadron was redesignated the 14th Bombardment Squadron and assigned to the 9th Bombardment Group at Mitchel Field, New York although the squadron remained at Bolling. The two squadrons were consolidated into a single unit in June 1935 and the consolidated unit was inactivated in September 1936.

=== World War II ===
The squadron was activated again at Hickam Field, Hawaii on 1 February 1940 as one of the original squadrons of the 11th Bombardment Group. It trained with Douglas B-18 Bolo bombers, but by 1941 had begun to receive early model Boeing B-17 Flying Fortresses.

The 19th Bombardment Group had been selected for transfer to the Philippines; however, the need for B-17 bombers there was so urgent that a provisional group already in Hawaii was dispatched to Manila by way of Australia in September. Under the command of Major Emmett O'Donnell Jr., nine B-17s of the 14th Squadron with nine crews made up of the cream of the 5th and 11th Bombardment Groups, pioneered an air ferry route from Hawaii to the Philippines, leaving on 5 September 1941, and arriving on 12 September 1941, at Clark Field, Philippines. This was the first flight of land-based bombers across the central Pacific. A portion of the flight involved traversing uncharted waters from Wake Island to Port Moresby and Darwin and thence to Clark Field. They maintained radio silence over the Japanese mandate islands. Successful completion of this flight proved that the Philippines could be reinforced by air. For achievement in this flight, the airmen of this squadron were awarded the Distinguished Flying Cross.. In December, the squadron was assigned to the 7th Bombardment Group, which was programmed to deploy to the Philippines, but was attached to the 19th Group, which had been established at Clark Field in October.

On 8 December 1941, the Japanese bombed and strafed Clark Field, catching many B-17s and Curtiss P-40 Warhawks on the ground, which were destroyed. Sixteen B-17s of the squadron had moved to Del Monte Field and San Marcelino Airfield and were spared being destroyed. Captain Colin P. Kelly, of the squadron attacked the Japanese Navy heavy cruiser Ashigara, thought to be a battleship. Captain Kelly was killed when his B-17 was shot down by Japanese fighters as he was returning to Clark Field, and was posthumously awarded the Distinguished Service Cross.

The air echelon of the squadron was evacuated to Batchelor Field, Australia on 24 December 1941, while the ground echelon stayed to fight at Clark Field, as infantry in the Philippines as part of the Battle of the Philippines under the command of 5th Interceptor Command. Orders were soon received from Far East Air Force to move to Java, and the air echelon relocated from Batchelor Field to Singosari Airfield, Java on 30 December 1941.

The 19th Group flew missions from Singosari Airfield, attacking enemy aircraft, ground installations, warships and transports during the later stages of the Battle of the Philippines and the Dutch East Indies campaign between January and March 1942. The group earned a total of four United States Presidential Distinguished Unit Citations for actions in the Philippine Islands and Dutch East Indies. The air echelon of 14th Bombardment Squadron ceased operating from Singosari, Java on 1 March 1942, and began moving to Melbourne, Australia. Arriving at Essendon Airport, Melbourne on 4 March 1942, the air echelon of 14th Bombardment Squadron began operating from Essendon, Australia.

On 14 March 1942, the air echelon of 14th Bombardment Squadron was detached from the 19th Bombardment Group and ceased operations, with men and equipment transferred to other units. The 14th Bombardment Squadron continued as an active unit, but was not manned or equipped, and was inactivated on 2 April 1946 and disbanded on 19 August 1949.

== Lineage ==
14th Bombardment Squadron

- Organized as the 1st Aviation School Squadron on 9 May 1917

Redesignated: 14th Aero Squadron on 20 August 1917 (Note: Another 14th Aero Squadron had been activated at Kelly Field, Texas, on 14 June 1917. It was redesignated the 19th Aero Squadron on 26 June 1917. Today it is the 19th Fighter Squadron.)
Redesignated Squadron A, Rockwell Field on 23 July 1918
Demobilized on 23 November 1918

- Reconstituted and consolidated with the 14th Bombardment Squadron on 8 June 1935

Inactivated on 1 September 1936 (Note: The squadron was a Regular Army Inactive (RAI) unit in the Eighth Corps Area by December 1937, conducting summer training at Kelly Field, Texas. Clay, p. 1382. RAI units were units that were constituted in the regular army. Although they were not activated, they were organized with reserve personnel during the 1920s and 1930s. Even though they had reserve personnel assigned, they were not Organized Reserve units. Because they had no regular personnel they were still considered inactive in the regular army. Clay, p. vi.)

- Redesignated 14th Bombardment Squadron (Medium) on 22 December 1939

Activated on 1 February 1940
Redesignated 14th Bombardment Squadron (Heavy) on 20 November 1940
Redesignated 14th Bombardment Squadron, Heavy c. August 1943
Inactivated on 2 April 1946

- Disbanded on 19 August 1949

Air Corps Detachment, Bolling Field

- Organized on 1 April 1928 as Air Corps Detachment, Bolling Field, DC

Redesignated 14th Bombardment Squadron on 1 March 1935
Consolidated with Squadron A, Rockwell Field on 8 June 1935

=== Assignments ===
- Unknown, 1917–1918
- Office of Chief of Air Corps, 1 April 1928
- Third Corps Area, 28 August 1933
- 9th Bombardment Group, 1 March 1935 – 1 September 1936
- 11th Bombardment Group, 1 February 1940
- 7th Bombardment Group, 2 December 1941 – 2 April 1946 (attached to 19th Bombardment Group, 2-c. 24 December 1941, air echelon attached to 19th Bombardment Group, c. 24 December 1941 – c. 14 March 14; ground echelon attached as infantry to the 5th Interceptor Command, c. 24 December 1941 – May 1942)

=== Stations ===
- Rockwell Field, California, 9 May 1917 – 23 November 1918
- Bolling Field, Washington, D.C., 1 April 1928 – 1 September 1936
- Hickam Field, Hawaii Territory, 1 February 1940
- Clark Field, Luzon, Philippines, 16 September 1941 (Note: Clay indicates the squadron deployed to Del Monte Airfield on 6 December 1941. Clay, p. 1382.)
- Bugo, Mindanao, Philippines, (Ground echelon) 1 January – May 1942 (air echelon operated from: Batchelor Airfield, Australia, c. 24 December – c. 30 December 1941; Singosari Airport, Java, Netherlands East Indies, 30 December 1941–c. 1 March 1942; Essendon Airport, Australia, c. 4 March – c. 14 March 1942)

=== Aircraft ===
- Curtiss JN-4, Curtiss JN-6, and Thomas-Morse S-4
- Curtiss O-1 Falcon, 1928 – c. 1930
- Douglas O-2 and Curtiss P-1 Hawk, 1928 – c. 1931
- O-38, 1931–1935
- de Haviland DH-4, Curtiss A-3 Falcon, Douglas C-1, Fokker C-2, Ford C-4, Fokker C-5, Sikorsky C-6, Ford C-9 Trimotor, Lockheed Y1C-12 Vega, Lockheed Y1C-17 Vega, Northrop Y1C-19 Alpha, Lockheed Y1C-23 Altair, Curtiss C-30 Condor, Douglas C-34, Curtiss O-11 Falcon, Curtiss O-13 Falcon, Douglas O-29, Douglas O-43, Loening OA-1, Boeing PW-9, Boeing P-12, Boeing P-26 Peashooter, Curtiss AT-5 Hawk, Consolidated PT-1 Trusty, Douglas BT-2, and apparently Boeing YB-9, Martin B-10, Douglas C-29 Dolphin, and Thomas-Morse YO-20 during the period 1928–1936
- Douglas B-18 Bolo, 1940–1941
- Boeing B-17 Flying Fortress, 1941–1942
- Probably Consolidated B-24 Liberator and Consolidated LB-30, 1941–1942

== See also ==
- List of American Aero Squadrons
- United States Army Air Forces in Australia
