= Bird of Paradise (aircraft) =

U.S. Army Air Corps plane

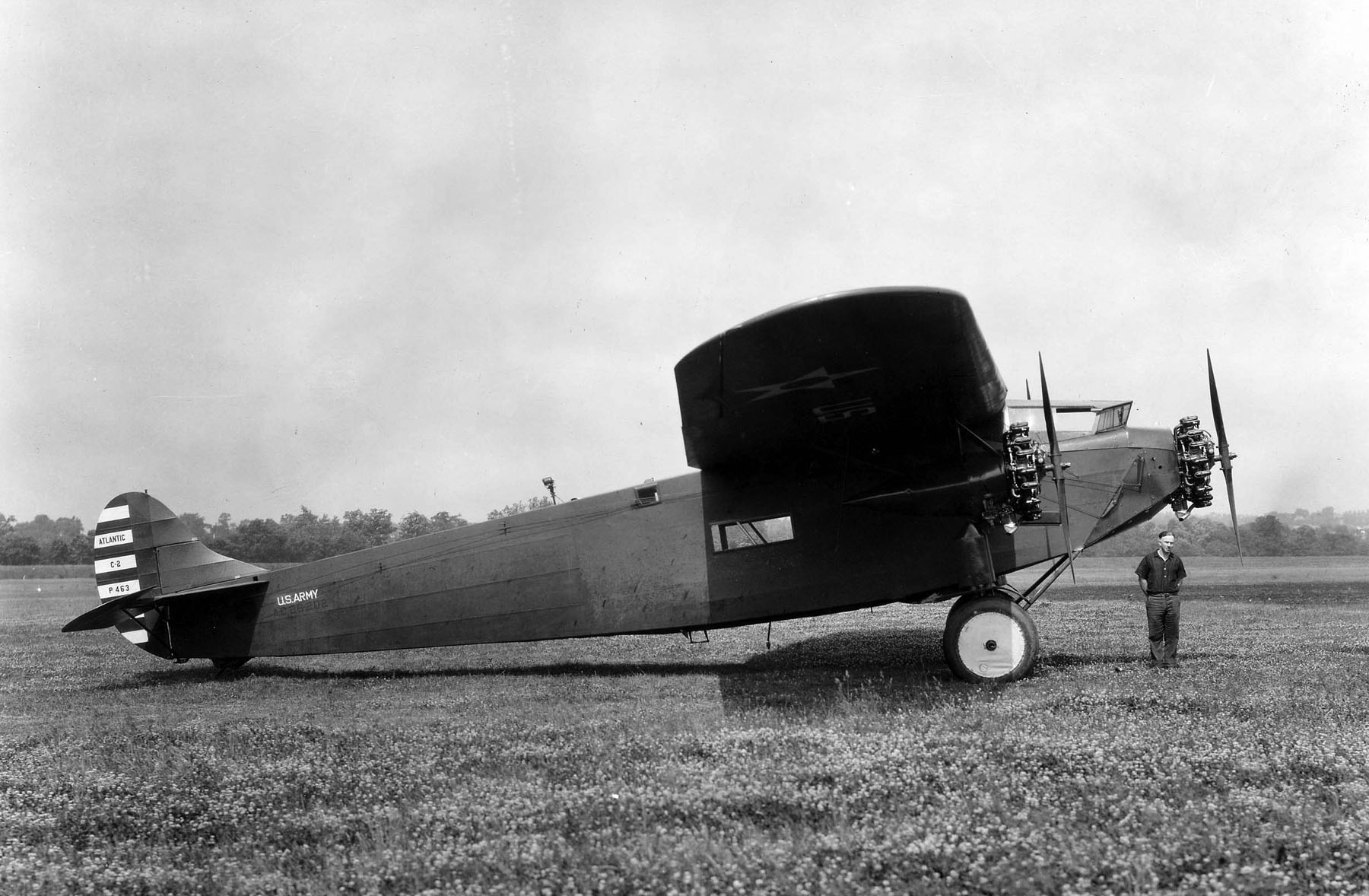
- Fokker C-2 Bird of Paradise

General information
- Other name: Bird of Paradise
- Type: Atlantic-Fokker C-2
- Manufacturer: Atlantic Aircraft Corporation
- Owners: United States Army Air Corps
- Serial: 26-202

History
- First flight: 1927
- In service: 1927–1930
- Fate: Scrapped at Wright Field in 1944

The Bird of Paradise was a military airplane used by the United States Army Air Corps in 1927 to experiment with the application of radio beacon aids in air navigation. On June 28–29, 1927, the Bird of Paradise, crewed by 1st Lt. Lester J. Maitland and 1st Lt. Albert F. Hegenberger, completed the first flight over the Pacific Ocean from the mainland, California, to Hawaii. For this feat the crew received the Mackay Trophy.

The Bird of Paradise was one of three Atlantic-Fokker C-2 tri-motor transport aircraft developed for the Air Corps from the civilian Fokker F.VIIa/3m airliner design. Its two-ton carrying capacity gave it the ability to carry sufficient fuel for the 2,500 miles (4,000 km) flight and its three motors provided an acceptable safety factor in the event one engine failed. Moreover, although modified for the long distance flight, the C-2 was a widely used standard design, demonstrating the practicality of flying long distances.

Although the recognition accorded Maitland and Hegenberger was less in comparison with the extensive adulation given to Charles Lindbergh for his transatlantic flight only five weeks earlier, their feat was arguably more significant from a navigational standpoint.

== Background ==
Planning for a transoceanic flight began in February 1919 at McCook Field in Dayton, Ohio, by members of the Air Service, the immediate forerunner of the Air Corps. 2nd Lt. Albert F. Hegenberger, an MIT-trained aeronautical engineer assigned to the Air Service Engineering Division, established the Instrument Branch to study ideas in air navigation (or avigation, as it was referred to at that time), and produce "new developments in compasses, airspeed meters, driftmeters, sextants, and maps." Hegenberger educated himself in over-water flight by attending a U.S. Navy course in navigation at Pensacola, Florida, that included flights over the Gulf of Mexico practicing dead reckoning and celestial navigation.

"For several months the Army Air Corps has been considering the possibility of having one of its most recent models of transport airplanes fly from California to Hawaii. The object of the flight primarily is to subject navigation instruments to a thorough test in practical use. The flight to Hawaii necessitates traversing the air for 2,407 miles (3,874 km) over water and, therefore, presents unusual problems."
Air Corps News Letter
June 27, 1927

The Engineering Division, which evolved into the Air Corps's Materiel Division, (Note: The Materiel Division was created at McCook Field in October 1926 from the Engineering Division as a result of the Air Corps Act of 1926, and placed under the command of new Assistant Chief of Air Corps Brig. Gen. William E. Gillmore. (Head 1995, pp. 115–116)) developed a multitude of pioneering flight and air navigation instruments that enabled civil as well as military aviation to reach its potential. In perfecting the equipment in hundreds of tests, McCook Field's engineers and test pilots also created new navigation methods in collaboration with other agencies, including the Navy. A program for a transpacific flight from California to Hawaii (over a distance officially considered by the Army to be 2,407 miles (3,874 km)) was developed in February 1920 by the Instrument Branch and simulated many times during testing.

While the primary goal of the Instrument Branch was effective instrumentation, development of an all-weather and night navigation capability contributed to a larger goal espoused by the Air Service's Assistant Director, Brig. Gen. Billy Mitchell: extending the mission of the Air Service beyond the doctrinal role of "auxiliary" ground support. Mitchell's strategy was to generate public support for growth of military aeronautics and funding of the Air Service by a publicity campaign using air shows, flight demonstrations, and the setting of various aviation records. Among those participating in the varied events was 1st Lt. Lester J. Maitland, assigned to the Testing Squadron at Wilbur Wright Field, Ohio. Maitland was transferred to Hawaii in May 1919 for a two-year tour. There he submitted a request to the Chief of the Air Service to organize a transpacific flight between Hawaii and the mainland using the new two-engined Martin NBS-1 bomber, a prototype of which had been at McCook Field. When his first request was refused, he renewed the request in 1924 from Wilbur Wright Field, now called the Fairfield Air Intermediate Depot (FAID), while on temporary duty as a staff officer for Major Augustine Warner Robins.

At McCook Field in 1923, Hegenberger (who had also become a Robins protégé) worked closely with engineer Bradley Jones, a leading authority on air navigation, to test and adapt for military purposes an earth inductor compass developed by the Pioneer Instrument Company in conjunction with the National Bureau of Standards. (Note: In Fiscal Years 1921–1923, the Air Service allocated $4,000 of its experimental funds to the Bureau of Standards to develop specifications for the earth inductor compass, and then contracted with two manufacturers to purchase nine, delivered in December 1922 and January 1923. The first earth inductor compass in history was flight tested at McCook Field on May 26, 1923. (Air Corps News Letter June 3, 1927; Vol. XI No. 7, pp. 167–169).) Hegenberger designed an instrument panel incorporating the earth inductor compass, a driftmeter, and a magnetic compass for a navigation station at which sextant readings could also be taken; and a cockpit panel with a dial connected to the navigation station that indicated to the pilot if he was steering to the right or left of the course set by the inductor compass. On September 6, 1923, Hegenberger and Jones successfully tested the equipment by navigating from Dayton to Boston, Massachusetts in a DH-4, above unbroken clouds that completely prevented them from seeing any landmarks on the ground.

Hegenberger transferred to Hawaii later that year, where he persistently submitted written requests for a transpacific flight that like Maitland's were repeatedly refused. (Note: Of their numerous requests to him (which he quipped "bored me to death"), Major General Mason Patrick, Chief of the Air Corps, explained that his refusals had been because "the time was not yet ripe" for the attempt. (Air Corps News Letter August 9, 1927; Vol. XI No. 10, p. 240; reprinted in Maurer 1987, pp. 257, 260)) In October 1926 Hegenberger returned to McCook as chief of the Equipment Branch, where he worked with the Signal Corps Aircraft Radio Laboratory at FAID (Note: The lab had formerly been the Radio Branch at FAID, where it tested the direction-finding concept as part of the Air Service's "Model Airway System," an experimental airline (and the first regularly scheduled cargo and passenger air system in the United States) begun in June 1922 between McCook, Bolling, Mitchel, and Langley Fields. Radio direction was used to guide aircraft between Chanute Field, Illinois, and Langin Field, West Virginia, where beacon stations were situated. Langin was a small field next to the Ohio River in Moundsville, West Virginia, used from 1921 to 1932 as a midway refueling point between Dayton and Washington, D.C. The field was surveyed by Jimmy Doolittle in 1920 and built at Air Service request the next year. (Head 1995, pp. 110–111)) in testing an "interlocking" navigation system that used signals from four-course radio range beacons to define an airway. He was authorized to plan a transpacific test flight from California to Hawaii to demonstrate the more difficult task of navigating not to a land mass but to "a tiny island in a big ocean," using radio beacons as a navigational aid. Hegenberger described the method:

An electric current is sent through the air at a set wave length and forms an airway along which the aircraft travels to its destination. The airway has three parallel zones – the T, N, and A zones. The T zone is the center of the road. It is about two miles wide at its maximum. While his ship stays in the center zone the pilot gets the (Morse) code letter T (— "dash") through his receiving set. If he veers to the right, the T changes to an A (· — "dot-dash"); if he swings to the left, the T gives way to N (— · "dash-dot"). All the pilot has to do when he hears N or A is to correct his course.

The navigation equipment developed at McCook Field took the concept one step further by wiring the RDF receiver into the cockpit instrument panel. Three lights provided visual cues to the pilot: a red light that illuminated when the aircraft was left of the airway, a green light when it was to the right, and a white light between them that indicated on course when steadily lit.

In the meantime, in November 1926, Maitland was transferred from FAID to Washington, D.C. to be Assistant Executive Officer to Assistant Secretary of War for Air F. Trubee Davison. There he was tentatively granted authorization for a flight to Hawaii with Hegenberger as navigator, radio operator, flight engineer, and relief pilot, pending the results of field trials to be run on the aircraft selected for the task.

== Preparations ==
=== Aircraft acquisition, modification, and planning ===
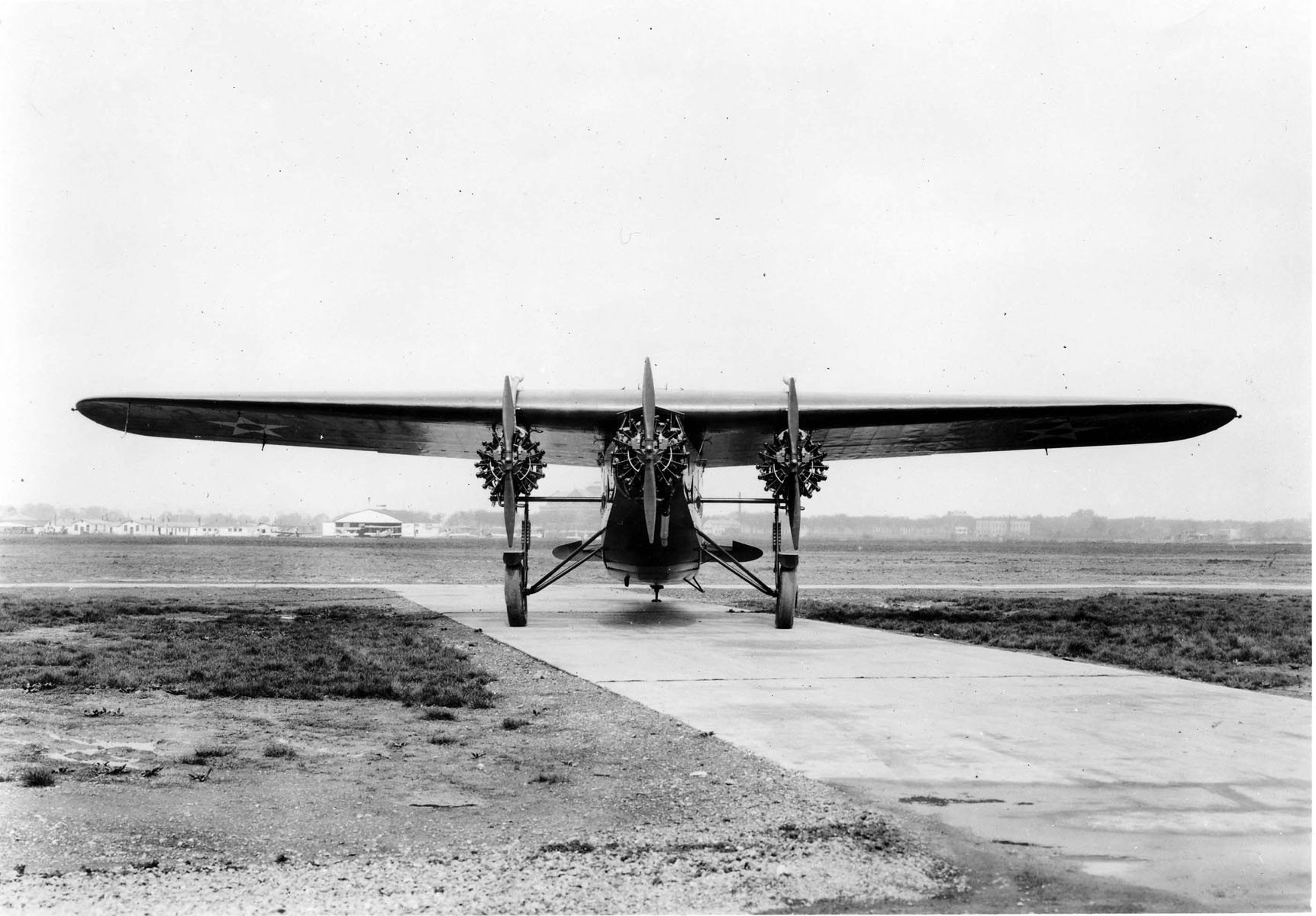
Front view of an unmodified Fokker C-2.

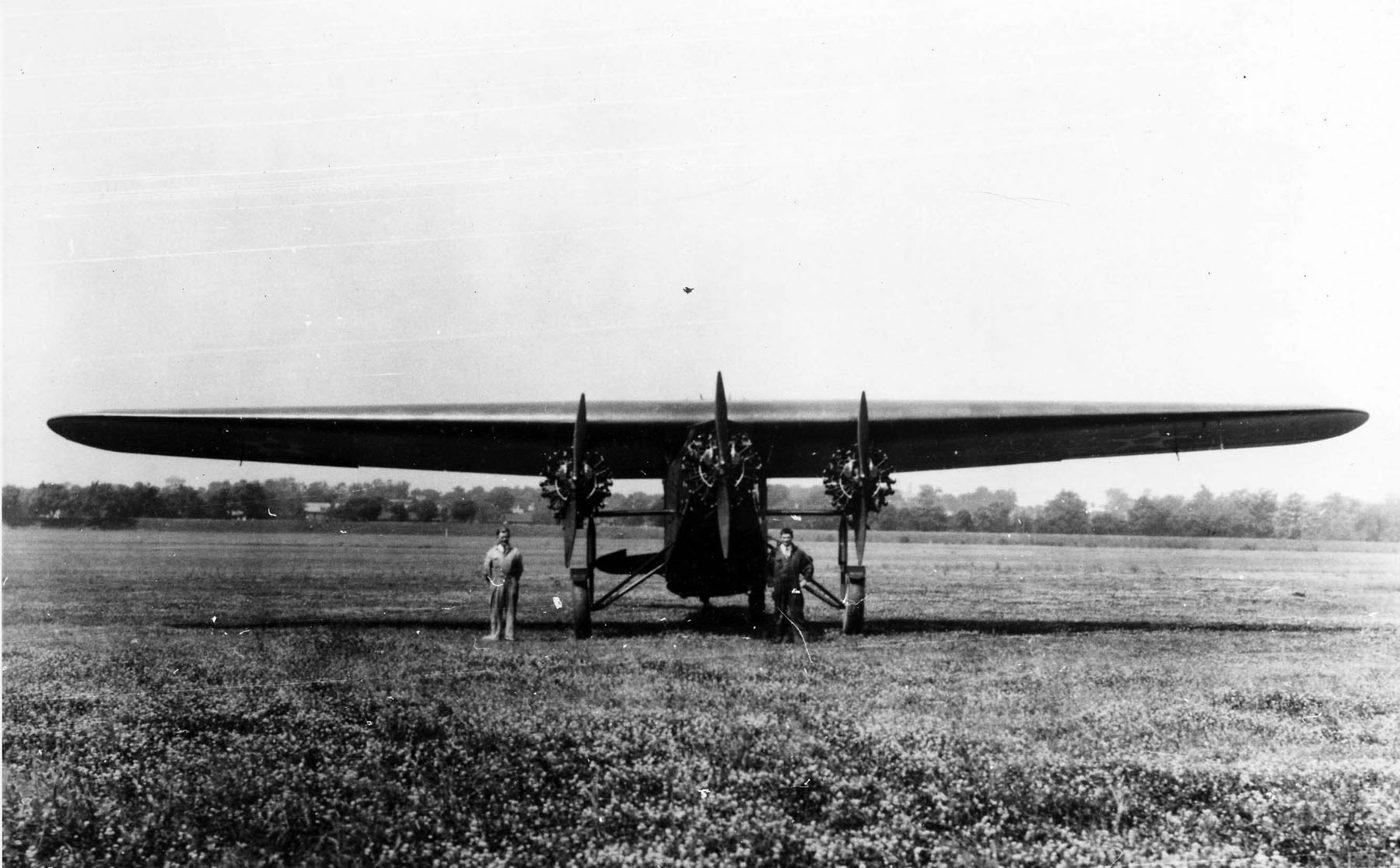
Front view of the modified Bird of Paradise, showing its longer wing.

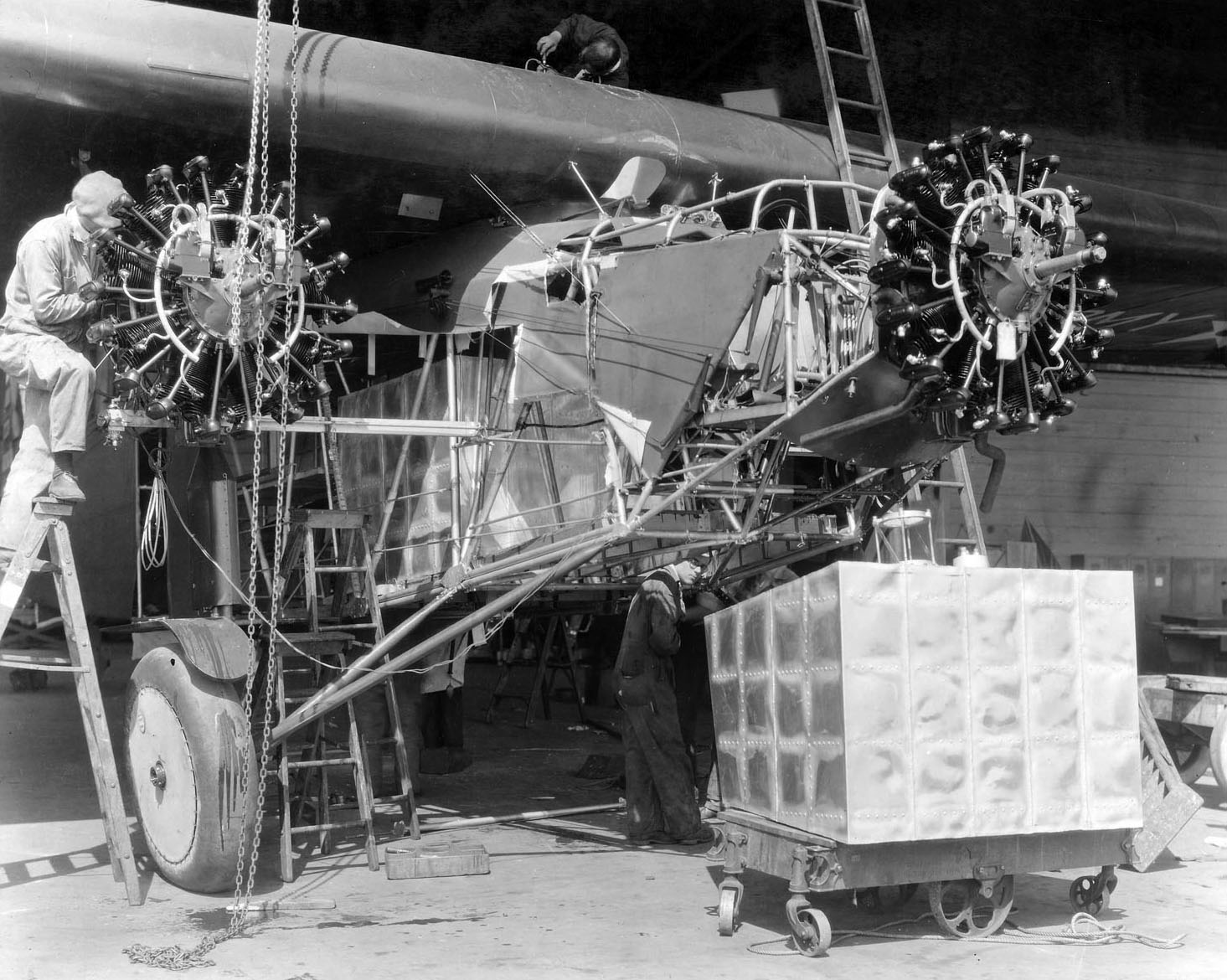
Installation of the auxiliary fuel tanks.

In 1923 the Air Service established many distance and endurance records, including using a modified Fokker T-2 transport to set an endurance record of more than 36 hours aloft (and seven other world records as well) during a single flight on April 17. It followed this up on May 2 by making the first non-stop transcontinental flight across the United States, a distance equal to that of the flight to Hawaii. While proved capable of transoceanic flight, the T-2 had only a single motor.

In 1926 the Atlantic Aircraft Company (Fokker's U.S. subsidiary) produced a development of the internally braced high-wing monoplane design, the F.VIIa, powered by three 220 horsepower (160 kW) air-cooled Wright J-5 motors instead of the single 400 horsepower (300 kW) water-cooled Liberty 12 of the T-2. The Army ordered three of the "Transport Airplanes" in September 1926 to be designated C-2 and earmarked the first to be sent to the Materiel Division at McCook Field as the test bed for the radio navigational aid testing about to be authorized. This aircraft, Air Corps serial number 26-202, was diverted at Teterboro Airport, New Jersey, for modifications and became the last to be delivered. The wing mounts for the standard 63 feet (19 m) wing were replaced with the center section of the wing mounts for the XLB-2 bomber (Note: The XLB-2 was Atlantic's prototype for a two-engined bomber, 26-210, and would have been the Army's first monoplane bomber had it been accepted. It was a development of the same cantilever monoplane as the transports.) to support a larger 71 feet (22 m) metal wing fabricated by Atlantic.

The larger-winged C-2 was delivered to the Fairfield depot, where it underwent further modifications, installing Hegenberger's instrument panels, other navigation and radio equipment, (Note: In addition to the radio compass and the earth inductor compass, FAID installed four Type B-5 aircraft magnetic compasses, a drift sight, an SC-155 interphone, an SC-134 radio transmitter and BC-138 radio receiver, a sextant, and smoke bombs for measuring drift. (Maurer 1987, p. 258 and Air Corps News Letter May 12, 1928; Vol. XII No. 7, p. 213)) and auxiliary fuel tanks to bring its fuel capacity to approximately 1,100 US gallons (4,200 L; 920 imp gal). Unnecessary equipment, including the passenger seating, was removed to save weight. A passageway to the cockpit was created over the top of the forward auxiliary fuel tank to allow Hegenberger to periodically relieve Maitland at the controls. (Note: Until World War II, all navigators in the Air Corps also had to be rated pilots.) A team of aviation experts was assembled to oversee the modifications that included Jones, Lester A. Hendricks (radio engineer and Assistant Chief of the Materials Laboratory, McCook Field), Fred Herman (aeronautical engineer), Victor E. Showalter (navigation engineer), radio engineers Ford Studebaker and Clayton C. Shangraw (who was also a Reserve officer), and James Rivers, an aircraft mechanic and foreman. Sometime during the modification process the C-2 also picked up a nickname: Bird of Paradise.

After the aircraft was acquired, Hegenberger prepared a flight plan using a Great Circle route, which Charles Lindbergh later characterized as "the most perfectly organized and carefully planned flight ever attempted." Maitland practiced flying one of the Bird of Paradise's sister ships and accrued approximately 6,000 miles (10,000 km) (roughly 60 hours of flight time) in the C-2 by the time the transpacific flight was undertaken.

=== Final testing and approval ===
At 10:50 on the morning of June 15, 1927, Maitland and Hegenberger took off from Fairfield Air Intermediate Depot (FAID) (Note: One week later, on June 22, the acronym was changed to FADR, standing for Fairfield Air Depot (Reservation). It remained FADR until 1931, when it received its permanent name of Patterson Field.) in the Bird of Paradise and flew to Scott Field, Illinois, on the first leg of final flight tests of the airplane's performance. Jones, Herman, and Rivers of the FAID support team flew with them to monitor fuel consumption and the reliability of the equipment. From Scott Field, they continued to Hatbox Field at Muskogee, Oklahoma, where the aircraft stayed overnight. (Note: Hatbox Field was a portion of the general aviation airport at Muskogee leased by the Army for use as a refueling stop. It had originally been acquired as a stop on the final legs of the 1924 Around the World Flight, then became the Army's first permanent airfield in Oklahoma in 1925.) The next day the quintet continued to Kelly Field, Texas, stopping at Dallas en route, where they learned that the transpacific attempt had been announced by the War Department.

During a layover at Kelly Field, repairs were made to the earth inductor compass, one of the Type B-5 magnetic compasses, and the radio. From Kelly Field they flew on to San Diego, California on June 20, stopping at El Paso and Tucson's Davis-Monthan Field along the way. (Note: The original register page is viewable at the Davis-Monthan Register site, and shows that Maitland also flew a C-2, probably a sister aircraft based at Bolling, on the same route a month earlier on May 23, carrying Secretary Davison, Porter Adams (president of the National Aeronautic Association), and several others that included Sgt. Roy Hooe, crew chief of the C-2A Question Mark in its record-breaking 1929 flight.) They arrived at Rockwell Field in San Diego on the afternoon of June 20. At Herman's recommendation, the C-2 had an additional 70 US gallons (260 L; 58 imp gal) fuel tank installed. While in San Diego, Maitland conferred with U.S. Navy Lieut. Byron J. Connell, the pilot of a PN-9 flying boat used in an unsuccessful transpacific attempt in September 1925 by Commander John Rodgers and crew. (Note: Rodgers himself had been killed in an aircraft crash in August 1926. The Navy's attempt to fly to Hawaii failed when the seaplane ran out of fuel 460 miles (740 km) short of destination. (Horvat))

On June 24, the results of the cross country tests were reported to Secretary of War Dwight F. Davis and he approved the flight to Hawaii, pending a final inspection of the aircraft by the Chief of the Air Corps, Gen. Mason Patrick. The next day they flew to Crissy Field in San Francisco, California. When they were 125 miles (201 km) south of Crissy Field their receiver picked up the signal of the Signal Corps beacon installed there. They completed the 2,815 miles (4,530 km) from Wright Field to Crissy Field in slightly more than 33 hours flying time over the ten-day journey and were satisfied with the performance of the Bird of Paradise.

An air of competition greeted the Army flyers upon their arrival in San Francisco resembling that which surrounded Charles Lindbergh's solo transatlantic flight a month earlier. Between the first tentative approval of the transpacific flight in December and its full approval the day before, the excitement generated by Lindbergh's feat inspired a prize of $25,000 to be offered by James D. Dole for the first aviator to make a similar transpacific flight between California and Hawaii. Two civilians, Ernest L. Smith and Charles R. Carter, were across the bay in Oakland, California, nearly ready for a flight to Hawaii, and Hollywood stunt flyer Richard V. "Dick" Grace was in Hawaii preparing to fly solo to the West Coast. The War Department, in disclaimers issued by Secretary Davis, Assistant Secretary Davison, and the two aviators themselves, professed no interest in a "race," and insisted that the timing of the flight was a "coincidence" without connection to any prize or aspirations by civilian flyers. The Air Corps announced that the purpose of its flight was testing of the radio beacon navigational aids at Crissy Field and at Paia, Maui, Hawaii. Hegenberger and Maitland, ineligible for the Dole prize in any case, also turned down $10,000 for publication of their story. Nevertheless, Smith and Carter intensified their preparations to be able to take off first.

The runway of Crissy Field, situated beside the bay on the grounds of the Presidio, was approximately 3,000 feet (900 m) in length but was too short for a fully loaded C-2 to acquire lift speed during its takeoff roll. On June 27, Maitland and Hegenberger flew the Bird of Paradise across San Francisco Bay to the newly opened Oakland Municipal Airport, whose 7000 foot (2,100 meter) runway was acceptable for the anticipated gross weight of 13,500 pounds (6,100 kg) with full fuel load. The aircraft was parked near Smith and Carter's Travel Air 5000, City of Oakland, (see photograph) and given a final service check by its support crew. Gen. Patrick also inspected the C-2 and approved a takeoff for the next day. The airplane took on 1,134 US gallons (4,290 L) of gasoline, 40 US gallons (150 L) of oil, and had an inflatable rubber raft, tinned beef, hardtack, and 5 US gallons (19 L) of water stowed on board for survival if they came down in the ocean as had the PN-9 in 1925. Parachutes, however, were not provided.

== Bird of Paradise sets off on nonstop flight to Hawaii ==
=== Daylight checkpoints ===
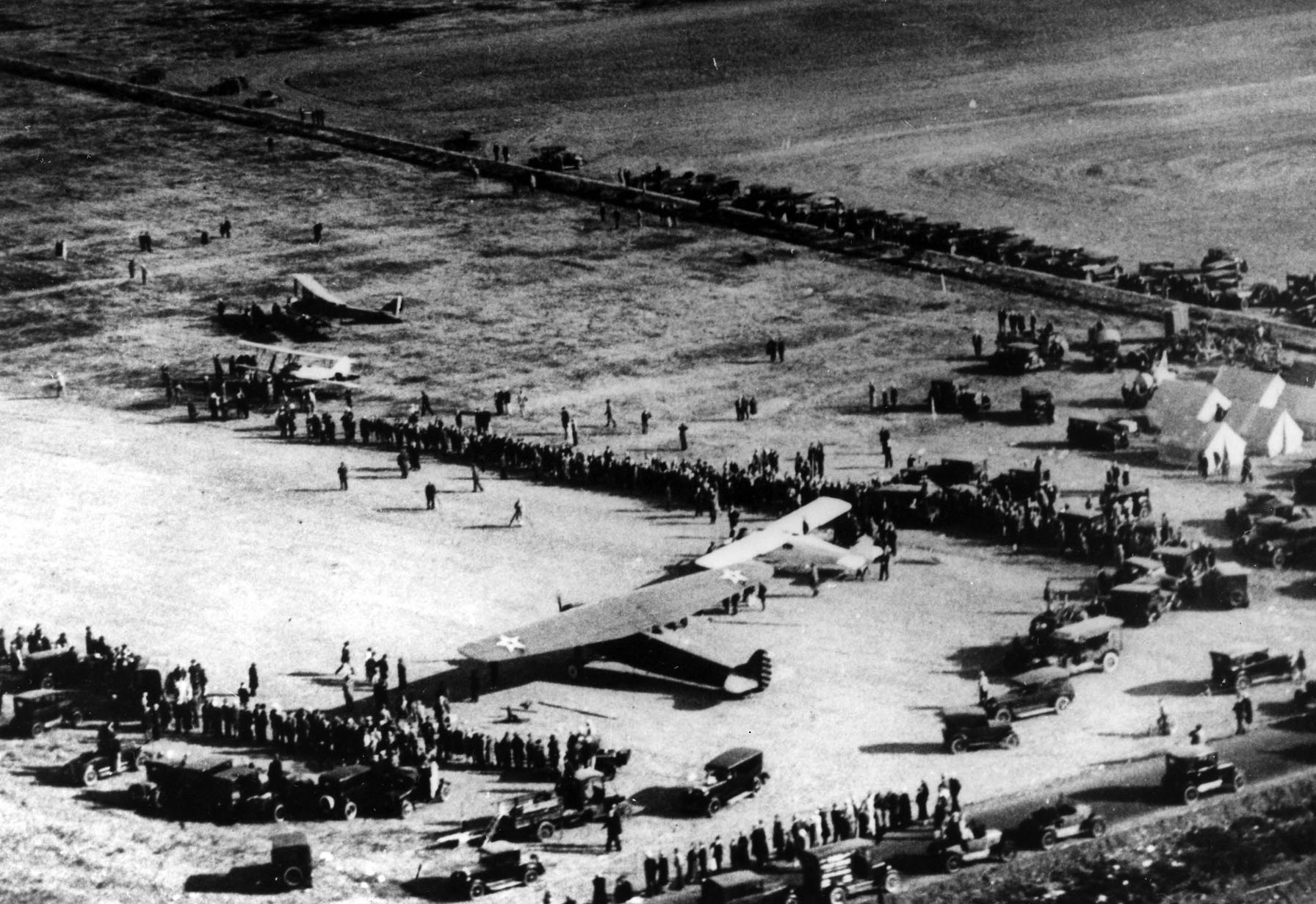
The Bird of Paradise at Oakland, ready for takeoff. Smith and Carter's City of Oakland, to its immediate right, is also preparing to depart.

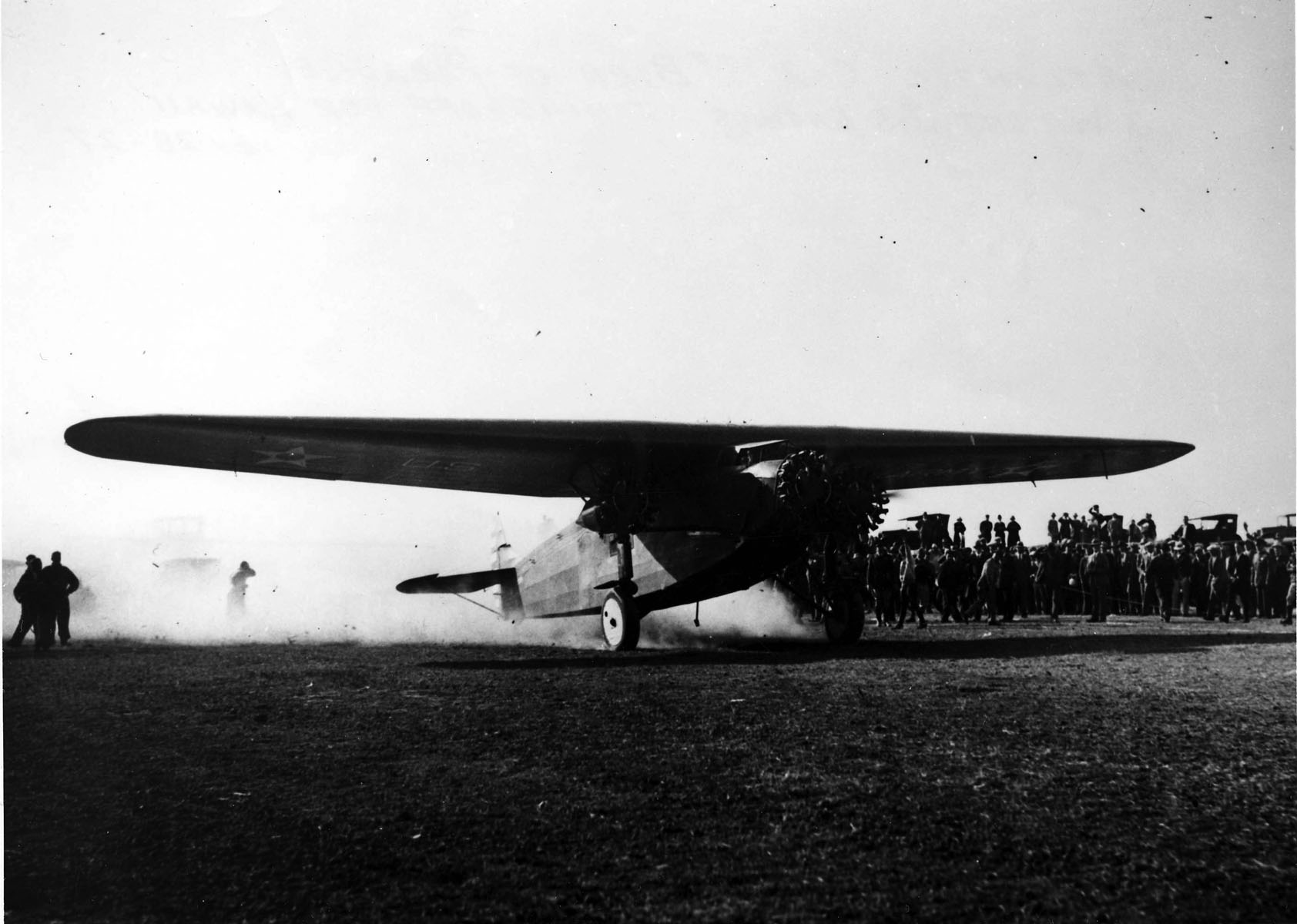
Taking off from Oakland.

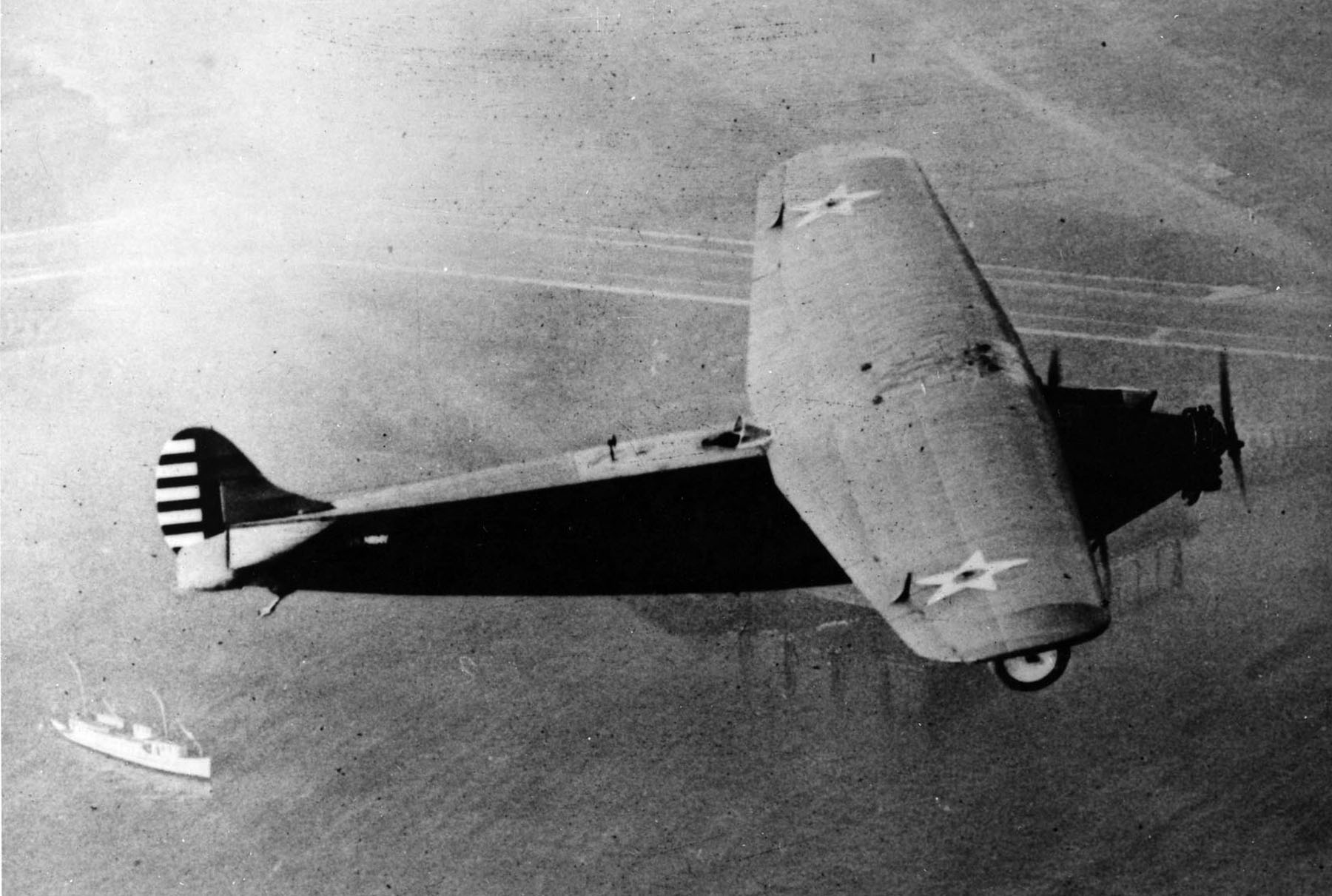
In flight toward Hawaii.

Weather conditions appeared favorable on the morning of Tuesday, June 28, 1927. An in-flight meal of soup in thermos bottles, chicken sandwiches, and coffee was placed aboard the Bird of Paradise, along with drinking water and chocolate bars. Maitland and Hegenberger shook hands with their support team and Gen. Patrick, who reportedly told them, quoted in Aero Digest: "God bless you, my boys, I know you'll make it."

The three motors of the Bird of Paradise started without problem and they took off at 7:09 a.m. at an airborne speed of 93 miles per hour (150 km/h), after a takeoff roll of 4,600 feet (1,400 m). Their destination was Wheeler Field, an Army airfield on the island of Oahu. The Bird of Paradise climbed to an altitude of 2,000 feet (610 m), escorted by other Army aircraft, and crossed the Golden Gate. The C-2's initial cruise speed, in light winds and clear conditions, was 108 miles per hour (174 km/h). Smith and Carter took off in City of Oakland soon after but returned to Oakland to repair damage to their aircraft, then abandoned the attempt entirely. In Hawaii, Grace never took off at all.

The earth inductor compass failed soon after takeoff and after an attempt to fix it, Hegenberger disregarded the instrument. At 7:45 a.m. he picked up the Crissy beacon as planned, but within an hour the receiver failed. Hegenberger seemingly repaired the radio by switching out the batteries, but the signal was lost again after another thirty minutes, forcing Hegenberger to navigate by dead reckoning using the magnetic compass and driftmeter. As part of his pre-flight planning, Hegenberger had computed azimuth and altitude for the sun, as well as selecting stars for sighting, for various points along the route. He used these figures for celestial observations to supplement his dead reckoning.

Hegenberger attempted to check wind drift by launching smoke bombs (carried for that purpose) over the tail, but was hindered by glare. Strong crosswinds that lasted all morning and rough surface conditions made use of the smoke bombs beneath the aircraft ineffectual. Hegenberger was able to visually confirm their course by sighting the Army transport ship Chateau Thierry, as planned, as it approached California. By 9:00 a.m., however, the clear weather gave way to increasing cloud cover. Maitland held the Bird of Paradise at 1,500 feet (460 m), just above the undercast, to enable Hegenberger to attempt intermittent drift readings of the ocean waves through holes in the clouds, but by 9:30 a.m. he was forced to cruise at just 300 feet (91 m) altitude to be able to see the ocean's surface. Strong winds and rain hampered the effort and obscured the horizon. Hegenberger took drift readings through the floor of the airplane and used the sextant to shoot the sun when it occasionally broke through the clouds.

Five hours into the flight, Hegenberger decided to alter course to confirm his calculations with another visual checkpoint. Using its noon position, he plotted an intercept of the Matson passenger liner SS Sonoma, overflying the ship at 2:45 p.m. when it was 724 miles (1,165 km) from San Francisco. Hegenberger recorded that the C-2 had picked up a strong tail wind around noon, pushing them for the remainder of the flight at an average speed of 115 miles per hour (185 km/h), and plotted a new course parallel to the original.

A final checkpoint contact by daylight was attempted with the Dollar Line steamship SS President Cleveland. However, with visibility impossible in the numerous squalls, Hegenberger had to settle for establishing radio contact, which he did at 7:10 p.m. The ship reported its current position as 1,157 miles (1,862 km) from San Francisco and northeast winds of 30 miles per hour (48 km/h). However, when Hegenberger tried to obtain a position fix by radio direction finding, the transmitter signal from the Bird of Paradise was too weak for the ship to obtain a bearing.

Before dark, and approximately halfway through the flight, the crew attempted to eat their inflight meal, but neither was able to locate the sandwiches or themos bottles. One of them was later quoted as saying the missing food was "the only mishap of the flight", and that they eventually concluded (incorrectly) that the food had never been placed aboard.

=== Darkness and daybreak ===
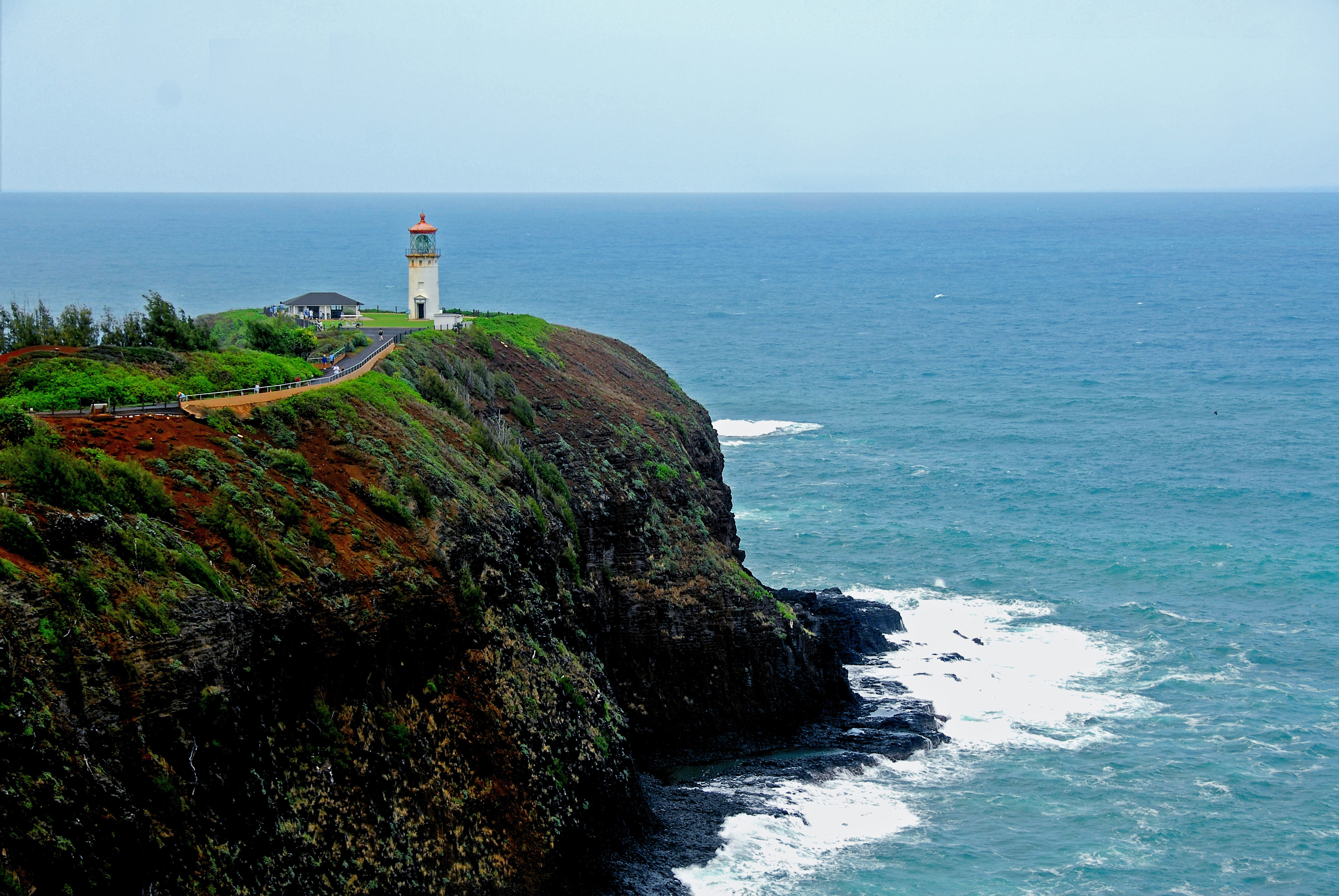
Kilauea Light, 2008

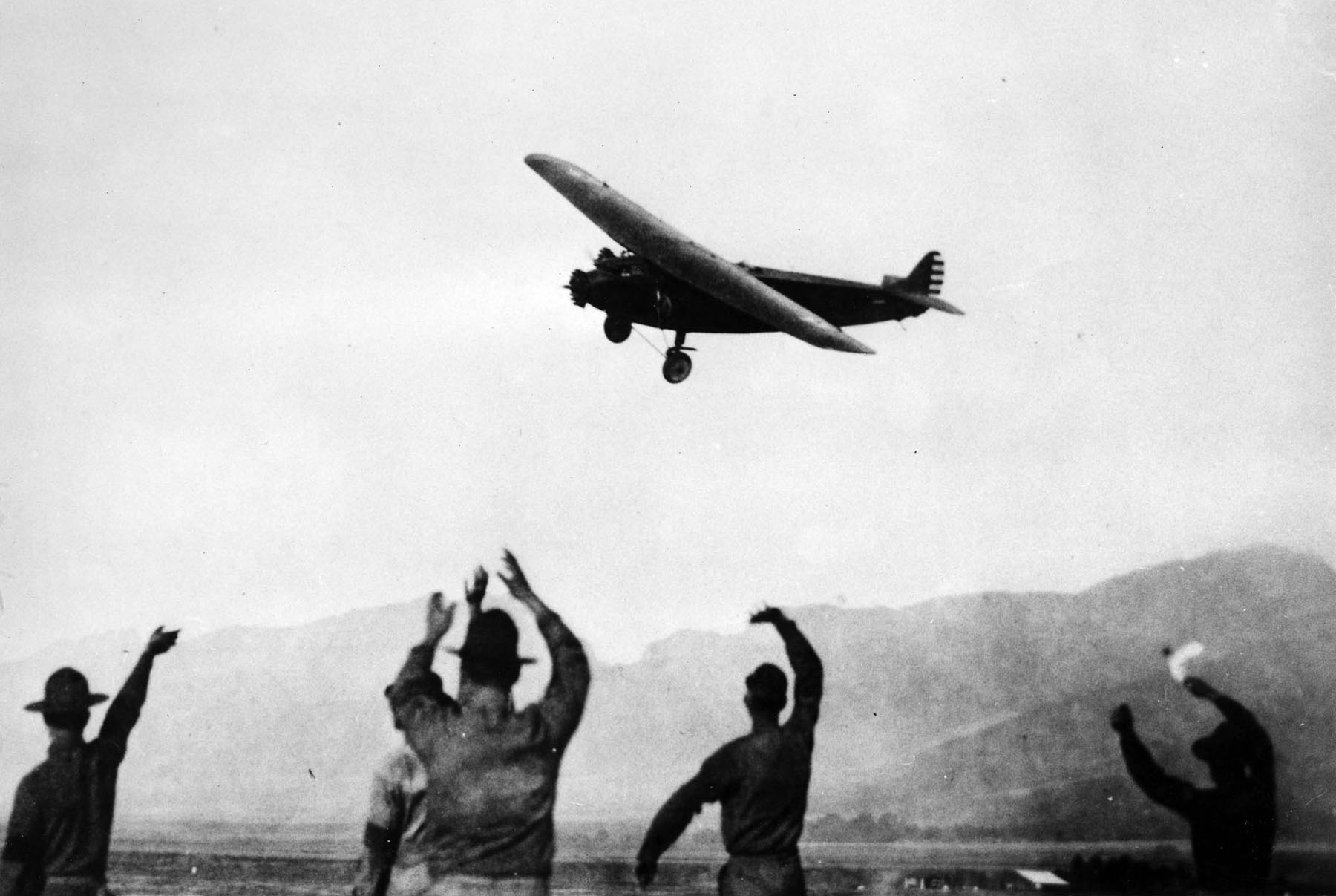
Arrival at Wheeler Field.

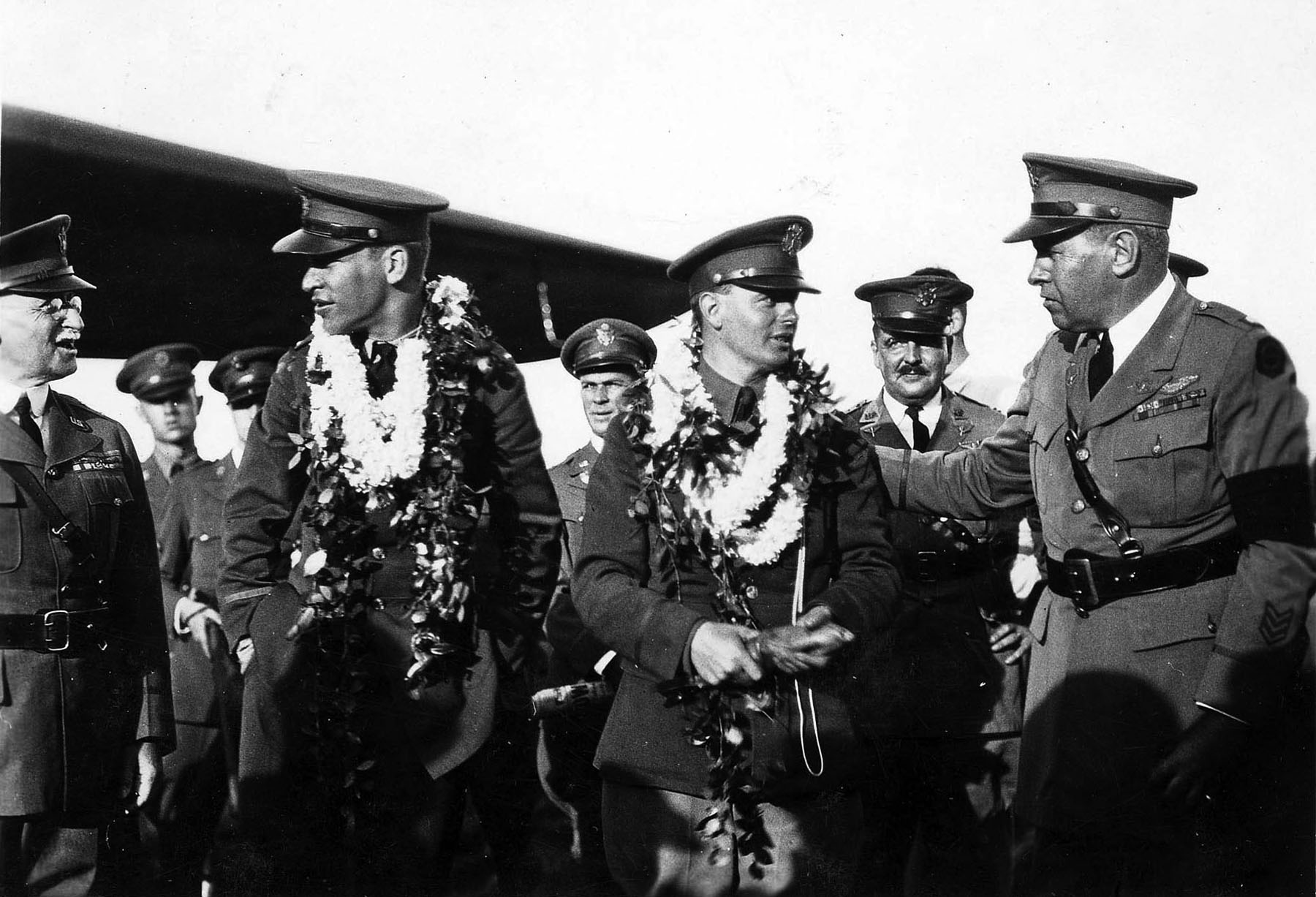
Maitland (left, with lei) and Hegenberger (center, with lei) at Wheeler Field, Hawaii, after the flight

At sunset, Maitland climbed the Bird of Paradise to an altitude of 10,000 feet (3,000 m) to place it above the clouds, where Hegenberger could frequently check their position by star sightings. At 1:00 a.m. Hegenberger made another attempt to acquire a radio compass reading and picked up the signal from the Maui transmitter. He found that the Bird of Paradise was south (left) of its course, instead of north (right) as they had thought. The Maui signal guided them for forty minutes before cutting out entirely.

At approximately 2:00 a.m. (19 hours into the flight) the center engine on the Bird of Paradise ran rough and quit, causing the aircraft to slowly lose altitude. Flying for an hour and a half on two engines, the C-2 gradually descended to 4,000 feet (1,200 m). Warmer air melted ice that had accumulated over the center engine's carburetor intake, allowing it to be restarted. The icing had occurred because the heaters for the air intakes had been removed during modifications, as a power conservation measure, when Hegenberger's flight plan did not anticipate encountering temperatures cold enough to require their use. With full power restored, Maitland climbed the Bird of Paradise to 7,000 feet (2,100 m), where scattered breaks in the clouds allowed star sightings to be made.

Two hours later, Hegenberger's final star sights indicated that they were again "well north" of the planned route and that a 90 degree turn to the left was indicated. Maitland, "after some persuasion," agreed and altered course. Just before 6:00 a.m. (3:20 a.m. Hawaii time), 23 hours into the flight and at their estimated time of arrival, the crew observed the lighthouse beam of the Kilauea Point Light Station on Kauai five degrees to the left of the nose of the aircraft. (Note: The sighting of the lighthouse has created a myth that the pair were lost but were saved when they spotted its beam. Particularly fanciful is an assertion in an article in the September 24, 1999 Honolulu Star-Bulletin that they "missed the islands by hundreds of miles. Luckily, at dawn Hegenberger caught the last flashes of a lighthouse on Kauai and they were able to change course." The 1978 nomination form for placing the lighthouse on the National Register of Historic Places also claims that they were lost but is rife with careless errors and self-contradictions, among them that the flight "embarked" on June 29 (it arrived that date), that the fliers "heard" a signal (they observed the light beam), that they "utilized the radio beacon" (the Kauai radio beacon had not yet been installed—a fact stated later in the same document), that they landed at Hickam Field (it was Wheeler—Hickam did not open until 1938), that they were "low on fuel" (they had 250 US gallons (950 L; 210 imp gal) remaining of an original 1,120 US gallons (4,200 L; 930 imp gal)—enough to fly 800 miles (1,300 km) or approximately eight hours more), and that they "glanced back" (the light was seen 5 degrees left of the nose) "and recognized the unique double flash" (contradicting the earlier assertion that they heard a signal and calculated their position from it).)

Flying in rain and complete darkness 100 miles (160 km) from Wheeler Field (an hour's flying time), Maitland decided to cut his airspeed to about 70 miles per hour (110 km/h) and circle over the Kauai Channel until daybreak, another two hours of flight, so that he could transit the mountainous terrain of Oahu visually in daylight. The Bird of Paradise crossed the channel just below the cloud bottoms at an altitude of 750 feet (230 m), then dropped to 500 feet (150 m) to approach Wheeler Field from the northwest. Maitland observed what appeared to be thousands of spectators, and then the smoke from a salute by a field artillery gun. He made a low pass over the field to acknowledge the crowd before landing at 6:29 a.m. Hawaii time, Wednesday, June 29.

The Bird of Paradise completed its flight to Hawaii in 25 hours and 50 minutes. A detachment of military police, including mounted M.P.s from nearby Schofield Barracks, surrounded the C-2 to protect it from the crowd. The flyers climbed out of their airplane to be greeted by various dignitaries that included the Wheeler Field base commander Maj. Henry J.F. Miller, the Hawaiian Department commanding general Edward M. Lewis, then-Territorial Governor Wallace R. Farrington (Hawaii would become a state in 1959), the stunt man Dick Grace, and their mutual friend 1st Lt. John Griffith, who found the misplaced food when he inspected the aircraft—beneath Hegenberger's plotting board under a tarpaulin.

== Aftermath and legacy ==
Hegenberger and Maitland remained in Hawaii at the newly opened Royal Hawaiian Hotel, a stay that included a traditional Hawaiian banquet. On July 6, they boarded the liner Maui to return to San Francisco after Gen. Patrick refused their request to fly the Bird of Paradise back to the mainland. The C-2 was instead assigned to the 18th Pursuit Group at Wheeler Field. Upon their return to the United States on July 12, the officers made a flying tour of the country in a C-2 sister ship that included stops in Milwaukee, Wisconsin (Maitland's home town; July 18), McCook Field (July 20), Washington D.C. (July 21), and Boston (Hegenberger's home town; July 23). In Boston they met Commander Richard E. Byrd and the crew of America, a civilian-owned C-2 that made a transatlantic air mail flight nearly concurrent with the flight to Hawaii.

Ernest Smith and new navigator Emory B. Bronte made a second attempt to fly the Travel Air 5000 to Hawaii on July 14. A radio receiver was installed in their airplane to steer on the Army's Maui beacon, but they received the signal only part of the time. They ran out of fuel and crash-landed in a tree on Molokai. The $25,000 Dole prize was won in August by a pair of civilian aviators participating in the "Dole Air Race", in which only two of the eight participating aircraft reached Hawaii, using the Maui beacon as a guide. Three other aircraft went missing and seven people died.

The flights to Hawaii paved the way the next year for the first transpacific flight to Australia, made by the Southern Cross, a civilian variant of the Atlantic-Fokker trimotor. The Southern Cross, with a four-man crew, used Hawaii as an intermediate stopping point before continuing on to Fiji. Also in 1928 the navigation and communications configuration of the Bird of Paradise was recreated with upgrades in a second C-2 assigned to the Materiel Division (26-203) and used for three years as a "flying radio laboratory". Hegenberger and Bradley Jones instituted a four-month course in air navigation for six rated pilots at Bolling Field in January 1929 using a similarly equipped C-2A variant.

Maitland remained an aide to Secretary Davison until January 1930, when he became a flight instructor at Kelly Field. In 1928 he and Charles Lindbergh were invited together to the White House to meet President Calvin Coolidge. Maitland was eventually promoted to colonel during World War II, commanded a Martin B-26 Marauder bomb group in combat in 1943, then retired from the Air Corps. In the 1950s he became an Episcopal minister. Hegenberger returned to his work with the Materiel Division and won the 1934 Collier Trophy for developing the first blind flying landing system. He rose through the ranks to major general and command of the Tenth Air Force in China during World War II.

The Bird of Paradise continued in service in Hawaii for three years, where it provided inter-island air transport for the Army. (Note: To provide seating for passengers, wicker chairs were installed in the C-2. It made its first flight on July 20, 1927, flying to the "Big Island" and back to test its radio. (ACNLs XI No 12, p. 287, and XII No. 2, p. 59)) On November 15, 1929, it assisted the territorial Board of Agricultural and Forestry on Kauai by sowing seeds of the karaka tree from the air to slow the erosion process in three forest reserves near Waimea Canyon. Staging from Hanapepe airport, a crew of five and a forestry expert dispersed 1,689 pounds (766 kg) of seed in three flights, resulting in forest growth by 1935. Taken out of service in 1930 after the arrival of newer amphibian aircraft, the C-2 was disassembled and placed in storage at Luke Field, Hawaii. After the Territory of Hawaii agreed to preserve and display the aircraft, its legislature in 1931 refused to appropriate funds because of the Great Depression. Several museums expressed an interest in the aircraft, but due to the expense of shipping it to the mainland, none followed through. The Air Corps ordered the Hawaiian Department to build a pavilion at the entrance to Wheeler Field in which to display it, but worsening economic conditions also cancelled this project, and it was shipped back to Wright Field in either 1937 or 1938 for storage. In 1944, despite its obvious historic value, it was reported as intentionally destroyed "because of a critical shortage of storage space needed for the war effort."

In becoming the first to make the transpacific crossing to Hawaii, Maitland and Hegenberger earned the third awarding of the Distinguished Flying Cross by the Air Corps and received the Mackay Trophy for that year. In addition, Hegenberger, Shangraw, and Hendricks were recognized in 1958 as pioneers in the use of radio beacons as a navigational aid by the Professional Group on Aeronautical and Navigational Electronics. Immediately after the flight, Secretary Davison said of the feat, "The flight is unquestionably one of the very greatest aerial accomplishments ever made." 70 years later, the official history of the United States Air Force stated:

A month after Charles Lindbergh flew nonstop from New York to Paris...(Maitland and Hegenberger)...flew...some 2,400 miles (3,900 km) from Oakland [CA] to a landfall on the island of Kauai, then to a safe landing on Oahu. The flight...tested not only the reliability of the machine, but the navigational skill and the stamina of the two officers as well, for had they strayed even three-and-a-half degrees off course, they would have missed Kauai and vanished over the ocean.

== See also ==
- Question Mark (aircraft) – modified Atlantic-Fokker C-2A used for in-flight re-fuelling development; 1928–1929.
- NC-4 (aircraft) – first transatlantic flight, with Atlantic stops; 1919.
- Alcock and Brown – first non-stop transatlantic flight; 1919.
- R34 (airship) – first non-stop airship transatlantic flight, also first non-stop transatlantic east-west flight; 1919.
- Plus Ultra (aircraft) – first flight between Spain and South America, with Atlantic stops; 1926.
- Spirit of St. Louis (aircraft) – first non-stop solo transatlatic flight; 1927.
- Bremen (aircraft) – first non-stop airplane transatlantic east-west flight; 1928.
- Graf Zeppelin (airship) — first non-stop flight across the Pacific; 1930.
- Miss Veedol (aircraft) – first non-stop airplane flight across the Pacific; 1931.
- List of firsts in aviation

== Notes ==
Footnotes

Citations
