= Albert Francis Hegenberger =

American Air Force general (1895–1983)

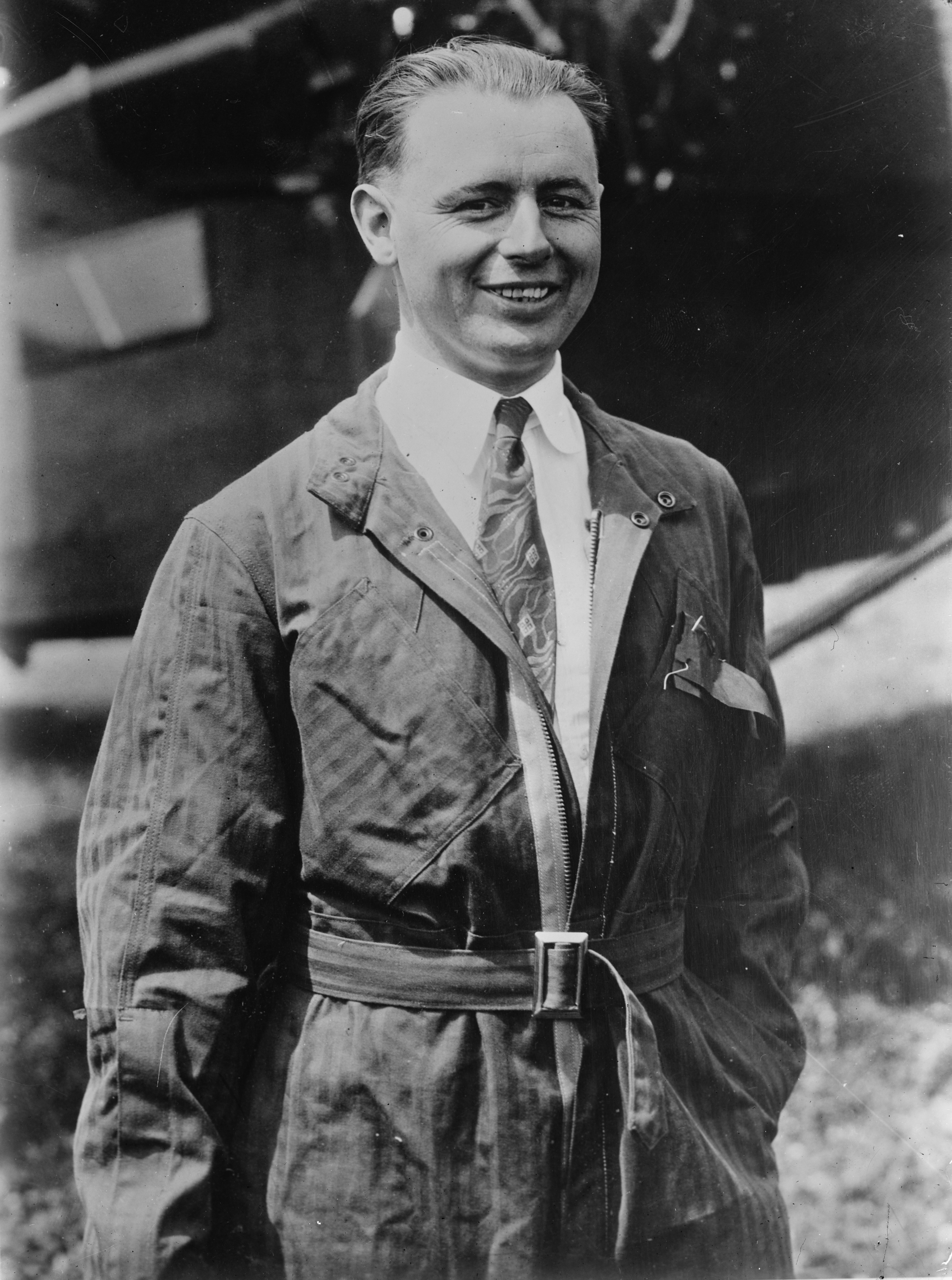
- Hegenberger in 1935
- Born: September 30, 1895; Boston, Massachusetts, U.S.
- Died: August 31, 1983 (aged 87); Goldenrod, Florida, U.S.
- Military career
- Allegiance: United States
- Branch: Aviation Section, Signal Corps; Air Service, United States Army; United States Army Air Corps; United States Army Air Forces; United States Air Force
- Service years: 1917–1949
- Rank: Major General
- Commands: II Bomber Command; Tenth Air Force; 1st Air Division
- Conflicts: World War II
- Awards: Distinguished Service Medal; Legion of Merit (2); Distinguished Flying Cross (2)

Albert Francis Hegenberger (September 30, 1895 – August 31, 1983) was a major general in the United States Air Force and a pioneering aviator who set a flight distance record with Lester J. Maitland, completing the first transpacific flight to Hawaii in 1927 as navigator of the Bird of Paradise. Hegenberger was an aeronautical engineer of note, earning both the Mackay Trophy (1927) and Collier Trophy (1934) for achievement. Hegenberger also invented the non-directional beacon, adopted for both military and civil use.

== Biography ==
=== Early years and World War I ===
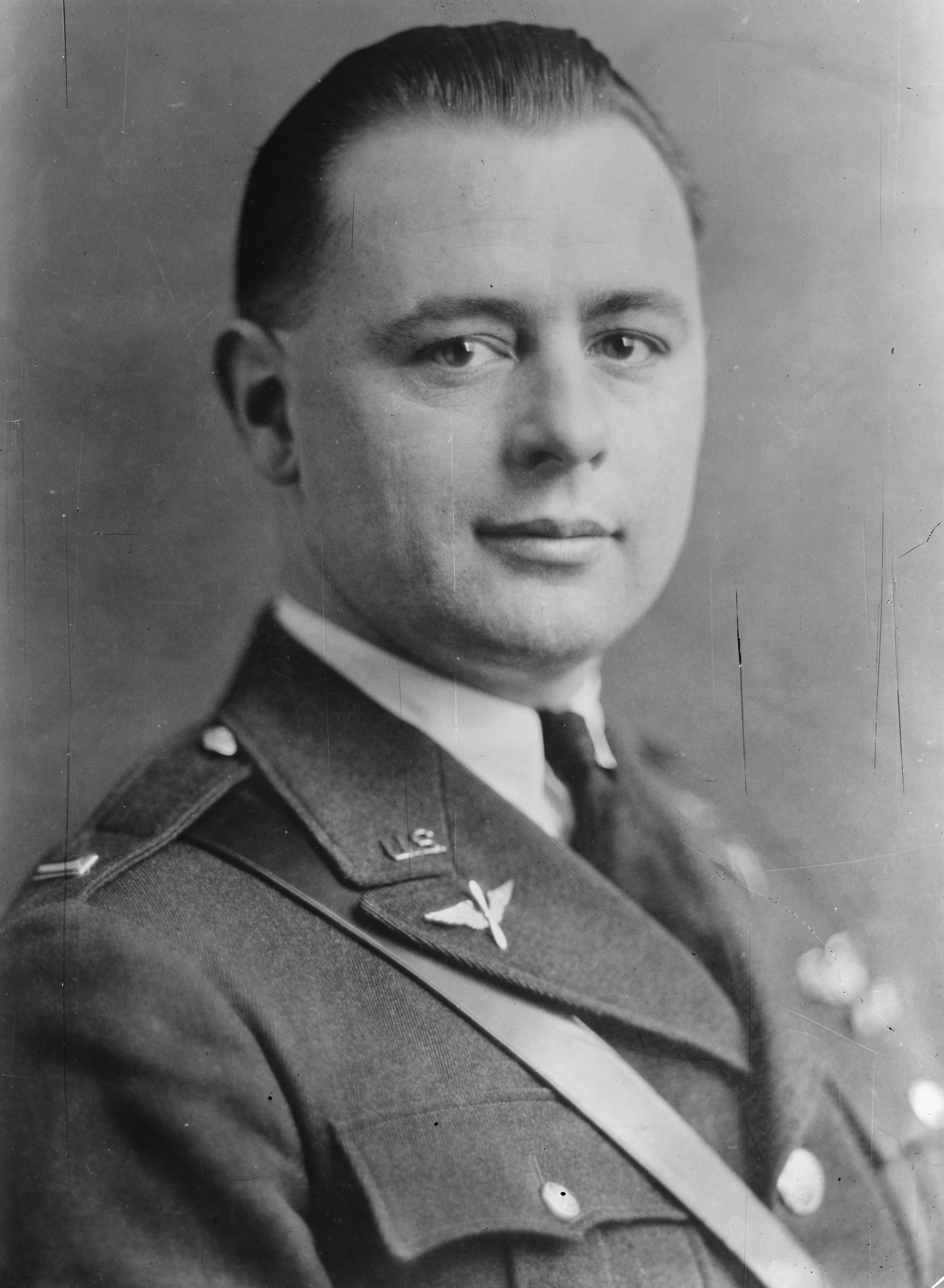
Lt. Albert Francis Hegenberger

Hegenberger was born at Boston, Massachusetts, in 1895. He entered the Massachusetts Institute of Technology in 1913 to undertake the course in civil engineering. When the United States entered World War I, Hegenberger enlisted in the Aviation Section, Signal Enlisted Reserve Corps as a private first class (flying cadet) on September 14, 1917. He completed ground school training at the school of military aeronautics at M.I.T. in December 1917, and proceeded to Ellington Field, Texas, where he earned a rating of Reserve Military Aviator. He was appointed a second lieutenant in the Signal Officer Reserve Corps on April 6, 1918. He was sent to the pilot pool at the Aviation Concentration Center at Camp John Dick, Dallas, Texas; then assigned successively to the School of Aerial Observers, Post Field, Fort Sill, Oklahoma; the School of Aerial Gunnery, Taliaferro Field, Texas, graduating as a gunnery pilot of July 5, 1918; and in October, 1918 back to M.I.T. for a four-month course in aeronautical engineering.

=== Air Service and Air Corps ===
Upon completing his technical training in February 1919, Hegenberger became chief of the Instrument Branch at McCook Field, Dayton, Ohio. He was commissioned a first lieutenant, Air Service, in the Regular Army July 1, 1920, and subsequently served as assistant engineer of the Equipment Section, Air Service Engineering Division. Hegenberger transferred overseas to the 72nd Bombardment Squadron at Luke Field, Hawaii, in October 1923, and later served as operations officer of the 5th Composite Group. In March 1925, he was transferred to the 5th's 23rd Bombardment Squadron.

Returning to the United States and McCook Field in October 1926, he became chief of the Equipment Branch, Materiel Division of the Army Air Corps. In July 1927, he was appointed chief of the Instrument and Navigation Unit at the Materiel Division's new facilities at Wright Field.

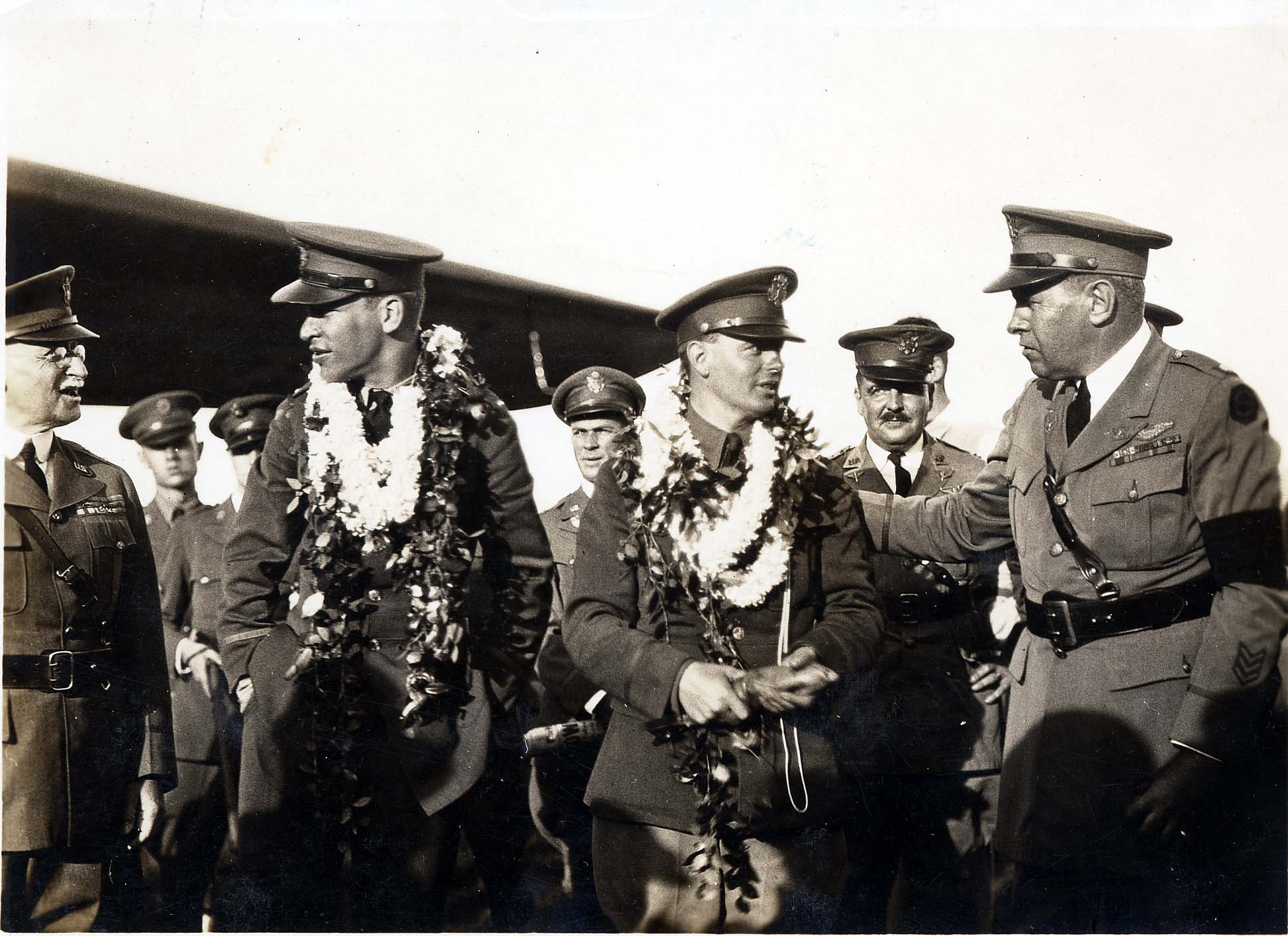
Bird of Paradise crewmen Lt. Lester J. Maitland and Hegenberger are congratulated after landing at Wheeler Field.

While stationed at McCook, he planned the first transpacific flight to Hawaii, then using his flight plan, flew the Bird of Paradise to Hawaii with 1st Lt. Lester J. Maitland on June 28–29, 1927, for which they won the Mackay Trophy. Resuming his work at Wright Field, Hegenberger developed the first blind flying landing system, (using non-directional and marker beacons) and on May 9, 1932, made the first complete solo blind flight from take-off to landing, for which he was presented the 1934 Collier Trophy on July 22, 1935, by President Franklin D. Roosevelt.

He joined the 30th Bombardment Squadron at Rockwell Field, San Diego, California, in August 1935, and was made squadron commander in October. He later moved with this unit to March Field, California, where he served until August 1937. Hegenberger was a student at the Air Corps Tactical School at Maxwell Field, Alabama from September 1937 to June 1938. He then moved on to Fort Leavenworth, Kansas, where he completed the Command and General Staff School in June 1939.

Hegenberger was assigned to Hickam Field, Hawaii, as operations officer of the 5th Bombardment Group in July 1939, and the following February became operations officer of the 18th Wing at Hickam Field. He moved to Fort Shafter, Hawaii, in November 1940 to become assistant chief of staff for operations of the Hawaiian Air Force, and in April 1941, was named commanding officer of the 11th Bombardment Group at Hickam Field.

=== World War II ===
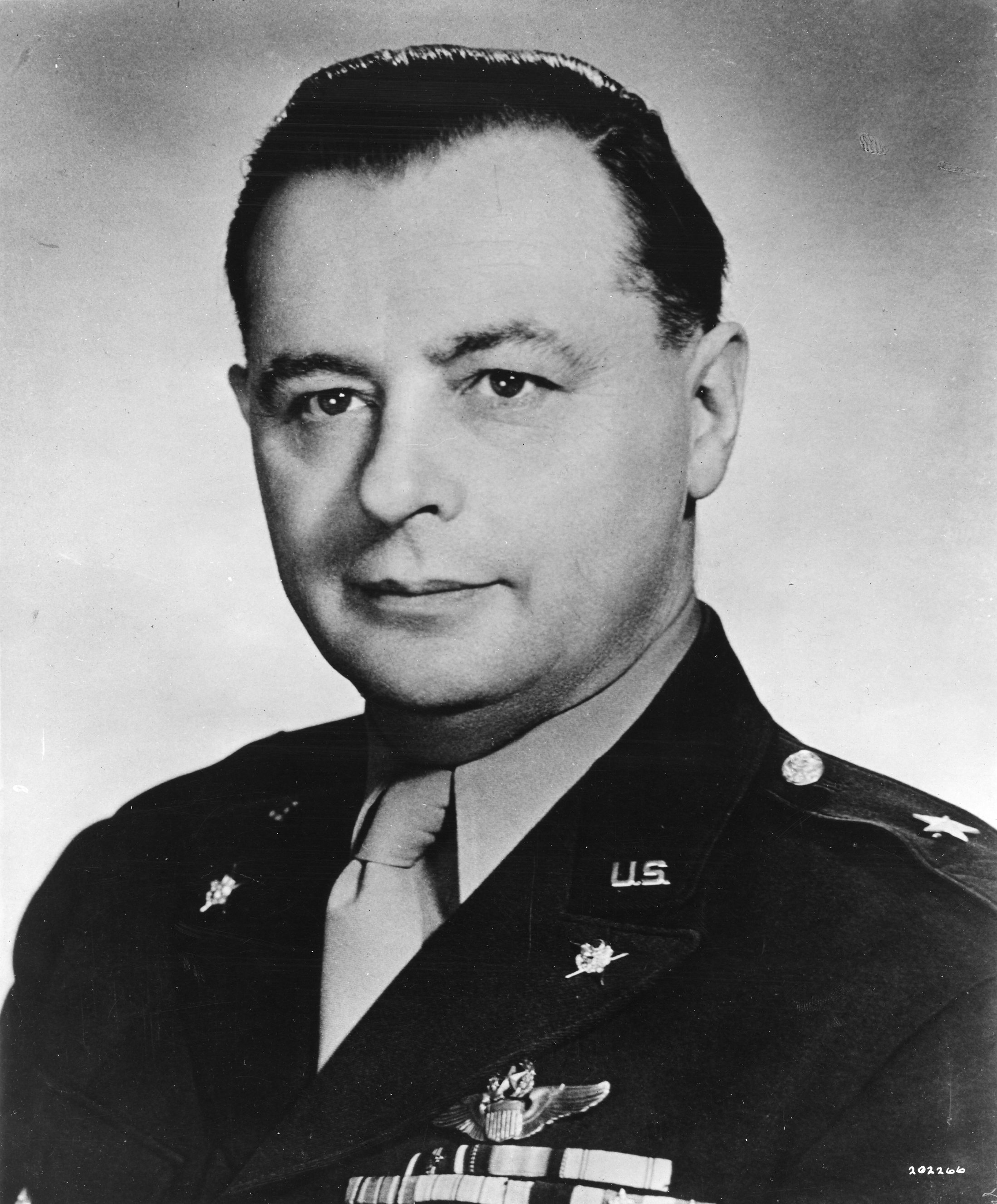
Brig. Gen. Albert F. Hegenberger

Hegenberger began World War II in command of the 18th Bombardment Wing at Hickam Field, and in January became chief of staff of the VII Bomber Command. From August to October 1942, he was assistant chief of staff for operations of the Second Air Force, and commanding officer of its II Bomber Command at Fort George Wright, Washington. In October 1942, he organized the 21st Bombardment Wing, a staging organization for heavy bombardment crews headed overseas, at Smoky Hill Army Air Base, Salina, Kansas, and commanded in until January 1944. In May 1943 he moved the wing to Topeka Army Air Base, Kansas. In January 1944, he was reassigned to Headquarters, Second Air Force, now at Colorado Springs, Colorado, as chief of staff. In January 1945, he was named chief of staff of the Fourteenth Air Force in the China Theater of Operations, and in August became commander of the Tenth Air Force in the same theater.

=== Postwar and service in the USAF ===
Returning to the United States in December 1945, he was assigned to Headquarters, Army Air Forces, for duty with the Officers Selection Committee. In July 1946, he went to Pacific Air Command (PACUSA) headquarters in Tokyo, Japan, and two months later became commanding general of the 1st Air Division on Okinawa.

He returned to the United States and the Pentagon in December 1947, with assignment to the office of the Deputy Chief of Staff—Materiel, Headquarters United States Air Force, for duty with the Special Weapons Group as assistant to Major Gen. William E. Kepner, Deputy Chief for Atomic Energy. On 1 July 1948, a reorganization moved the organization to the office of the Deputy Chief of Staff—Operations, and Hegenberger succeeded Kepner as chief of Special Weapons Group. In August 1948, under the Assistant For Atomic Energy, his position was retitled Chief, 1009th Special Weapons Squadron.

Hegenberger retired August 31, 1949. In 1958, he was recognized for his demonstration of the capability of four-course radio range beacons as a navigational aid by the Professional Group on Aeronautical and Navigational Electronics, a member of the Institute of Electrical and Electronics Engineers, receiving its annual Pioneer Award, and in 1976 was enshrined in the National Aviation Hall of Fame. He died of pneumonia in Goldenrod, Florida on August 31, 1983.

== Awards and decorations ==
SOURCE: Biographical Data on Air Force General Officers, 1917–1952, Volume 1 – A thru L

Command pilot

Distinguished Service Medal
Legion of Merit (with oak leaf cluster)
Distinguished Flying Cross (with oak leaf cluster)
World War I Victory Medal
American Defense Service Medal
American Campaign Medal
Asiatic-Pacific Campaign Medal (with three campaign stars)

World War II Victory Medal

Order of Cloud and Banner (Republic of China)

Order of the Crown of Italy (Grand Officer)

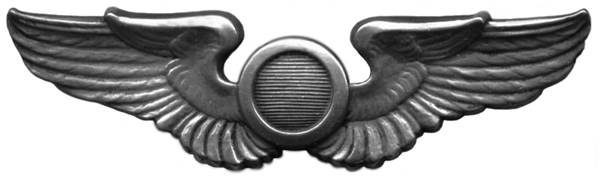
Combat Observer

Technical Observer

Hegenberger also received the 1927 Mackay Trophy, the 1934 Collier Trophy, and was a fellow of the Institute of Aeronautical Engineers. In 1976, Hegenberger was inducted into the National Aviation Hall of Fame in Dayton, Ohio.

Dates of promotion
Private first class, Signal Enlisted Reserve Corps, 14 September 1917
Second lieutenant, Signal Officers Reserve Corps; 6 April 1918
First lieutenant, Air Service; 1 July 1920
Captain, Air Corps; 3 January 1932
Major (temporary), 2 October 1935
Major, Air Corps; 15 August 1939
Lieutenant colonel (temporary), 30 December 1940
Lieutenant colonel, Air Corps; 18 December 1941
Colonel (temporary), 5 January 1942
Colonel, Army of the United States, 8 June 1942
Brigadier general (temporary), 18 September 1943
Major general (temporary), 7 September 1945
Brigadier general (permanent), 19 February 1948, with date of rank from 19 September 1943

== Legacy ==
Hegenberger Road and Hegenberger Expressway in Oakland, California, near the Oakland International Airport, are named after him.
