= Question Mark (aircraft) =

Early experimental aerial refueling aircraft

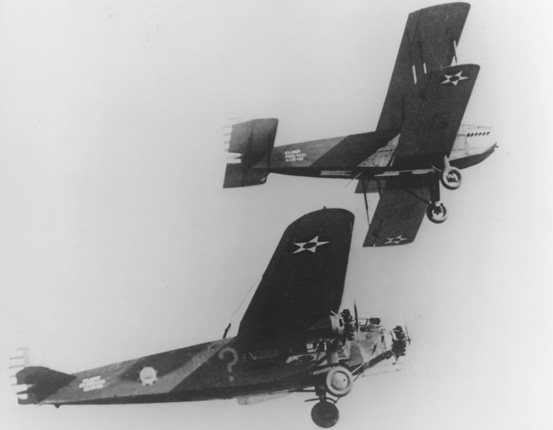
- Question Mark (below) being refuelled by a Douglas C-1 (above)

General information
- Type: Atlantic C-2A
- Manufacturer: Atlantic Aircraft Corporation
- Owners: United States Army Air Corps
- Serial: 28-120

History
- First flight: 1928
- In service: 1928–1932
- Fate: Converted to Atlantic C-7 in 1931 and scrapped at Randolph Field in 1934

Question Mark ("?") was a modified Atlantic-Fokker C-2A transport airplane of the United States Army Air Corps. In 1929, commanded by Major Carl A. Spaatz, it was flown for a flight endurance record as part of an experiment with aerial refueling. Question Mark established new world records in aviation for sustained flight (heavier-than-air), refueled flight, sustained flight (lighter-than-air), and distance between January 1 and January 7, 1929, in a nonstop flight of 151 hours near Los Angeles, California.

Following the record-setting demonstration, the C-2A was returned to transport duties. In 1931, more powerful engines replaced those used in the endurance flight and it was redesignated as a C-7 transport. The aircraft was damaged beyond economical repair in 1932, when it crash-landed in Texas after running out of fuel, and was scrapped.

The flight demonstrated the military application of the concept, but while it inspired numerous efforts to set even greater endurance records, development of a practical in-flight refueling system was largely ignored by the world's air forces before World War II. Civilian development of aerial refueling in Great Britain was more successful, but in the end, it, too, was disregarded. However, Spaatz, two decades after the flight of the Question Mark, became head of the United States Air Force and using the British system as a starting point, implemented in-flight refueling on a worldwide operational basis.

== Background ==
The first complete in-flight refueling between two aircraft took place on June 27, 1923, (Note: While they had passed minor amounts of fuel in practice, the June 27 flight was the first aerial refueling mission, an attempt to set an endurance mark.) when two Boeing-built de Havilland DH-4Bs of the United States Army Air Service accomplished the feat over San Diego's Rockwell Field. Subsequently, the same group of airmen established an endurance record of remaining aloft for more than 37 hours in August 1923, using nine aerial refuelings. In June 1928, a new endurance record of more than 61 hours was established in Belgium by Adjutant Louis Crooy and Sgt. Victor Groenen, also using aerial refueling.

Second Lt. Elwood R. Quesada, an engineer of the U.S. Army Air Corps stationed at Bolling Field in Washington, DC, nearly crashed from lack of fuel in April 1928 while participating in a long-range rescue mission to Labrador. Working with a U.S. Marine Corps aviator from Anacostia Naval Air Station, he devised a plan to break the Belgians' record using aerial refueling. (Note: According to the January 14, 1929 Time magazine, in addition to Crooy and Groenen's air-refueled record, an endurance record of 65 hours 31 minutes had been set in 1928 by a pair of Germans, Johann Risticz and Wilhelm Zimmerman, but they had not refueled during the flight.) Quesada submitted the plan to Capt. Ira C. Eaker, an aide to Assistant Secretary of War for Air F. Trubee Davison, who had also been on the April mission. Their mutual interest in air-to-air refueling led Eaker to forward it to Maj. Gen. James E. Fechet, Chief of the Air Corps. Both Fechet and Davison approved the project on the condition that it demonstrate a military application and not just as a publicity stunt. Overall command of the project was given to Major Carl A. Spaatz (Note: In 1929, the legal spelling of his name was "Spatz".) the Assistant G-3 for Training and Operations in Fechet's office, who was on orders to take command of the 7th Bombardment Group at Rockwell Field.

== Preparations ==
=== Aircraft modification ===
A new Atlantic-Fokker C-2A transport, serial number 28-120, was selected for the project. Assigned to the Air Corps Detachment, Bolling Field at Bolling Field, it was flown to Middletown Air Depot, Pennsylvania, for modifications. The C-2A was an American-built military version of the Fokker F.VIIa-3m Trimotor, a high-wing monoplane with a gross weight of 10,395 pounds (4,715 kg), re-engined with three Wright R-790 motors producing 220 horsepower (160 kW) each. A C-2 variant nicknamed the Bird of Paradise had made the first transpacific flight to Hawaii the year before and proven the capability of the design. The C-2A had an internal fuel capacity of 192-US-gallon (730 L) in a pair of wing tanks, and for the project, two 150-US-gallon (570 L) tanks were installed in the cargo cabin. A hatch was cut in the roof of the C-2 behind the wing for transfer of the fuel hose and passage of supplies from the tanker to the receiver. The 72-octane aviation gasoline would be received in 100-US-gallon (380 L) increments of about 90 seconds' duration.

A 45-US-gallon (170 L) tank was used to provide engine oil to the three motors, replenished by in-flight deliveries of 5-US-gallon (19 L) cans of Pennzoil triple-extra-heavy lowered on slings. A copper tubing system was installed in an attempt to adequately lubricate the rocker arms of the engines in-flight. Doorways were cut on each side of the cockpit and catwalks built on the wings to enable mechanic Roy Hooe to access the engines for emergency maintenance. To reduce propeller noise, the two wing engines were mounted with Westinghouse twin-blade Micarta propellers, while the nose engine used a Standard three-blade steel propeller.

As word of the project spread, its members were continually being asked how long they expected to remain aloft. Their responses were generally to the effect: "That is the question." A large question mark was painted on each side of the fuselage to provoke interest in the endurance flight, prompting the nickname of the plane.

To deliver the fuel, two Douglas C-1 single-engine transports were also modified, s/n 25-428 designated "Refueling Airplane No. 1" and s/n 25-432 as "Refueling Airplane No. 2". The biplane C-1s were evolved from the Douglas World Cruiser design, with the pilots side-by-side in an open cockpit forward of the wing. Two 150-US-gallon (570 L) tanks were installed in their cargo compartments, attached to a lead-weighted 50-foot (15 m) length of 2.5-inch (64 mm) fire hose. The nozzle of the hose had a quick-closing valve on the tanker's end and was tightly wrapped with copper wire, one end of which could be attached to a corresponding copper plate mounted in Question Mark to ground the hose. The C-1s would each carry a third crewman in the cargo compartment to reel out the hose, lower a supply rope, and work the shutoff valve.

=== Planning ===
The operation was scheduled to begin Tuesday, January 1, 1929, at Los Angeles, California, to take advantage of weather conditions and to generate publicity while refueling by overflying the 1929 Rose Bowl football game played that day in Pasadena. The refueling planes were based at each end of a 110-mi-long racetrack oval flight path, one at Rockwell Field and the other at the Metropolitan Airport, now Van Nuys Airport. The flight would originate and terminate there for any endurance record to be officially recognized by the Fédération Aéronautique Internationale.

Van Nuys was chosen over an existing dirt-strip airfield, Mines Field, located at El Segundo, because the weather in Van Nuys was considered more reliable and predictable, particularly in regard to temperature inversions and smog. Metropolitan was also an operational facility, while Mines Field had just been procured by the City of Los Angeles for use as a commercial airport. The project arrived there in December 1928 to begin preparations for the flight, with Capt. Hugh M. Elmendorf in charge of logistics and maintenance.

Because of weight considerations and the unreliability of radios, none was installed in the Question Mark. All communications between the aircraft or between Question Mark and the ground had to be accomplished using flags, flares, flashlights, weighted message bags, notes tied to the supply lines, or messages written in chalk on the fuselages of PW-9D fighters, painted black and nicknamed "blackboard planes". (One such message written on the side of a 95th Pursuit Squadron is externally linked below.) (Note: The first message delivered by chalked message was: "Don't forget Rose Bowl". (Maurer, p. 263))

== Six days in the air ==
=== Crews ===
The crew of Question Mark consisted of Spaatz, Eaker, Quesada, 1st Lt. Harry A. Halverson, and Sgt. Roy W. Hooe. Refueling Airplane No. 1 (at Rockwell) was crewed by pilots Capt. Ross G. Hoyt and 1st Lt. Auby C. Strickland, with 2nd Lt. Irwin A. Woodring reeling the hose. Refueling Airplane No. 2 (at Van Nuys) was crewed by pilots 1st Lt. Odas Moon and 2nd Lt. Joseph G. Hopkins, and hose handler 2nd Lt. Andrew F. Solter.

Four pilots of the 95th Pursuit Squadron, based at Rockwell Field, flew the PW-9 "blackboard planes": 1st Lts. Archie F. Roth, and Homer W. Kiefer, and 2nd Lts. Norman H. Ives, and Roger V. Williams.

=== Takeoff and refueling ===
Question Mark took off from Van Nuys at 7:26 am on New Year's Day 1929 with Eaker at the controls, carrying only 100 US gallons (380 L) of fuel to save takeoff weight. Aboard the Question Mark, either Halverson or Quesada did most of the piloting during cruising flight while Eaker monitored the throttles for smoothest engine performance. A log was kept by the flight officer (co-pilot) and dropped to the ground daily, and Eaker was responsible for winding the barograph, an instrument that continuously recorded altitude and time as documentary evidence for the records.

Less than an hour later, Moon completed the first refueling over Van Nuys. During refuelings, Eaker and Halverson manned the controls, Spaatz and Quesada supervised the fuel exchange, and Hooe operated a "wobble" pump. The C-1 approached the Question Mark from above and behind, maintaining 20 to 30 feet (9.1 m) of vertical separation, until in a position slightly ahead of the C-2. Both aircraft stabilized in level flight at 80 mph (130 km/h) and the hose was reeled out. Spaatz climbed on a platform below the open hatch, and wearing rain gear and goggles for protection against fuel spills, grounded the hose and then placed it in a receptacle mounted in the upper fuselage.

Made from a bucket with a sloped floor, the receptacle had connections to the two extra fuel tanks, and at Spaatz's signal, Solter opened the valve. Fuel flowed by gravity into the bucket at 75 US gallons (280 L) per minute and then into the tanks, where it was then pumped by hand into the wing tanks by Hooe. Food, mail, tools, spare parts, and other supplies were also passed by rope in the same fashion.

=== Sustaining flight ===
The five men aboard Question Mark underwent medical examinations before the flight, and their flight surgeon planned a special diet. However, an electric stove to heat food was eliminated to save weight, and hot meals were sent aloft by the refuelers, including a turkey dinner on New Years Day prepared by a church in Van Nuys. The crew warded off boredom by reading, playing cards, sleeping in bunks mounted over the fuel tanks, and writing letters. After the existing endurance record was surpassed on Thursday evening, January 3, the support crew sent up cheese, figs, olives, and five jars of caviar for an in-flight celebration. (Note: On the other hand, when Spaatz's wife Ruth pointed out the aircraft passing overhead to their seven-year-old daughter Tattie after it had set the new record, rather than being impressed, the child reportedly said, "I think it's kind of dumb." (Davis, p. 22))

During a refueling, (Note: Bakse (p. 53, quoting Eaker) and Davis place this incident while the Question Mark was refueling over the Rose Bowl game on the afternoon of January 1. Boyne (p. 70) and Maurer (p. 262), using the flight record, place it just after midnight January 2.) Spaatz was drenched with fuel when turbulence caused the hose to pull out of the receptacle. Recalling the event in 1975, Eaker said:

We went over the Rose Bowl. It was very bumpy, as you can appreciate, as we should have appreciated, up against those mountains in January, and the refueling plane and the Question Mark were torn apart. I was piloting the Question Mark and I realized that General Spaatz had probably been drenched in high-octane gasoline.

Quesada was at the controls and flew the aircraft over the ocean for calmer air. Fearing that chemical burns from the gasoline might force him to parachute from the airplane to seek medical treatment, Spaatz ordered Eaker to continue the flight regardless. However, Spaatz shed all his clothing and was wiped off with oil-soaked rags. Although he directed at least one refueling without his clothing, replacements were soon delivered. Quesada was briefly overcome by the same accident, but quickly revived. Spaatz experienced two other fuel spills without injury, using oil to wipe his skin and zinc oxide to protect his eyes.

Fog, turbulence, and darkness altered the refueling schedule, shortening some contacts and delaying others. On six occasions, the Question Mark was forced away from its flight track to refuel, once over Oceanside and five times over El Centro. Maintaining contact formation became more difficult as the weight of the planes changed during transfer, especially since the refueling pilot could not observe the Question Mark. On January 4, after the aircraft rendezvoused over the Imperial Valley, both nearly impacted the ground when they encountered an unexpected air pocket while refueling. Hoyt developed a system whereby Woodring tugged on a string tied to the pilot's arm if the C-1's speed was excessive. Early in the flight, a window blew out of the C-2's cabin, but a replacement was eventually hauled up and installed by Hooe. A leak in a fuel line was repaired using a mixture of red lead, soap, and shellac hauled up by tanker.

=== End of the flight ===
Although the crew flew the plane at slow cruising speeds to nurse the engines, they were eventually overstressed from extended use. The left engine began losing power as early as the third day. Hooe taped down his trouser cuffs, donned a parachute, and rigged a lifeline to service the engines from the makeshift catwalks, but the in-flight lubricating systems only delayed and could not prevent engine wear. Once the cylinders began missing, the Question Mark shortened its loops to remain within gliding distance of Van Nuys. Eaker was able to clear fouled spark plugs by completely opening the throttles.

On the afternoon of Monday, January 7, the left wing engine quit. Hooe went out on the catwalk to attempt repairs, immobilizing the windmilling propeller with a rubber hook. Eaker increased throttle on the remaining two engines to maintain flight while repairs were attempted, but they, too, began to strain. The plane lost altitude from 5,000 to 2,550 feet (780 m) before Hooe was called back inside and the decision made to land.

The Question Mark landed under power at Metropolitan Airport at 2:06 pm, 150 hours, 40 minutes, and 14 seconds after takeoff. The left engine had seized because of a pushrod failure, and the others both suffered severe rocker arm wear.

== Results ==
Refueled 37 times and resupplied six others, with 12 of the 43 replenishments taking place at night, the Question Mark took on 5,660 US gallons (21,400 L) of fuel, 245 US gallons (930 L) of oil, and supplies of food and water for its five-man crew. Hoyt and Refueling Airplane No. 1, flying from Rockwell and a backup airport at Imperial, California, resupplied Question Mark a total of 27 times (10 at night), while Moon's crew at Van Nuys flew 16 sorties, two at night. In all, the flight broke existing world records for sustained flight (heavier-than-air), refueled flight, sustained flight (lighter-than-air), and distance.

All five crew members were decorated with the Distinguished Flying Cross at a ceremony held at Bolling Field on January 29. (Note: Meal vouchers submitted to the War Department for the cost of food during the flight were instead forwarded to the Comptroller General, who refused payment on the grounds that none of the circumstances encountered obligated the United States to pay for their subsistence. (Davis, p. 23)) The crews of the tankers, though, went unrecognized. Eventually, all six received letters of commendation for their participation, but only 47 years later was their vital role in the operation recognized with decorations. By then, only Hoyt and Hopkins remained living, but both personally received Distinguished Flying Crosses on May 26, 1976.

== Follow-up efforts ==
Eaker was involved in a second attempt at aerial refueling in September 1929. Piloting a Boeing Model 95 mail plane nicknamed the Boeing Hornet Shuttle on a transcontinental endurance flight eastbound from Oakland, California, he was refueled in flight by C-1s and Boeing Model 40 aircraft. Over Cleveland, Ohio, a Boeing refueling crew accidentally dropped a five-gallon can of oil through his wing, ending the first attempt. On a second attempt westbound, his engine quit over Utah when dirt clogged the fuel line, forcing him to crash land in the mountains near Salt Lake City.

The flight of the Question Mark inspired a rash of projects to break the endurance record. In 1929 alone, 40 flights were attempted, all by civilians, and nine succeeded in surpassing Question Mark's record. At the end of 1929, the record stood at over 420 hours, established by Dale "Red" Jackson and Forest E. "Obie" O'Brine in the Curtiss Robin Greater St. Louis.

The Air Corps followed up the flight of the Question Mark with a mission to demonstrate its applicability in combat. On May 21, 1929, during annual maneuvers, a Keystone LB-7 piloted by Moon took off from Fairfield Air Depot in Dayton, Ohio, on a simulated mission to New York City via Washington, DC. Plans were for the bomber to be refueled in flight several times, drop a flash bomb over New York harbor, then return to Dayton nonstop, again by way of Washington. Moon had 1st Lt. John Paul Richter, a hose handler on the first aerial refueling mission in 1923, as a member of his five-man crew. The C-1 tanker employed to refuel the LB-7 was flown by Hoyt and two enlisted men. While attempting an air refueling en route from Dayton to Washington, icing forced the tanker to land in Uniontown, Pennsylvania, where it got stuck in mud. After flying to New York, the LB-7 was forced to land at Bolling Field. The next day, the tanker joined the bomber and both flew to New York, where they made a public demonstration of air refueling and four dry runs.

== Legacy ==
Of the 16 Army aviators involved in the project, six later became general officers. Spaatz, Eaker, and Quesada played important roles in the US Army Air Forces during World War II. Spaatz rose to commanding general of the Army Air Forces and became the first Chief of Staff of the United States Air Force. Eaker commanded the Eighth and Mediterranean Allied Air Forces. Quesada commanded the IX Tactical Air Command in France. Strickland, Hoyt, and Hopkins all became brigadier generals in the United States Air Force and the Brigadier General Ross G. Hoyt Award is issued annually for the best air refueling crew in the Air Force. Halverson, though he rose only to colonel, led the HAL-PRO ("Halverson Project") detachment, 12 Consolidated B-24 Liberators that bombed the Ploiești oil refineries in 1942, and became the first commander of the Tenth Air Force.

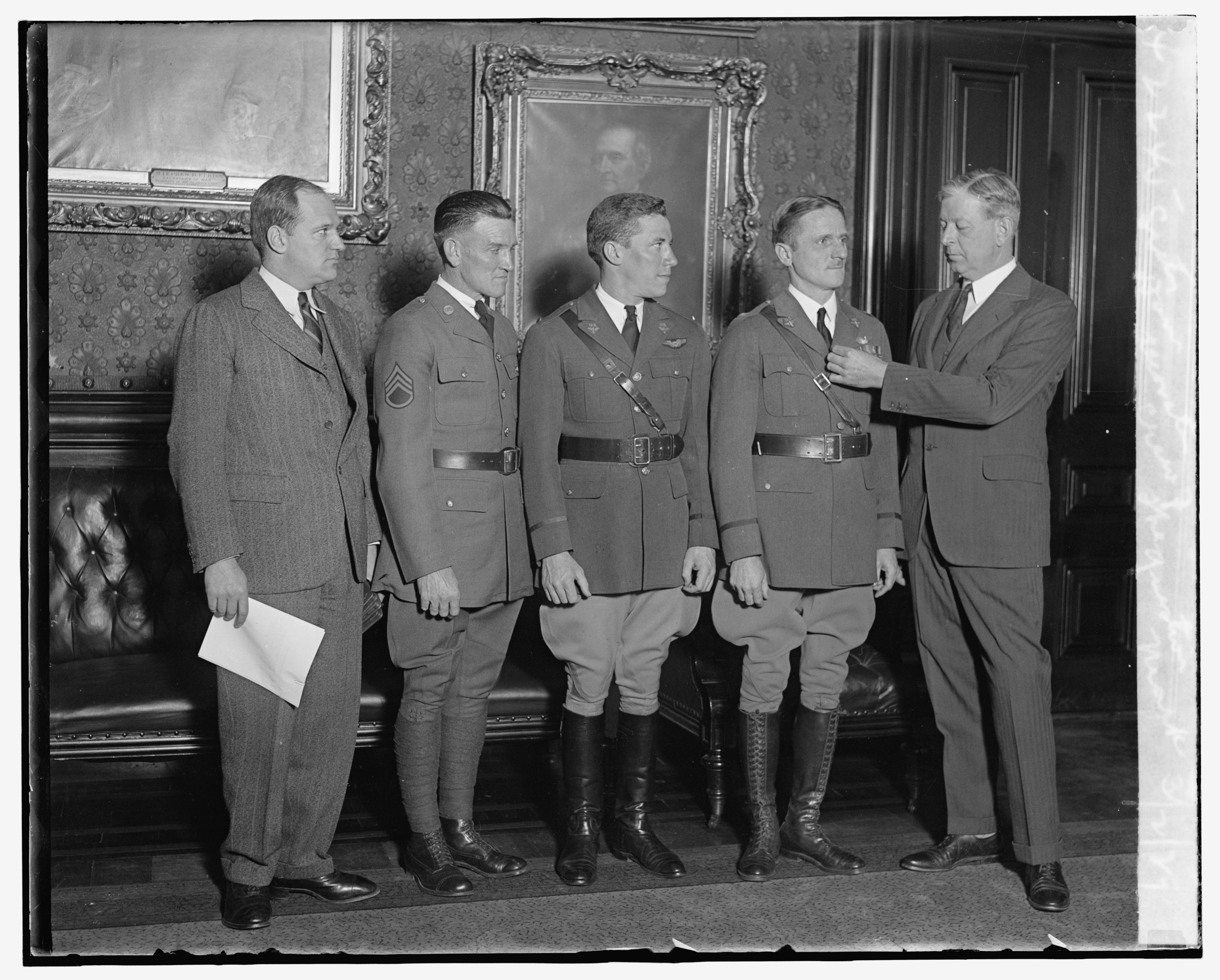
The crew being decorated

Moon, a bomber pilot, became an influential member of the "Bomber Mafia" at the Air Corps Tactical School from 1933 to 1936, but died on November 19, 1937, awaiting retirement from the service at the age of 45. Solter, a pursuit pilot, was killed in an accident flight testing an all-metal trainer at Randolph Field, Texas, in September 1936. Elmendorf, while not having a flying role in the project, was an accomplished test pilot and was killed on January 13, 1933, testing the Y1P-25 at Wright Field, Ohio. Elmendorf Air Force Base was named in his memory.

The Question Mark was refitted with 300 horsepower (220 kW) Wright R-975 engines in 1931, and in the practice of the day was redesignated a "C-7". It finished its service life as a transport airplane, first for the 22nd Observation Squadron at Pope Field, North Carolina, and then with the 47th School Squadron at Randolph Field, Texas. Ironically, its operational life came to an end when it ran out of fuel in flight on November 3, 1932. The aircraft was severely damaged trying to land at Davenport Auxiliary Field, 4 miles (6.4 km) north of the base, (Note: Flying the transport at the time of the crash was a veteran enlisted pilot, M/Sgt. Ezra F. Nendell.) and was surveyed (scrapped) in 1934. A major component of the refueling device is in the collections of the Historical Society of Berks County in Reading, Pennsylvania.

Of its military potential, historian Richard Davis wrote in a biography of Spaatz: "Perceptive observers noted that if Spaatz and his crew could man a craft that long, so could bomber crews." In his report to Fechet, Spaatz concluded that aerial refueling was both safe and practical, and that for bombardment operations it made the potential radius of action of a bomber almost unlimited while allowing it to carry heavier bomb loads because the weight of fuel at takeoff could be reduced. However, neither the War Department nor the Air Corps showed any further interest in the concept. As a result, the only immediate effect of the flight was to start a craze among aviators that one official USAF history characterized as "aeronautical flagpole sitting." (Note: The craze lasted six years without producing significant advancements in aircraft engineering. The record for a single continuous flight, lasting 27 days in the summer of 1935, was established by the Key brothers in a Curtiss Robin nicknamed the Ole Miss. The tanker, also a Curtiss Robin, made 113 takeoffs and 484 fuel transfers. Their record has gone unchallenged and the Ole Miss was placed on display at the National Air and Space Museum. (Smith, pp. 8–9))

The flight of the Question Mark did spark an interest in aerial refueling by the Royal Air Force, seeking to minimize takeoff weights of its bombers and reduce wear-and-tear on its grass airfields, but after a series of experiments between 1930 and 1937, they abandoned testing. The development of better engines, variable-pitch propellers and all-metal low-wing monoplanes capable of greater range deferred further military interest in aerial refueling, but when the next war turned out to be global in scale, also resulted in lack of capability for many ferrying, antisubmarine, and bombardment operations requiring extended range.

In 1934, Sir Alan Cobham founded Flight Refuelling Ltd (FRL), and by 1938 used a "looped-hose" system similar in design principle to that of the Question Mark to refuel large aircraft. In 1939, trials to perform aerial refueling of Short Empire flying boats began, but were suspended after 16 flights following the outbreak of World War II. Near the end of the war, Avro Lincolns of RAF Tiger Force were to have been in-flight refueled by Avro Lancasters fitted with looped-hose systems for long-range bombing operations against Japan, but the capture of Okinawa obviated fielding of the tanker force. British Overseas Airways Corporation attempted to revive Cobham's concept following the end of the war, but became disenchanted with the process. (Note: Trials were run under the auspices of BOAC and its fellow nationalized airline British South American Airways in the winter of 1946–1947. They were on the whole successful, but BOAC was much more interested in investing in Lockheed Constellations and Boeing Stratocruisers, which already had the range for Trans-Atlantic passenger operations, than in aerial refueling, in which some of its crews were reluctant to engage. (Smith, pp. 17–18))

In January 1948, 19 years after he commanded the Question Mark project, USAF Chief of Staff Spaatz made aerial refueling the Air Force's top strategic priority. In March, the service purchased two sets of FRL looped-hose equipment and manufacturing rights to the system. Flight testing of the equipment in two Boeing B-29 Superfortresses began in May with such success that in June, the decision was made to retrofit all of its first-line B-50 bombers with aerial refueling equipment. The world's first two dedicated air refueling units, the 43rd and 509th Air Refueling Squadrons, were constituted on June 30 and became operational in January 1949. With the development in 1948 of a "flying boom" delivery system, followed in 1949 by the "probe-and-drogue" system, in-flight refueling of fighter aircraft using single-point receiving equipment also became practical and USAF committed itself to the concept for the bulk of its future combat aircraft.

== See also ==
- Bird of Paradise
- Miss Veedol

== Notes ==
Footnotes

Citations
