= Douglas C-1 =

US Army Air Service cargo aircraft

C-1
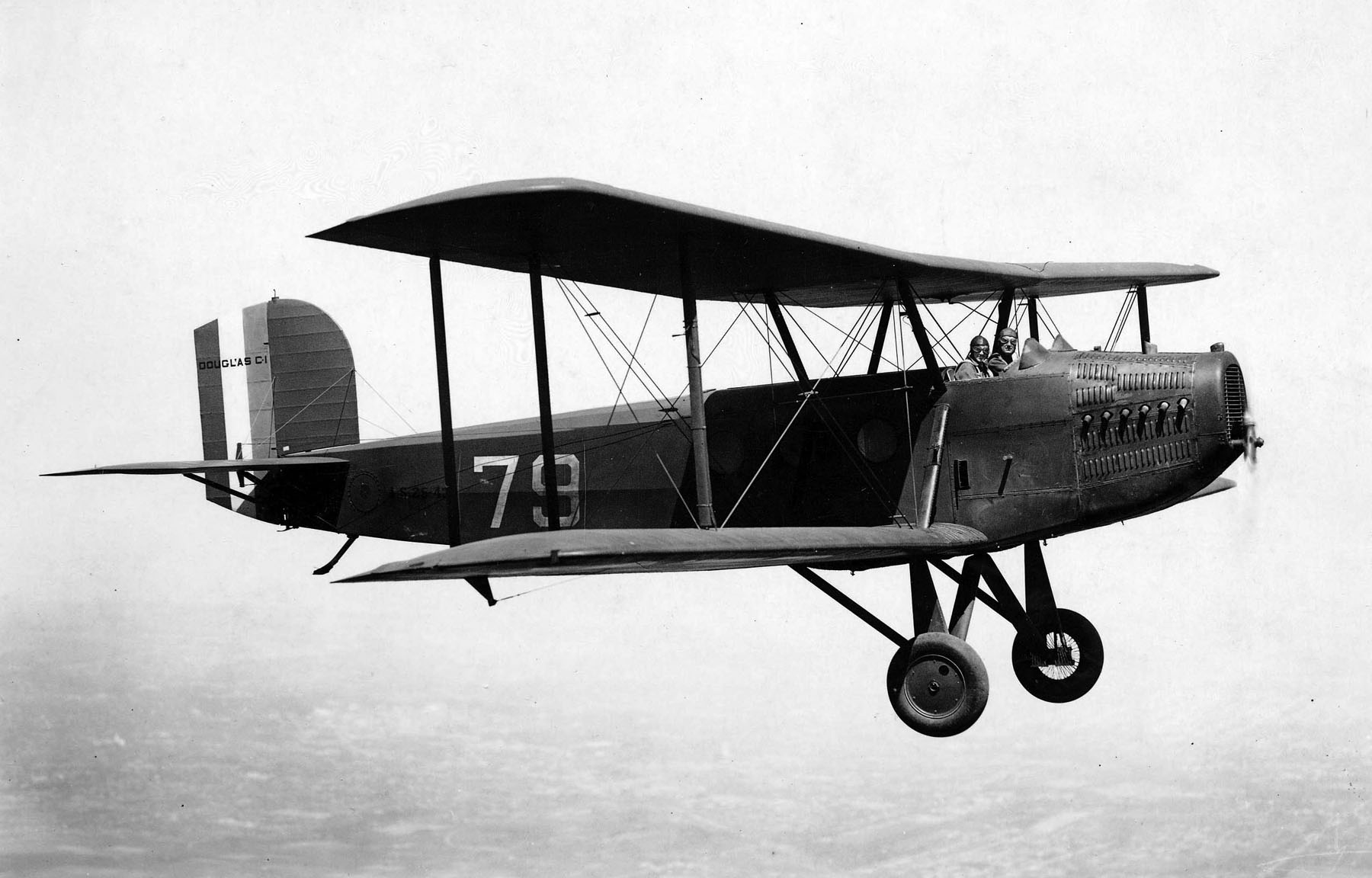

General information
- Type: Transport
- National origin: United States
- Manufacturer: Douglas Aircraft Company
- Primary user: United States Army Air Service
- Number built: 26

History
- Introduction date: 1925
- First flight: 2 May 1925

The Douglas C-1 was a cargo/transport aircraft produced by the Douglas Aircraft Corporation for the United States Army Air Service starting in 1925.

== Design and development ==
Douglas received an order for nine single-engined transport aircraft in 1925, the first aircraft flying from Douglas's Santa Monica, California factory on 2 May 1925. The C-1 was the first aircraft assigned in the new C- category. The aircraft design was based on several earlier and similar designs developed by Douglas in the early 1920s (including the Douglas World Cruisers used in the first round-the-world flight in 1924). The C-1 featured an enclosed passenger compartment capable of carrying six passengers or about 2,500 lb (1,100 kg) of cargo. A trap door was placed in the lower fuselage to allow large and/or heavy cargo (particularly aircraft engines) to be lifted directly into the cargo compartment. An auxiliary door for passengers and light cargo was included on the right side of the center fuselage.

== Operational history ==
The C-1 biplane was powered by the Liberty L-12 engine and carried a crew of two in an open cockpit. A C-1 was flown in the 1926 Ford National Reliability Air Tour.

Seventeen additional aircraft were ordered in 1926 and 1927 for the United States Army Air Corps as C-1Cs and were slightly larger than the original C-1s.

Several C-1s were used in test programs—as an engine testbed, as a prototype air ambulance and as refueling aircraft for early air-to-air refueling experiments. Two of these aircraft were used as "tankers" in the 1929 record endurance flight of the Fokker C-2 Question Mark.

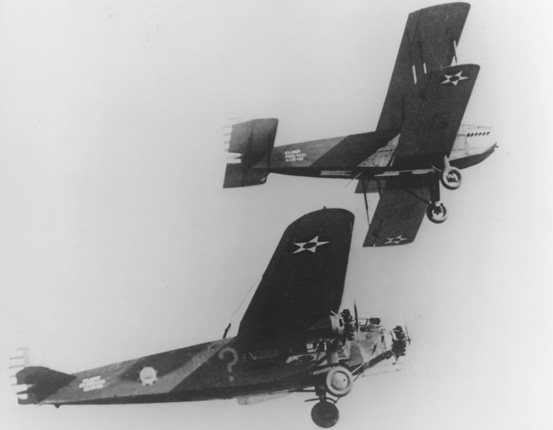
A Douglas C-1 (top) refueling the Question Mark (bottom).

== Variants ==
C-1
Single-engined cargo/passenger transport aircraft, powered by a 435 hp (324 kW) Liberty V-1650-1 piston engine, accommodation for two crew and six to eight passengers.
C-1A
One C-1 used to test a variety of engines and cowlings, it was also used for number of experiments with ski landing gear.
C-1C
Single-engined cargo/passenger transport aircraft, fitted with a metal cabin floor, modified landing gear, it had a higher gross landing weight and increased dimensions, plus a new balanced rudder; 17 built

== Operators ==
United States

- United States Army Air Service
- United States Army Air Corps

== Specifications (Douglas C-1) ==
Data from McDonnell Douglas aircraft since 1920 : Volume I

General characteristics

- Crew: 2
- Capacity: 6 or 8 pax / 2,500 lb (1,100 kg) payload
- Length: 35 ft 4 in (10.77 m)
- Wingspan: 56 ft 7 in (17.25 m)
- Height: 14 ft (4.3 m)
- Wing area: 805 sq ft (74.8 m^{2})
- Airfoil: Clark Y
- Empty weight: 3,836 lb (1,740 kg)
- Gross weight: 6,443 lb (2,922 kg)
- Powerplant: 1 × Liberty V-1650-1 V-12 water-cooled piston engine, 435 hp (324 kW)
- Propellers: 2-bladed fixed-pitch propeller

Performance

- Maximum speed: 116 mph (187 km/h, 101 kn) at sea level
- Cruise speed: 85 mph (137 km/h, 74 kn)
- Range: 385 mi (620 km, 335 nmi)
- Service ceiling: 14,850 ft (4,530 m)
- Rate of climb: 645 ft/min (3.28 m/s)
- Wing loading: 8 lb/sq ft (39 kg/m^{2})
- Power/mass: 0.0676 hp/lb (0.1111 kW/kg)
