= William P. MacCracken Jr. =

American politician (1888–1969)

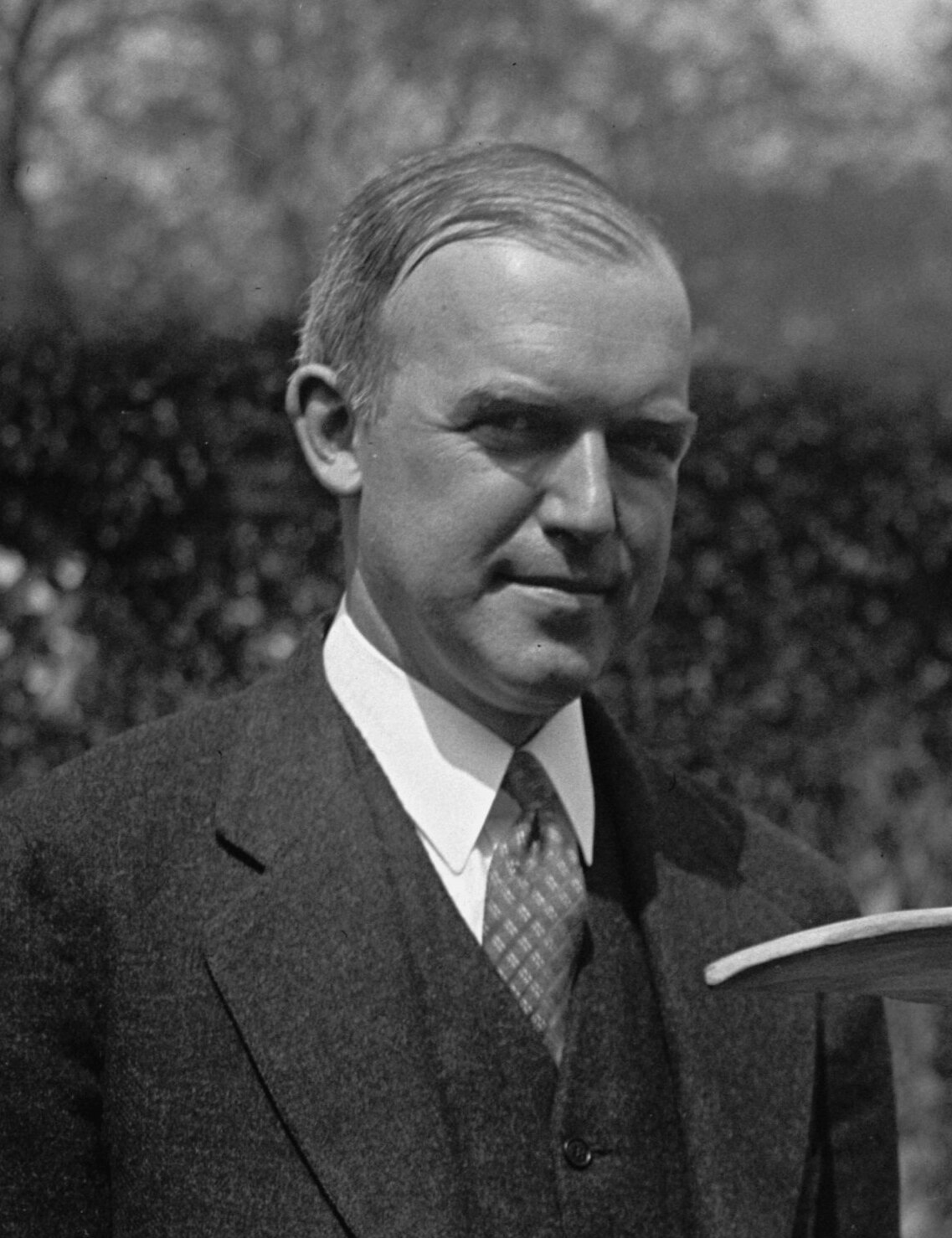
- MacCracken, 1929

Personal details
- Born: William Patterson MacCracken Jr. September 17, 1888 Chicago, Illinois, U.S.
- Died: September 20, 1969 (aged 81) Washington, D.C., U.S.
- Education: University of Chicago (JD)
- Occupation: Politician; lawyer

William Patterson MacCracken Jr. (September 17, 1888 - September 20, 1969) was the first U.S. assistant secretary of commerce for aeronautics. His department was awarded the Collier Trophy of 1928 for its contribution to the "development of airways and air navigation facilities". Later he was convicted of contempt of congress in the Air Mail scandal in 1934.

== Biography ==
MacCracken was born in Chicago, Illinois, September 17, 1888, to William P. MacCracken and Mary Elizabeth Avery (MacCracken). He studied law at the University of Chicago and earned a Doctor of Jurisprudence in 1911. His practice in Chicago was interrupted by his service as a flight instructor in the Air Service during World War I. He married Sally Lucille Lewis on September 14, 1918. From 1922 to 26 he was a member of the board of governors of the National Aeronautic Association, and from 1920 to 1938 he was a member of the National Advisory Committee for Aeronautics.

MacCracken entered public service as assistant Attorney General of Illinois in 1923, and the following year assistant State's Attorney for Cook County. MacCracken became the first federal regulator of commercial aviation when then-secretary of commerce Herbert Hoover named him the first assistant secretary of commerce for aeronautics in 1926. He appointed Louis H. Bauer as the first medical director of the Aeronautics Branch. In 1927, he received the first federal pilot's license.

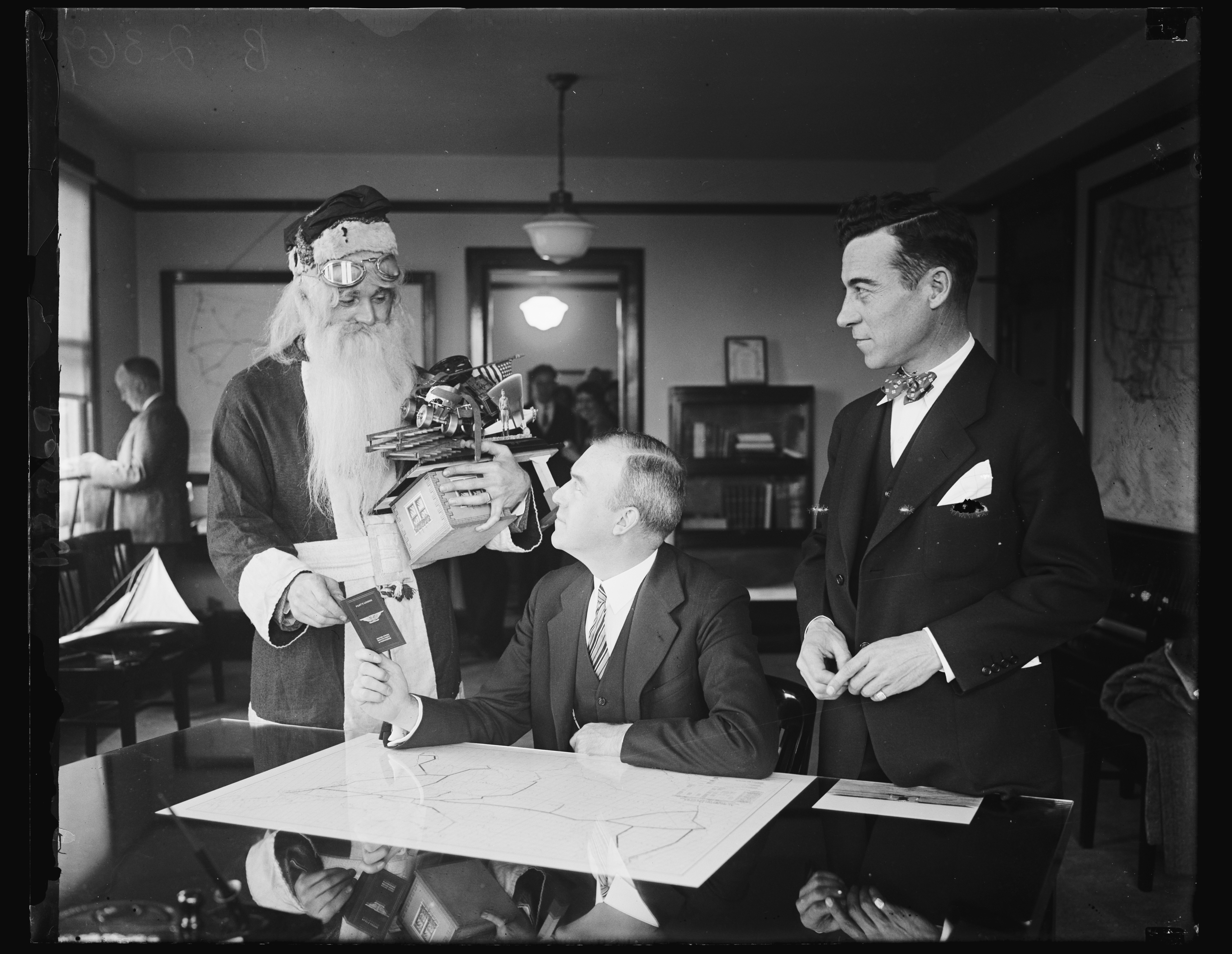
Santa Claus receives aeroplane pilot's license from Assistant Secretary of Commerce. William P. MacCracken, with Clarence M. Young (right). 1927

In 1929, he helped to draft key safety standards and regulations that became part of the 1930 Air Mail Act. MacCracken then returned to his private law practice, where he continued to be involved in the growth of commercial aviation by representing many major airlines. For that reason Postmaster General Walter F. Brown asked him to preside over what was later described as the Spoils Conference, to work out an agreement between the carriers and the Post office to consolidate air mail routes into transcontinental networks operated by the best-equipped and financially stable companies. This relationship left both exposed to charges of favoritism.

Fulton Lewis had collected material indicating collusion of the airlines, and Senator Hugo Black used Lewis' research as he began his investigation into impropriety.

MacCracken had a long experience in the legal aspects of flying and had built a thriving law practice representing aviation clients. He also had close ties to Hoover and Brown and had chaired the 1930 spoils conference. Not surprisingly the Black committee subpoenaed his documents. MacCracken refused to comply, pleading the confidentiality of the lawyer-client relationship... MacCracken may have been motivated by a sense of ethics, but his own actions and those of his associates deeply compromised him. With the files still under subpoena, MacCracken and Gilbert Givvin, a secretary to Transcontinental and Western Air president Harris Hanshue, removed several items and mailed them to Hanshue. Another MacCracken client, L. H. Brittin of Northwest Airways, secured permission from MacCracken’s law partner to remove approximately half a dozen letters Brittin considered personal. He then returned to his own office, tore the letters to pieces, and threw the fragments into the wastebasket...the attorney and his associates were summoned before the senate on contempt charges...With the other three defendants appearing before the senate as ordered, MacCracken went into hiding...After brief deliberation, the chamber acquitted Hanshue and Givven, but sentenced Brittin and MacCracken to ten days in the District of Columbia jail.

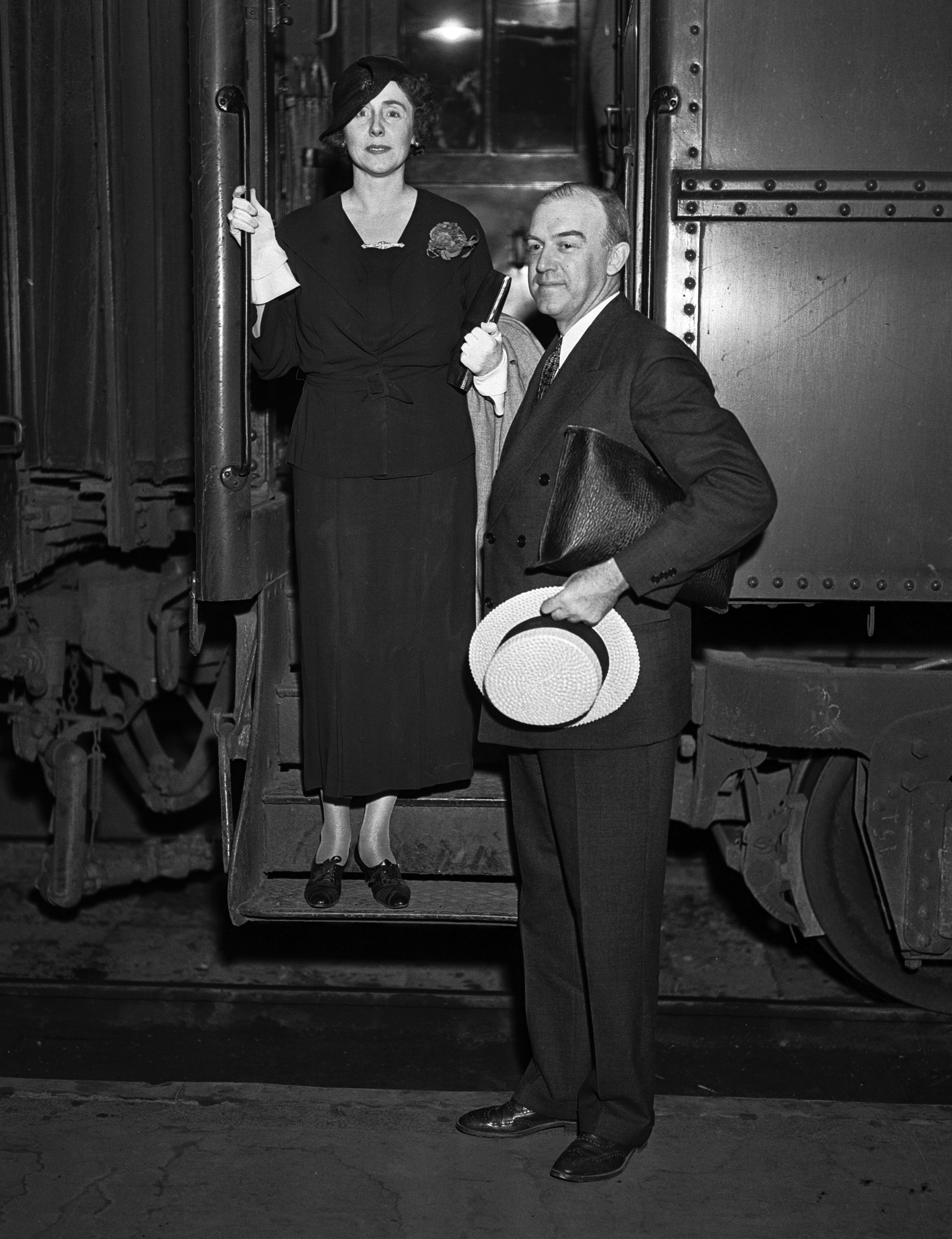
MacCracken and his wife Sally, 1935

While Brittin promptly served his sentence, MacCracken continued to resist the Senate's authority, filing a petition of habeas corpus in federal courts to overturn his arrest. After litigation, the U.S. Supreme Court unanimously ruled that Congress had acted constitutionally, denied the petition in the case Jurney v. MacCracken, and forced him to serve his sentence.According to The Washington Post, "Chesley Jurney, the Senate sargeant at arms, had no place to hold MacCracken who, after being sentenced, showed up at Jurney's house and stayed the night. The next day he was confined to a room at the Willard Hotel".

From 1942 to 1968 MacCracken was an attorney for the American Optometric Association. "His influence on optometry's recognition by the federal government was profound."

A biography of William P. MacCracken was assembled and published by Southern College of Optometry.

He died on September 20, 1969, in Washington, D.C.

== Honors ==
- Secretary, American Bar Association 1925 to 36
- April 6, 1927 recipient of the first pilot certificate issued by the Aeronautics Branch of the Department of Commerce.
- Collier Trophy 1928 (Aeronautics branch of US Department of Commerce)
- LL.D. Norwich University, Northfield Vermont 1936
- Wright Brothers Memorial Trophy 1959
