= Benjamin Foulois =

American military aviator (1879–1967)

Benjamin Delahauf Foulois
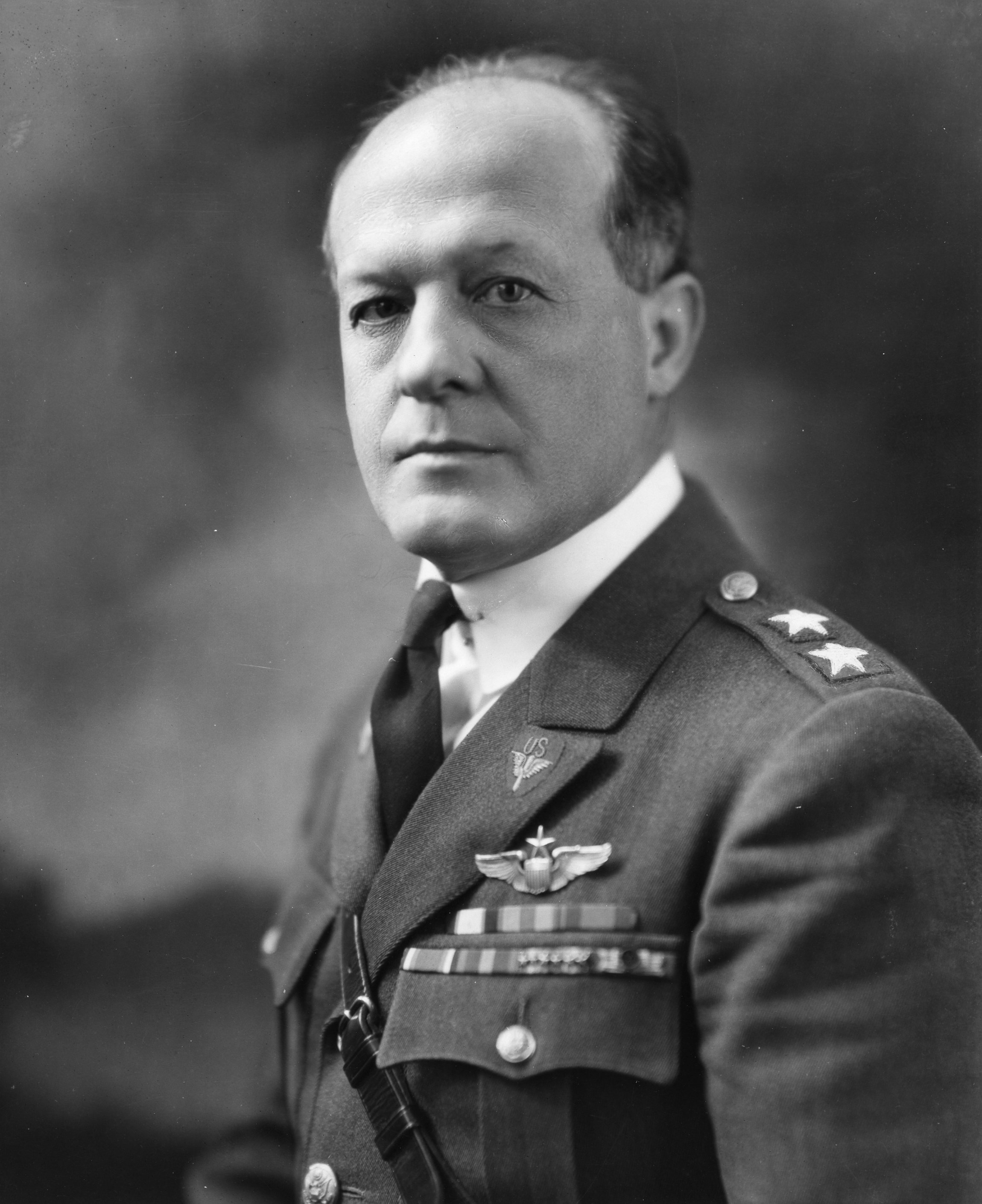
- Benjamin D. Foulois
- Born: December 9, 1879; Washington, Connecticut, U.S.
- Died: April 25, 1967 (aged 87); Andrews Air Force Base, U.S.
- Burial place: Washington, Connecticut
- Military career
- Allegiance: United States of America
- Branch: Infantry, United States Army; Aeronautical Division, Signal Corps; Aviation Section, Signal Corps; United States Army Air Service; United States Army Air Corps
- Service years: 1898–1935
- Rank: Major General
- Commands: Chief of the Air Corps; Chief of the Air Service, AEF; 1st Aero Squadron
- Conflicts: Spanish–American War; Philippine–American War; Pancho Villa Expedition; World War I
- Awards: Distinguished Service Medal; French Légion d'honneur (Commander); Order of the Crown of Italy (Grand Officer); Congressional Air Force Medal of Recognition

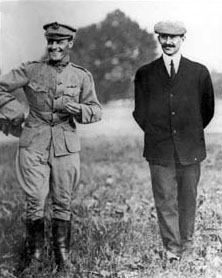
Lt. Foulois and Orville Wright in 1909

Benjamin Delahauf Foulois (December 9, 1879 – April 25, 1967) was a United States Army general who learned to fly the first military planes purchased from the Wright brothers. He became the first military aviator as an airship pilot, and achieved numerous other military aviation "firsts". He led strategic development of the Air Force in the United States.

== Early life ==
Benjamin "Benny" Delahauf Foulois was born on December 9, 1879, in Washington, Connecticut, to a Franco-American pipe-fitter and a Boston-born nurse.

== Early military service ==
At age 18, he used his older brother's birth certificate to enlist in the Army to support the Spanish–American War, but arrived in Puerto Rico just weeks before the armistice was signed. As an engineer, he fought off the rampant tropical diseases, and after five months, was shipped home and mustered out. On June 17, 1899, Foulois enlisted again, using his own name, as a private in the Regular Army and was assigned to the 19th Infantry, where he ultimately achieved the rank of first sergeant, with service in the Philippines on Luzon, Panay, and Cebu. He was commissioned as a second lieutenant on July 9, 1901. Foulois returned to the United States in 1902 and transferred to the 17th Infantry. This regiment served in the Philippines from 1903 to 1905, and Foulois served in Manila, Cottabato, and Mindanao, where he participated in engagements against the Lake Lanao Moros, successfully hunting down and defeating combatant tribal leaders, and as topographical officer for the regiment, participated in surveying and mapping expeditions.

Foulois attended the Infantry and Cavalry School at Fort Leavenworth, Kansas, from September 1905 to August 1906. In 1907, he married Ella Snyder van Horn, the daughter of Colonel James Judson van Horn. Assigned to attend the Army Signal School in the class of 1906–1907, he was recalled to his regiment in September 1906 for duty with an expeditionary force in Cuba during the Second Occupation of Cuba. His experience in surveying in the Philippines led to reassignment to the chief engineer of the force to perform military mapping. He was commissioned as a first lieutenant in the Signal Corps on April 30, 1908, assigned to the office of the Army's chief signal officer (CSO), Brig. Gen. James Allen, and sent to complete Signal School, which he did in July 1908. His final thesis was The Tactical and Strategical Value of Dirigible Balloons and Aerodynamical Flying Machines, within which he demonstrated prescience in such statements as this:

In all future warfare, we can expect to see engagements in the air between hostile aerial fleets. The struggle for supremacy in the air will undoubtedly take place while the opposing armies are maneuvering for position...

He forecast the replacement of the horse by the airplane in reconnaissance, and wireless air-to-ground communications that included the transmission of photographs. As a result, the CSO selected Foulois for the aeronautical board designated to conduct the 1908 airship and airplane acceptance trials. After having selected the Thomas Scott Baldwin airship as the winner of the trial, Foulois was selected as the first military crewman. He took his first flight on August 18 as engineer-pilot, while Baldwin controlled the rudder at the aft end.

== Aviation duty with the Signal Corps 1908–1916 ==
=== Aeronautical Division ===
Foulois' first aviation assignment was duty with the Aeronautical Division, U.S. Signal Corps, where he operated the first dirigible balloon of the U.S. government. The crash of the Wright Military Flyer, procured at the same time by the Army on its final test flight, September 17, 1908, claimed the first US military airplane fatality, First Lt. Thomas E. Selfridge, and also injured Orville Wright. After one year, Foulois had concluded through his experience, understanding of military dirigibles in Europe, and talks with Tom Baldwin, that no military future existed for lighter-than-air aircraft. In expressing this opinion to the Army General Staff, Foulois recommended no more purchases of dirigibles, the first of his many disagreements with the military establishment.

The Wright brothers spent 10 months following the fatal crash in making engineering improvements to the airplane. By July 1909, Orville was ready to complete the acceptance test for the Signal Corps. On July 30, 1909, Foulois' first flight in an aeroplane was the evaluation test flight from Fort Myer to Alexandria, Virginia. Pilot Orville Wright and navigator Foulois broke previous speed, altitude, and cross-country duration records, flying at 42.5 mph, 400 feet, and for 10 miles (16 km). The Army purchased this Wright Model A Military Flyer, which became "Signal Corps No. 1". The final condition of the contract was to train two pilots.

Foulois and Lieutenant Frank P. Lahm were initially designated to take direct instruction from the Wright brothers, but the CSO instead sent Foulois to Nancy, France, in September 1909 as a delegate to the International Congress of Aeronautics, possibly as a result of resentment of his outspoken criticism of the dirigible. He returned on October 23 to College Park, Maryland, where Wilbur Wright had begun training Lahm and Lieutenant Frederick E. Humphreys. Humphreys made the first military solo in an airplane on October 26, 1909, followed by Lahm. Although not contractually obligated to do so, Wilbur took Foulois up and allowed him to handle the controls, then turned him over to Humphreys for instruction. Foulois totaled 3 hours and 2 minutes at the controls, virtually equaling the flight time of Humphreys and Lahm, but did not make any landings, nor did he solo. On November 5, Humphreys and Lahm cartwheeled S.C. No. 1 during landing, damaging the rudder and necessitating replacement of a wing, at a time when neither Wright brother was available. In addition, both officers were recalled to their branches of service.

=== Duty in Texas ===
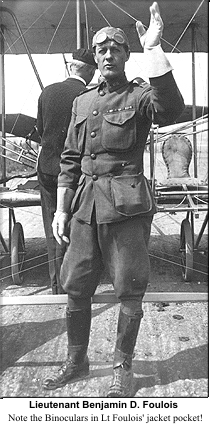
Lieutenant Benjamin Foulois, Texas, 1911

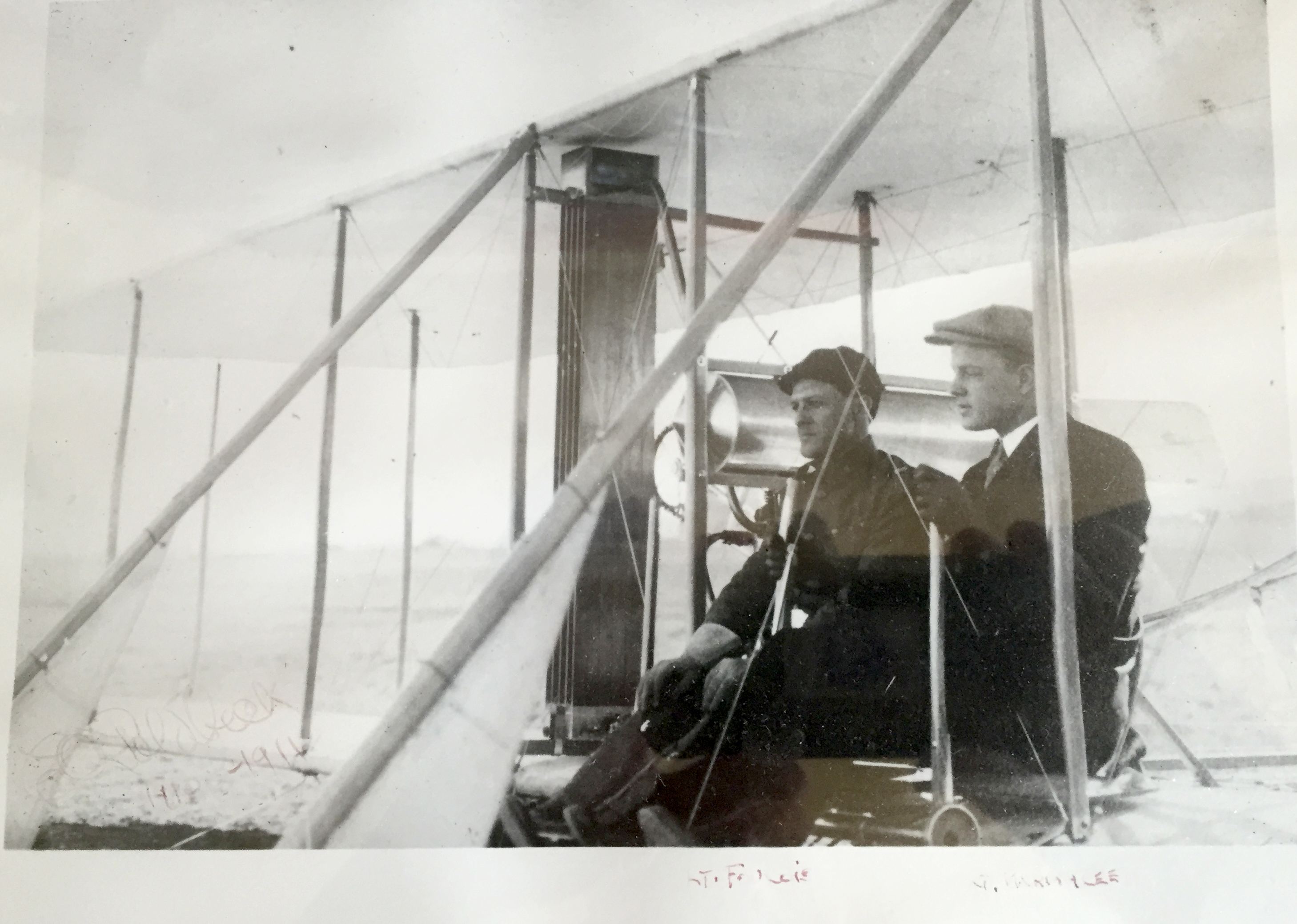
Lt. Benjamin Foulois and his instructor pilot Phillip Parmelee, 1910

While waiting to repair the airplane, the Signal Corps decided to seek a more favorable climate location for flying during the winter. Foulois was directed to report to Fort Sam Houston in San Antonio, Texas, where he was directed by CSO Allen to "teach yourself to fly." He did so, and at 9:30 a.m. on March 2, 1910, on the Arthur MacArthur parade field made four flights on S.C. No. 1, which included his first solo takeoff, first solo landing, and first crash. Over the next 15 months, Foulois modified S.C. No. 1's elevators at the instructions in correspondence from Orville Wright, and demonstrated the use of the Wright B aircraft for aerial mapping, photography, and reconnaissance, and the use of the radio while airborne. To end the requirement of using a 60-foot launch rail to take off, he drew up plans for and installed wheels in place of skids, and equipped the S.C. No. 1 with the first seat belt, using a four-foot leather cinch obtained from the cavalry saddlery. According to Foulois: "The second flight I made after crashing the first time I took it up I got almost thrown out; landed; the artillery officer came up there and I told him, Fred, I wanted to get a belt to keep me in that damn plane. He said, whaddya want? and I said a strap about four feet long, something I can lash myself to the seat with. That was the first safety belt invented." As the result of repeated crashes and repairs, many caused by Foulois being "ground shy" (the result of his having no formal training in landing an airplane), S.C. No. 1 became unflyable, and in February 1911 the Army leased a Wright Model B from Robert Collier. Because Foulois was unfamiliar with the type, the Wright Company sent Philip O. Parmalee to instruct.

In early 1911, the United States gathered much of the Regular Army in South Texas as a show of force to Mexican revolutionaries, forming the "Maneuver Division". On March 3, 1911, Foulois and Parmalee made the first official military reconnaissance flight (without crossing the border), looking for Army troops between Laredo and Eagle Pass, Texas, with a ground exercise in progress. Two days later, returning from a cross-country flight, they accidentally shut off the engine, and in trying to restart it, crashed into the Rio Grande. Neither was injured and the airplane was eventually repaired and returned to Collier.

Foulois was joined in April by three students from the Curtiss Aviation School in San Diego, including Capt. Paul W. Beck and Second Lt. George E. M. Kelly, to form a provisional "aero company" created April 5, 1911, by the Maneuver Division in anticipation of training 18 more pilots. Beck, like Foulois, was dual-commissioned in the Signal Corps and being senior, (Note: Beck was senior to Foulois in rank and all other service aspects (commissioned time, infantry seniority, Signal Corps seniority) except aviation experience.) took command of the company, an action that Foulois resented. Friction and mutual rivalry with the new pilots also existed because they had no experience on the Wright machine, instead being trained on the Curtiss Military biplane. On May 3, 1911, Beck crashed the Curtiss machine after its engine failed at 300 feet. A week later, flying the same airplane after its repair, Kelly was killed trying to land minutes into his qualification flight.

Foulois blamed Beck for improper repairs to the craft, and also questioned his ability to command, but the investigating board, of which both Foulois and Beck were members, ruled that Kelly's death resulted from landing at too high a speed. In any event, the army shut down all aviation training at Fort Sam Houston and sent pilots and airplanes to College Park, Maryland, where its first aviation school was about to commence. Beck was ordered there as the instructor on the Curtiss machine in June, but Foulois remained on duty with the Maneuver Division until July 11, when he was reassigned to the Militia Bureau in Washington, DC.

=== Return to aviation ===
Foulois was assigned as Officer In Charge, Signal Corps and Corps of Engineers Units in the Organized Militia. On April 29, 1912, his Signal Corps commission was discharged and he was nominally returned to the Infantry, but remained with the Militia Bureau, where he was able to continue flying periodically at the aviation school in College Park. In July 1911, the Army adopted as its standard to be a military pilot the licensing requirements of the Fédération Aéronautique Internationale (FAI), which ruled on June 26, 1912, that he met, issuing FAI Certificate No. 140. In the meantime, the Army published its own pilot qualification standards on April 20, 1912, and Foulois became the third army pilot to be rated a military aviator, on July 13. In October 1912, Foulois was returned to infantry troop duty under requirements of the "Manchu Law", otherwise known as the congressionally-mandated "Detached Service Law," and assigned to Fort Leavenworth with the 7th Infantry. Foulois was returned to aviation duty in November 1913, and detailed the next month to the Signal Corps Aviation School at North Island, San Diego, California, where the 1st Aero Squadron was officially constituted as a unit of the Signal Corps. In January 1914, the organization of the squadron was approved by the CSO and Foulois became commanding officer of its 1st Company, comprising three Burgess aircraft and 26 enlisted men. Later in 1914, Foulois became squadron commander. The Aeronautical Department experienced a spate of fatal accidents in 1912 and 1913, most involving the Wright Model C airplane, and convened a board of aviators to investigate safety concerns and make recommendations. Foulois, along with Captain Townsend F. Dodd and Lieutenants Walter R. Taliaferro, Carleton G. Chapman, and Joseph E. Carberry, condemned not just the Wright C, but all "pusher" aircraft as unsafe on February 16, 1914, and those remaining in the Army inventory were ordered to be immediately grounded. The following month, the board drew up specifications for a tractor-configured training airplane.

On November 19, 1915, Foulois led the 1st Aero Squadron cross-country flight of six Curtiss JN3s from Post Field, Fort Sill, Oklahoma, to Ft Sam Houston, San Antonio, Texas, intended as the site for the first permanent base of the Aviation Section, the San Antonio Air Center. In 1916, Pancho Villa crossed into New Mexico and killed 17 Americans. In response, Brig. Gen. John J. Pershing was directed to pursue Villa into Mexico, and Foulois was ordered to take eight airplanes to provide reconnaissance and communication. On 15 March 1916, Foulois and the 1st Aero Squadron arrived at Columbus, New Mexico, for duty. On 16 March, Foulois flew as the observer with Dodd on the first American military reconnaissance flight over foreign territory (overflying Mexico in search of Villa). Within eight weeks, six of the aircraft had been destroyed, as the airplane could not contend with the high altitude, severe weather, and dry atmosphere.

== World War I ==
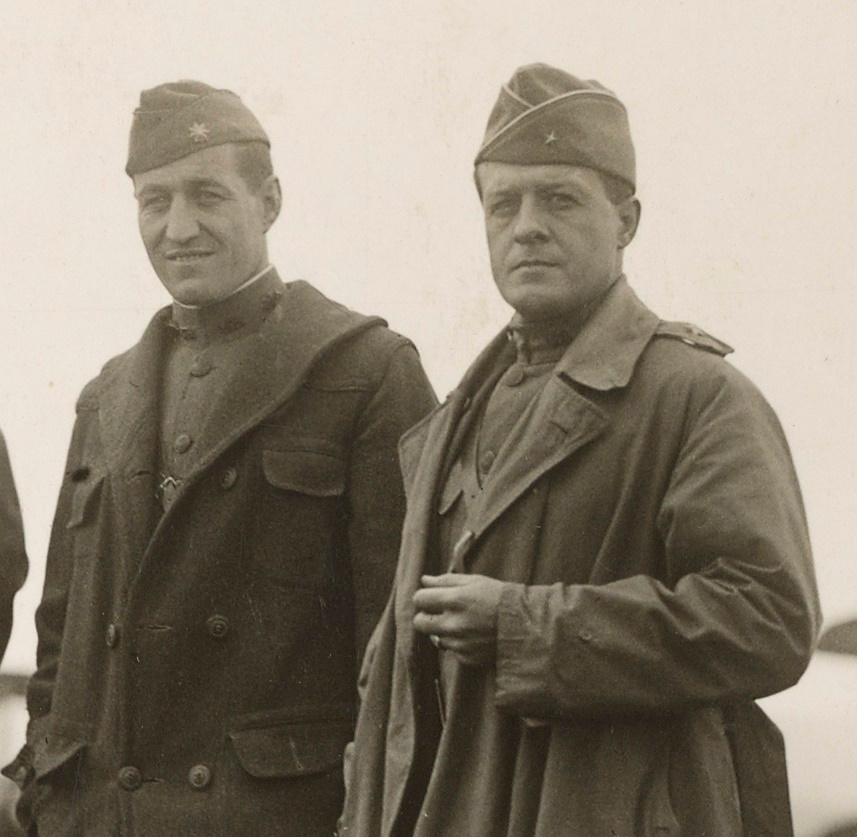
Then Major Ralph Royce (left) with Brigadier General Benjamin Foulois in France, 1918.

Brigadier General William "Billy" Mitchell and Foulois clashed bitterly over the years. Both were ambitious, strong-willed, independent thinkers, but Mitchell came from a wealthy family and was the son of a United States Senator. Foulois came from a middle-class family, and impressed his peers with his willingness to roll up his sleeves and work with the mechanics. Moreover, Mitchell had been senior to Foulois until their mutual service in France, and would be again following the war. Both played an important role in the development of the independent Air Force, but Mitchell worked by swaying public opinion, while Foulois preferred to make direct testimony to Congress, with often controversial verbal attacks against the military establishment.

From March to September 1917, General Foulois was charged with the responsibility for the production, maintenance, organization, and operations of all American aeronautical material and personnel in the United States. In March, he worked with Major General George Squier, who was the CSO, and the National Advisory Committee for Aeronautics to detail plans for appropriations of $54 million to support 16 aero squadrons, 16 balloon companies, and nine aviation schools. The French government requested the U.S. provide 4,500 trained pilots by the spring of 1918, which would require 4,900 training aircraft and 12,000 combat planes. The appropriation signed on July 24, 1917, was for $640 million, the largest for a single purpose in the history of Congress. On the same date, Foulois was promoted from major to the temporary rank of brigadier general, to enable him to oversee this responsibility.

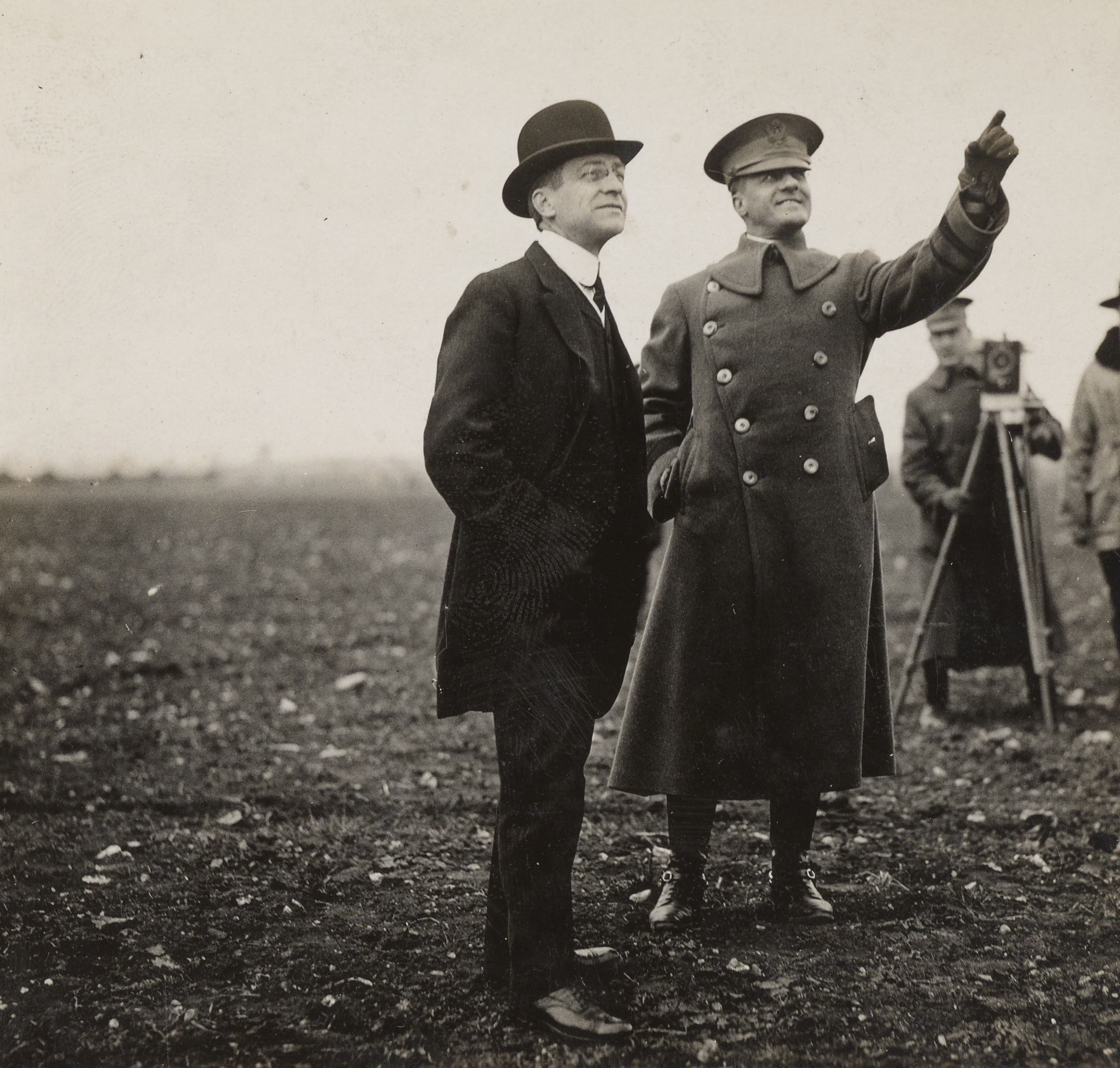
Benjamin Foulois with Secretary of War Newton D. Baker at the Issoudun Aerodrome in February 1918

In October 1917, he was transferred to France, and had the same responsibilities in France, the British Isles, and Italy. In November 1917, he became Chief of Air Service, American Expeditionary Force, and assumed additional duties as a member of the Joint Army and Navy Aircraft Committee in France; representative of the commander in chief, American Expeditionary Forces on the Inter-Allied Expert Committee on Aviation of the Supreme War Council, and commandant of the Army Aeronautical Schools. Resentment of Foulois's staff, with 112 officers and 300 enlisted men, most inexperienced and recently commissioned nonflying officers, led to strong criticism from Brigadier General Billy Mitchell, who commanded the Air Service Zone of Advance. In his memoirs, Mitchell wrote:

"Just when things had begun to work smoothly, a shipment of aviation officers arrived under Brigadier General Benjamin Foulois, over one hundred in number, almost none of whom had ever seen an airplane. … As rapidly as possible, the competent men, who had learned their duties in the face of the enemy, were displaced and their positions taken by these carpetbaggers."

Foulois responded:

"... this extract is proof of Mitchell's disregard for facts" and "While Mitchell had every right to have an opinion about me and my staff, his attitude toward us made our jobs doubly difficult. The seeds of insubordination had already been sown when I relieved him, and his memoirs prove how distorted an opinion he had of himself as an expert on air matters."

Creation and deployment of tactical squadrons lagged badly behind the schedule Foulois had promised Pershing, and the supply situation for the Air Service was not improving. Friction between Foulois' nonflying staff and the aviators in command of the instruction schools and the combat squadrons grew to the point of extreme inefficiency. In April 1918, Foulois tried to enforce a cooperative spirit from his own staff without success. In May, he requested relief from his position as Chief of Air Service and recommended to General Pershing that Mitchell should be replaced. Pershing appointed Major General Mason M. Patrick to replace Foulois, who then became Patrick's assistant. (Note: Pershing appointed Patrick to bring order to the Air Service AEF, which was described as "a tangled mess" under Foulois.) Foulois was appointed Chief of Air Service, First Army, with Mitchell still his subordinate, made chief of Air Service I Corps. The ensuing change of command and the unceasing bitterness between the two men continued. Foulois asserted in his memoirs that while he felt Mitchell was openly insubordinate, disloyal to his superiors, and constantly deviating from the military chain of command in giving orders, Mitchell also possessed the ability and experience to supervise air battles and create a high fighting spirit, exemplified by the battle of Chateau-Thierry.

Three months later, when a major loss of coordination between offensive units and replacement units occurred at Toul, Foulois again requested relief from his position, this time to again be in charge of Air Service logistics, to straighten out the snarled lines of communication before the major offensives in the fall. He also recommended that Mitchell replace him as Chief of Air Service, First Army. Foulois briefly became Assistant Chief of Air Service, Zone of Advance, but that position was eliminated when the Service of Supply created a forward headquarters near the front in addition to its main headquarters in Tours, and Foulois became the Assistant Chief of Air Service, Service of Supply.

== Rise to Chief of the Air Corps ==
After the Armistice, November 11, 1918, Foulois served with Patrick on the Supreme War Council, assisting Patrick and Colonel Edgar S. Gorrell draft the air clauses of the Treaty of Versailles. Upon his return to the U.S. in July 1919, Foulois was assigned to the Office of the Director of Air Service at Washington, D.C., in charge of the Air Service Liquidation Division, responsible for the settlement of war claims against the United States. Just as quickly as he had been promoted to general officer rank, he was reduced along with thousands of other officers to his permanent establishment rank of captain, Infantry. He received promotion to major on July 1, 1920, when the Army Reorganization Act took effect, and transferred in grade to the Air Service, which the act had made a combat arm, on August 11.

In August 1919, Foulois appeared before the Frear subcommittee hearings on aviation during the war, and before the Senate Military Affairs Subcommittee considering the Crowell Commission report (which advocated an independent air force) in October. He testified with stinging accusations toward the Army General Staff and Franklin D. Roosevelt, the assistant Secretary of the Navy. (Note: Foulois accompanied Director of Air Service Maj. Gen. Charles Menoher to the Frear hearings. Menoher testified that in his opinion the enthusiasm of aviators for an independent air arm stemmed from a desire for personal promotion. Foulois was asked to comment and acidly defied the General Staff to produce one officer who had ever done anything constructive for aviation.)

Having stirred up Washington, Foulois heard that a military attaché was needed in Europe with aviation expertise. He was sent in April 1920 to The Hague as assistant air attache, with observer duties in Berlin. At the same time his wife asked him for a divorce, which was decreed in 1921. (Ella Foulois later became the wife of General Harry Gore Bishop). Since the United States had not yet ratified the Treaty of Versailles, the allies would not share any intelligence with Foulois, and technically the U.S. was still at war with Germany. Foulois found that the Adlon Hotel bar in Berlin was frequented by many aviation cognoscenti. By sharing food and Allied whisky, Foulois was able to obtain a large amount of aviation intelligence from German pilots who included Ernst Udet and Hermann Göring. After gaining the confidence of these sources, Foulois was invited to join the two top aviation organizations in Germany: the German Aeronautical Scientific Society and the Aero Club of Germany. During his time in Berlin, he met Elisabeth Shepperd Grant, a Philadelphian working as a translator in the American Embassy, and married her two weeks before his return to the United States in 1924.

Foulois gathered the equivalent of a railroad boxcar full of valuable documents, drawings, technical bulletins, magazines, books, blueprints and reports. By having talked with more than 180 individuals, he had a valuable collection of German aviation knowledge. However, he wrote: "I only hoped that it was being put to good use in America. To my eternal regret, it wasn't. The lack of an air intelligence collection system, inexperience on the part of the military intelligence officers in regard to aeronautics, and a lack of appreciation for the potential value of the fruits of German genius caused much of the material I sent to end up unopened in a warehouse and later sent to the trash heap."

After many years, Foulois achieved his desire to command a flying unit, and was assigned command of Mitchel Field, Long Island, New York, in 1925. The same year, Billy Mitchell was convicted in a court-martial, which resulted in his resignation in February 1926.

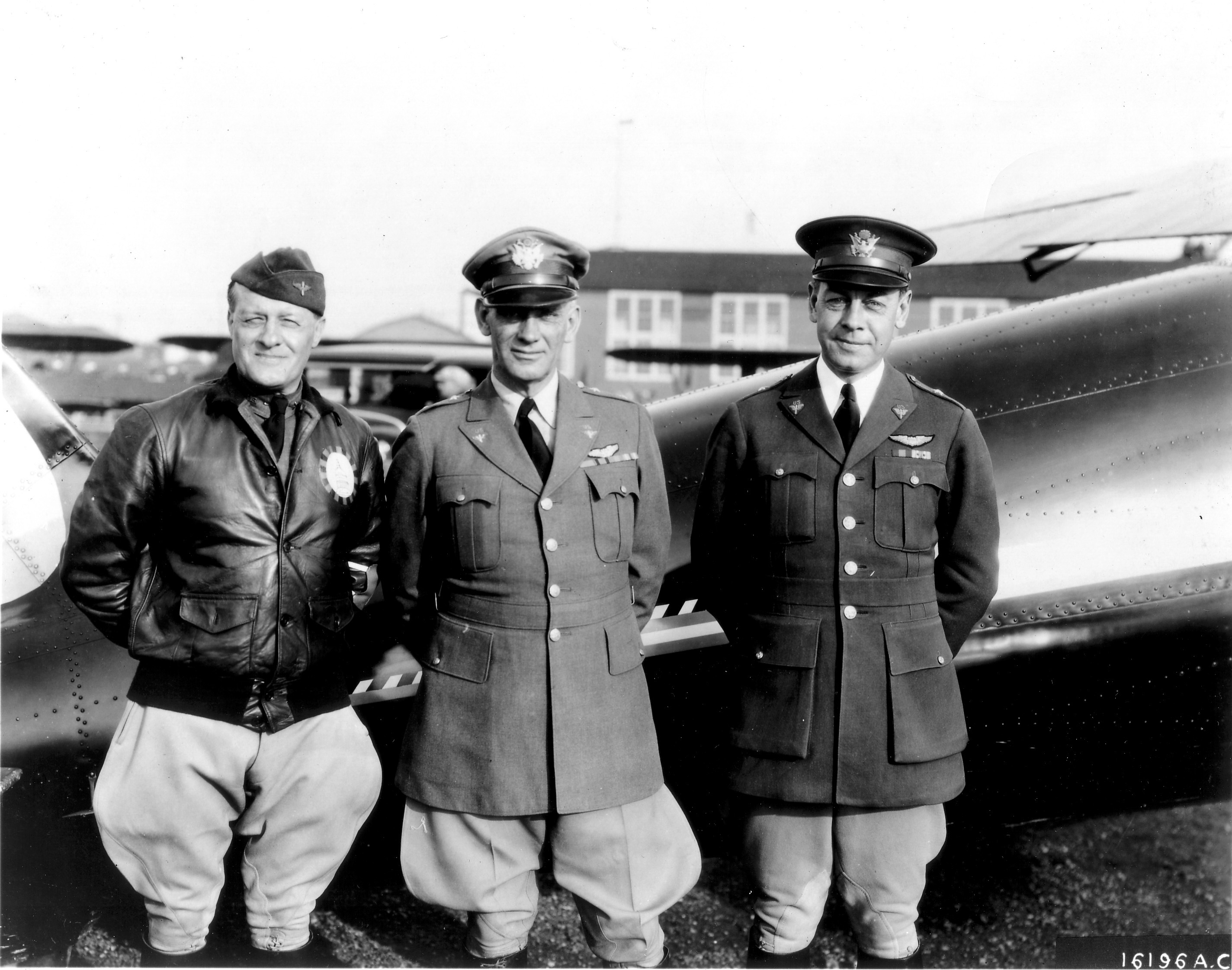
Brig. Gen. Benjamin D. Foulois (left), Maj. Gen. James E. Fechet and Brig. Gen. H. Conger Pratt

In December 1927, when James E. Fechet was promoted to Air Corps Chief, Foulois began a four-year tour as one of the three Assistant Chiefs of the Air Corps, which carried with it a temporary rank of brigadier general, including a year as Chief of the Materiel Division at Wright Field, Dayton, Ohio, from June 1929 to July 1930. In May 1931 he commanded the Air Corps exercises, leading an armada of 672 airplanes, coast-to-coast defense flights, combat competition and large scale attacks. The leadership of this exercise earned Foulois the Mackey Trophy for the most meritorious military flight of 1931.

On December 19, 1931, following Fechet's retirement, he was appointed Chief of the Air Corps by President Herbert Hoover, which carried the rank of major general. Foulois had already appeared before Congress on 75 occasions to testify on military matters. During the next four years, he was in constant communication with Congress on the future of the Air Corps, during a time when economic hardships were forcing severe budget cuts. While this initially resulted in a solid base of support from supporters of aviation, it eventually proved a two-edged sword: when he lost their support in 1934–1935, his position as Chief of Air Corps became untenable.

Coast defence had traditionally been a primary function of the Army, with the line of demarcation the range of its coast artillery guns. The range of aircraft ostensibly confused the issue and opened a competition between the Air Service and Naval Aviation for the mission, and thus for further development of its service. A compromise reached between the Chief of Naval Operations and General Douglas MacArthur in January 1931 gave the land-based Air Service the mission, while the Navy was to defend the fleet. Following that, the apparent invincibility of long range Martin B-10 bombers against the slower Boeing P-12 pursuit planes led Foulois and the Air Corps leadership to begin the development of long-range bombers in 1933. Without this foresight, the development of the B-17's and B-24's, essential to eventual separation of the Air Force from the Army, would not have taken place.

Foulois served as Chief of the Air Corps during the Air Mail scandal of 1934. Under pressure from President Roosevelt, Foulois committed the service to delivering the mail without consulting Chief of Staff Douglas MacArthur, while knowing that the Air Corps was ill-equipped and untrained to fly in winter conditions. At the time, commercial air carriers derived stable income from carrying the U.S. mail. Allegations of a conspiracy to defraud the government in these contracts resulted in assignment of all air-mail delivery to the Air Corps, beginning on February 19, 1934, and lasting through May 17, 1934. The 1,500,000 miles (2,400,000 km) flown by the Air Corps pilots, with insufficient training, equipment, funding, and experience, resulted in numerous fatal crashes. Foulois became the middleman in a political battle between the commercial aviation owners, Congress, and the military. Foulois later wrote that the "fiasco" was just as historically significant as the first flight or the first air combat mission. He argued that its lasting effect helped identify the needs of the peacetime Air Corps and the Baker Board's recommendation for a GHQ Air Force, which was implemented in March 1935.

== Retirement ==
The 1934 Rogers Subcommittee investigation into improper contracting and procurement awards charged Foulois with violations of law in awarding contracts, mismanagement of the Army Air Corps Mail Operation, and making misleading statements to Congress. Chairman William N. Rogers called for the resignation of Foulois and threatened to hold up Air Corps appropriations. Although he carried his fight to the public through the media with the backing of Secretary of War George Dern, Foulois decided to retire "for the good of the service," asserting that he did so that the focus could return to the vital task of building the Air Force in the face of a resurgence in German airpower. His retirement date coincided with the end of his four-year term as Chief of Air Corps, and existing law allowed him to retire at his temporary rank of major general. Foulois officially left active duty December 31, 1935, after 36 years of service. In spite of his remarkable career, he departed with no farewell from the General Staff, no parade, and no aircraft fly-by.

He accurately warned of the buildup of German air power, and the need to build a strong air force and to take defensive measures to protect the East Coast. Prior to World War II, he ran New Jersey's civil defense program. In 1941, Foulois ran as a Republican for New Jersey's 2nd congressional district, losing to four-term Democratic incumbent Elmer H. Wene. When World War II broke out he would have returned to active duty if offered a combat position. When the War Department offered him only a staff job, he demurred and opted to devote his energies to New Jersey Civil Defense. He continued to write and speak for 17 years from his home in Ventnor City, New Jersey.

His wife Elisabeth grew very ill and Foulois had difficulty paying for her care. Generals Carl Spaatz and Ira Eaker interceded with Air Force Chief of Staff, General Thomas D. White, to allow Foulois to live at Andrews Air Force Base. In return he would tour the world as a senior spokesman to promote Air Force issues. Thus, in his eighties he traveled 500,000 miles (800,000 km) by air, emphasizing national security to the men and women of the U.S. Air Force at home and overseas.

In 1963, Foulois appeared on the television quiz show I've Got a Secret, where his secret was that he had once been the entire U.S. Air Force. General Foulois died on April 25, 1967, following a stroke at age 87, and was buried in his hometown of Washington, Connecticut.

Foulois had worked for 18 months with Carroll V. Glines on a biography of his life, though he died before the publicity tour could take place. The book, titled From the Wright Brothers to the Astronauts, was published in 1968. The biography was republished in 1980 for sale to libraries; only 400 copies were produced. A new edition of the biography, re-titled Foulois: One-Man Air Force, emerged in 2010.

== Electoral history ==
United States House of Representatives elections, 1942
| Party | Candidate | Votes | % | ±% |
|---|---|---|---|---|
| Democratic | Elmer H. Wene (incumbent) | 40,478 | 52.98 | ▲0.83 |
| Republican | Benjamin D. Foulois | 35,930 | 47.02 | |
| Total votes | | 76,408 | 100.0 | |
| Democratic hold | | | | |

== Pronunciation of Foulois ==
Asked how to say his name, he told The Literary Digest "Rhymes with to cloy: foo-loy'." (Charles Earle Funk, What's the Name, Please?, Funk & Wagnalls, 1936.) The French pronunciation of Foulois family name is "fool-wah".

== Legacy ==
- General Foulois was enshrined in 1963 in the National Aviation Hall of Fame
- General Foulois is a member of the Military Intelligence Hall of Fame.
- The Foulois House is a lodging facility on Fort Sam Houston, Texas, named in his honor.
- The Benjamin D. Foulois Creative and Performing Arts Academy in Morningside, Maryland, is named in his honor.
- General Foulois received the Golden Plate Award of the American Academy of Achievement in 1965.

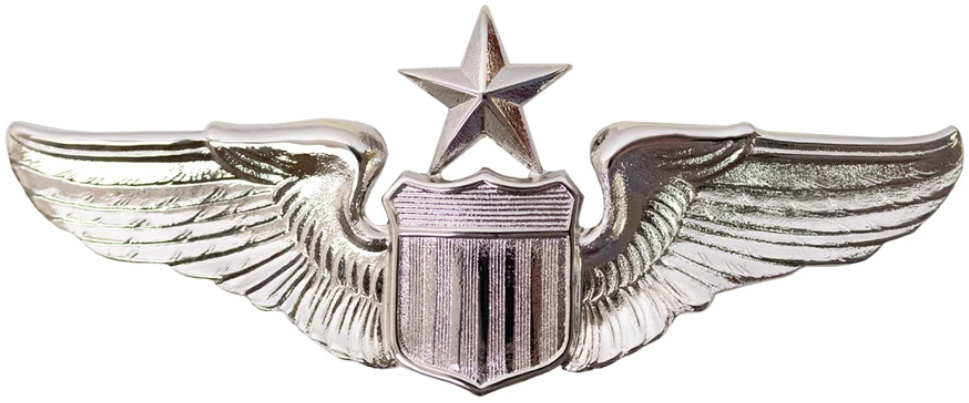

Senior Pilot Badge
| Army Distinguished Service Medal | Mexican Border Service Medal | World War I Victory Medal |

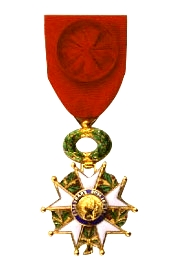
Legion of Honour medal

== See also ==
- Early Birds of Aviation

== Footnotes ==
Footnotes

Citations
