= Joseph E. Carberry =

American aviator (1887–1961)

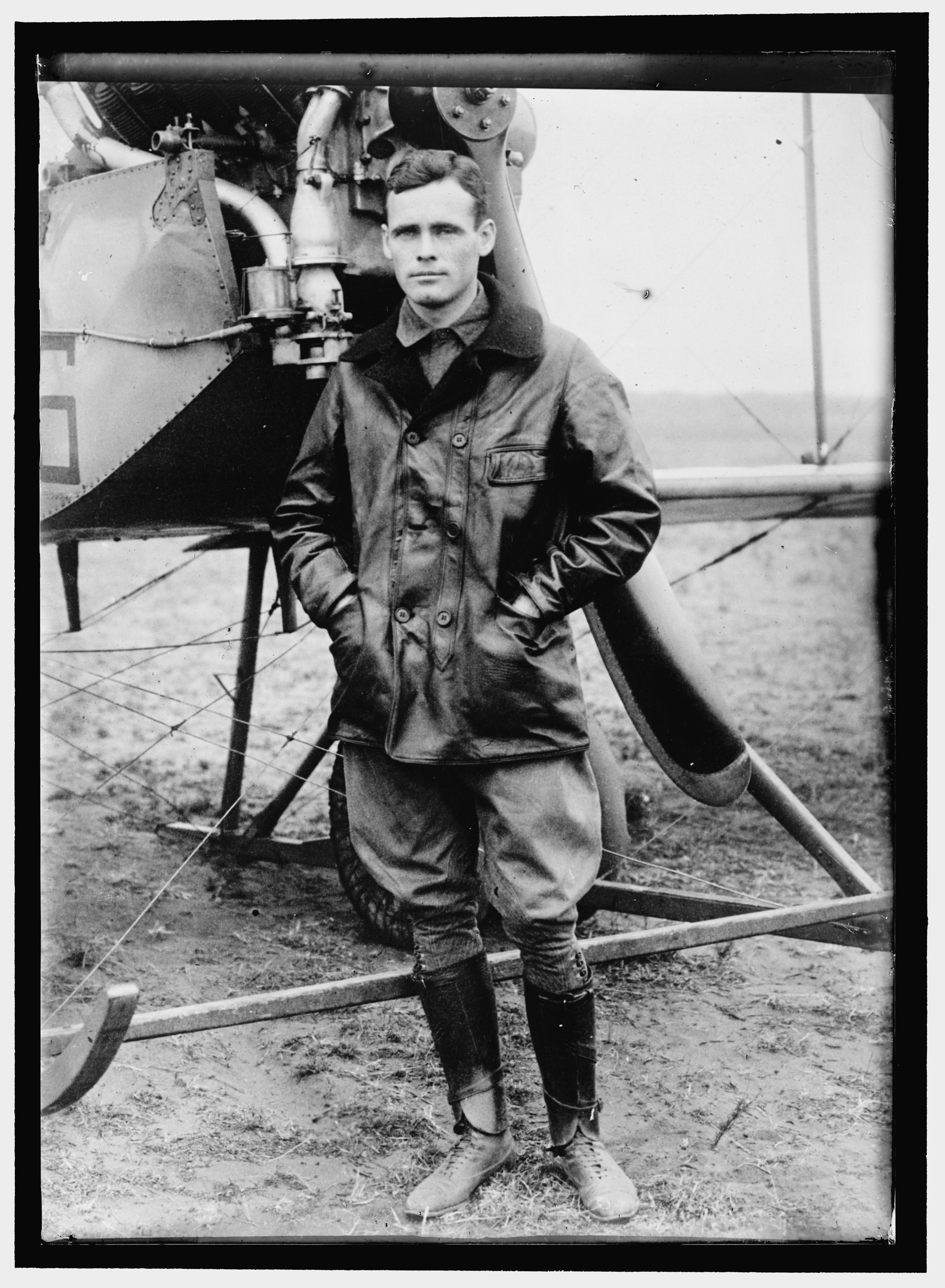

Joseph Eugene Carberry (July 20, 1887 – November 12, 1961) was a pioneer aviator. He won the Mackay Trophy in 1913 with Fred Seydel.

== Biography ==
He was born on July 20, 1887, to John M. Carberry in Waukesha, Wisconsin. He graduated from West Point in 1910, and became one of the first US military aviators in September 1913.

Carberry set an Army record for altitude carrying a passenger on December 26, 1913, piloting a Curtiss Model G to 7,800 feet (2,400 m). Three days later he won the MacKay Trophy at Encinitas, California, this time flying S.C. No. 23, a Curtiss Model E airplane manufactured by Army aviators entirely from spare parts. On January 5, 1915, he set an altitude record of 11,690 feet (3,560 m), carrying Capt. Benjamin Delahauf Foulois as a passenger.

Carberry later served in the Mexican Punitive Expedition and on the Western Front, rising to the rank of major. He was retired for disability in 1924, and promoted to lieutenant colonel on the retired list in 1930.

He died at his home in Arcadia, California, on November 12, 1961. He was buried at Fort Rosecrans National Cemetery.
