= Air Mail scandal =

1934 US political scandal

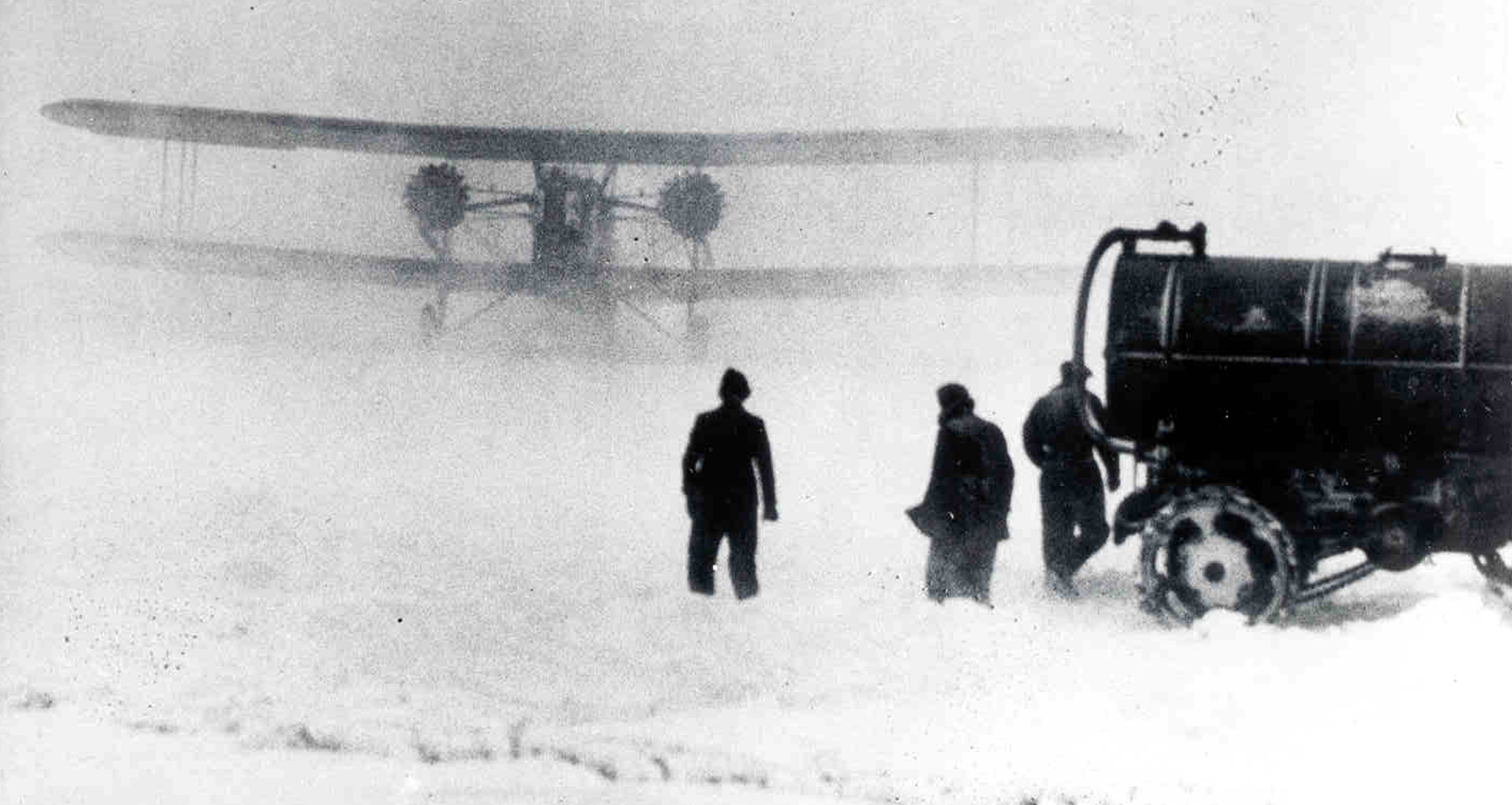
- Keystone B-6 twin-engine air mail plane of the US Army Air Corps in snow storm
- Date: September 28, 1933 – June 12, 1934
- Also known as: Air Mail fiasco
- Participants: United States Senate; Postmaster Walter Folger Brown; William MacCracken Jr.; U.S. domestic airline industry; President Franklin D. Roosevelt; Charles Lindbergh; United States Army Air Corps; Major General Benjamin Foulois
- Outcome: 13 airmen killed in accidents; Air Mail Act of 1934 enacted; Air Corps modernized; United Aircraft and Transport Corporation broken up

The Air Mail scandal, also known as the Air Mail fiasco, was a political controversy that erupted in 1934 following a congressional investigation into the awarding of airmail contracts to select airlines. The scandal intensified when the U.S. government revoked these contracts and assigned mail delivery to the U.S. Army Air Corps (USAAC), leading to disastrous consequences.

Under President Herbert Hoover, the Air Mail Act of 1930 allowed Walter Folger Brown, then the postmaster general, to award contracts at the "Spoils Conference", where major airlines divided routes among themselves, excluding smaller carriers. When details of the conference emerged, it became a scandal. A Senate investigation led to a contempt of Congress citation against William P. MacCracken Jr., the assistant secretary of commerce for aeronautics, but no further action was taken against Hoover administration officials.

In response, newly elected President Franklin D. Roosevelt canceled all airmail contracts on February 19, 1934, and assigned the USAAC to carry the mail. However, the military was ill-equipped for the job, and severe winter conditions led to numerous crashes and the death of 13 airmen within days, sparking a public outcry, and would be called a fiasco in the press. Roosevelt ordered the service be returned to the airlines and Postmaster General James Farley issued temporary contracts on May 8, using a process similar to the original Spoils Conference. The airlines resumed operating the flights by June 1, and soon after, Congress passed the Air Mail Act of 1934, repealing the 1930 law, penalizing executives involved in the earlier deal, and leading to the breakup of the United Aircraft and Transport Corporation. The scandal also led to significant reforms in the airline industry, that spurred technological advancements, a shift toward passenger transport, and the modernization of the U.S. Army Air Corps.

== Roots of the scandal ==
=== Development of air mail ===
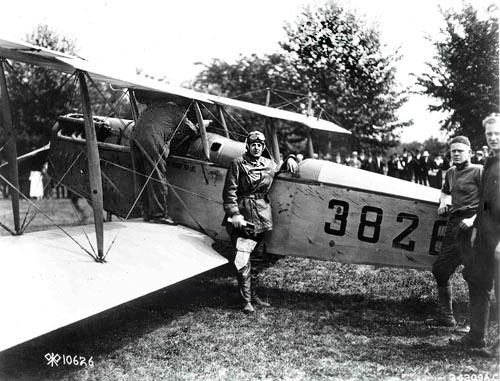
Major Ruben H. Fleet beside s/n 38262 after delivering it to Washington, D.C., for the first airmail flight

The first scheduled airmail service in the United States was conducted during World War I by the Air Service of the United States Army between May 15 and August 10, 1918, a daily run between Washington, D.C., and New York City with an intermediate stop in Philadelphia, Pennsylvania. The operation was put together in ten days by Major Reuben H. Fleet, the executive officer for flying training of the Division of Military Aeronautics, and managed by Captain Benjamin B. Lipsner, a non-flyer. Starting with six converted Curtiss JN-4HM "Jennies", two of which were destroyed in crashes, and later using Curtiss R-4LMs, in 76 days of operations Air Service pilots moved 20 tons of mail without a single fatality or serious injury, achieving a 74% completion rate of flights during the summer thunderstorm season. (Note: The first completed flight of the route was made by 2d Lt. James C. Edgerton on May 15, 1918, flying the Philadelphia to D.C. leg in s/n 38274. He brought 136 pounds of mail from New York, flown from Hazelhurst Field on Long Island to Philadelphia by Lt. Torrey H. Webb in s/n 38278, who also delivered eight pounds of mail to the Philadelphia postmaster. An identical relay flight in the opposite direction, carrying a ceremonial letter from the president to the postmaster of New York, was begun from D.C. by Lt. George L. Boyle in s/n 38262 after an embarrassing delay in front of the gathered audience when he was unable to start the engine. Boyle and Edgerton had been added to the operation by the Post Office Department for their political connections. Edgerton's father was purchasing agent for the Department and Boyle's prospective father-in-law, Judge Charles C. McChord, was an appointed official in the Wilson Administration who had kept delivery of parcel post as the responsibility of the post office. Both had just graduated from flying training at Ellington Field in Texas and had only 60 hours student pilot experience. They were chosen to replace two experienced instructor pilots hand-picked by Fleet to make the first day's flights. Boyle got lost in the fog shortly after takeoff and force-landed in a farm field 25 miles outside Washington, headed in the wrong direction. Edgerton delivered Boyle's load the next day on his return trip and eventually made 52 mail flights in the initial operation. He moved over to the post office operation later in 1918 as superintendent of flight operations under Lipsner. The less fortunate Boyle got a second chance on May 17, but even though he was led part of the way by another Jenny (depending on the account, flown by either Fleet or Edgerton), got lost again and wrecked his plane trying to land on a golf course. He was not given a third chance but did marry Margaret McChord on June 15, 1918 and went on to become a lawyer. (Eney and Glines))

Air mail operations by the U.S. Post Office began in August 1918 under Lipsner, who resigned from the Army on July 13 to take the post. Lipsner procured Standard JR-1B biplanes specially modified to carry the mail with twice the range of the military mailplanes, the first civil aircraft built to U.S. government specifications. For nine years, using mostly war-surplus de Havilland DH.4 biplanes, the Post Office built and flew a nationwide network. In the beginning the work was extremely dangerous; of the initial 40 pilots, three died in crashes in 1919 and nine more in 1920. It was 1922 before an entire year ensued without a fatal crash.

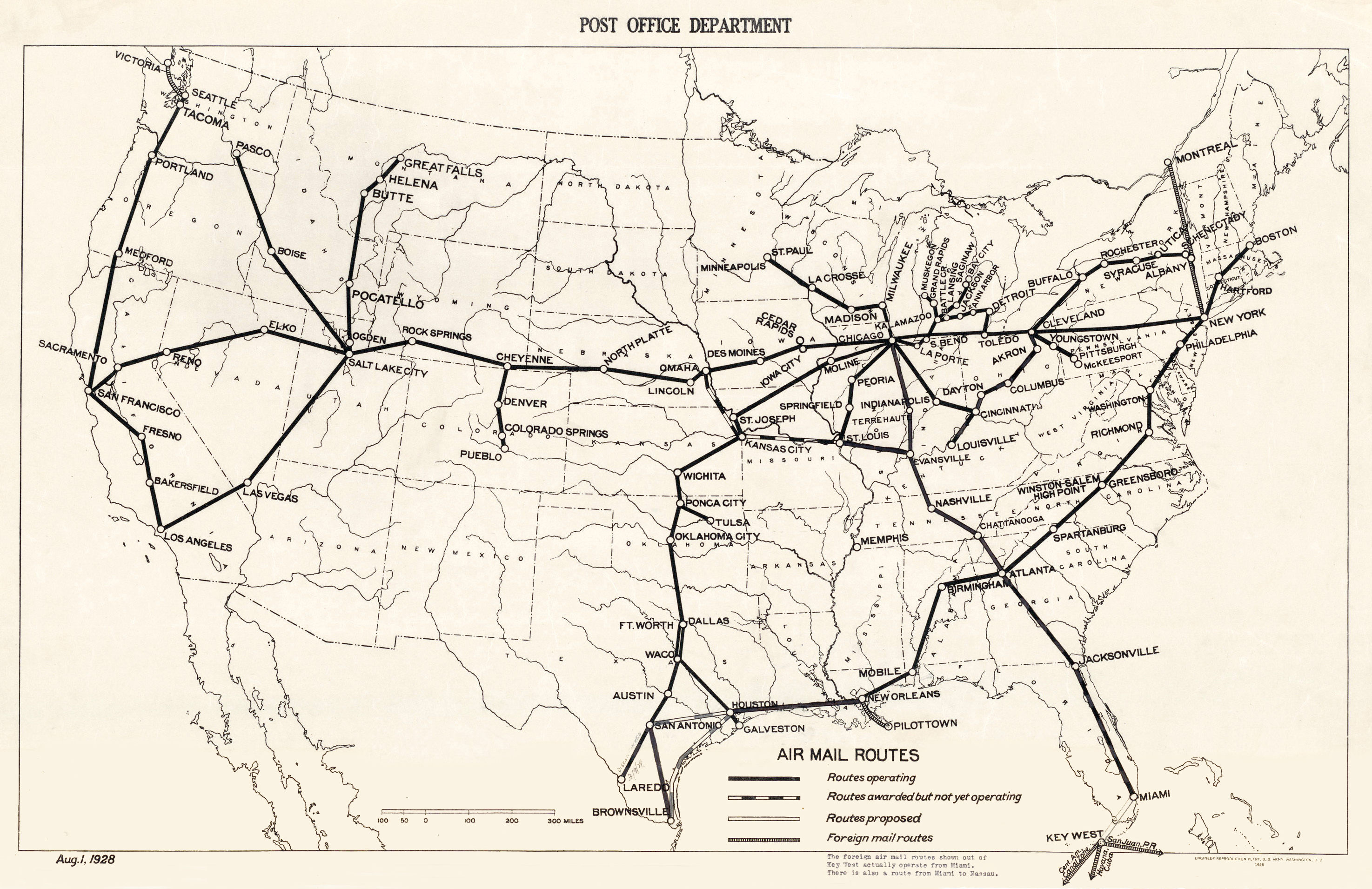
USPOD air mail route map of August 1928

As safety and capability grew, daytime-only operations gave way to flying at night, assisted by airway beacons and lighted emergency landing fields. Regular transcontinental air mail delivery began in 1924. In 1925, to encourage commercial aviation, the Kelly Act (also known as the Air Mail Act of 1925) authorized the Post Office Department to contract with private airlines for feeder routes into the main transcontinental system. The first commercial air mail flight was on the 487-mile (784 km) route CAM (Contract Air Mail) No. 5 from Pasco, Washington, to Elko, Nevada, on April 6, 1926. By 1927 the transition had been completed to entirely commercial transport of mail, and by 1929 45 airlines were involved in mail delivery at a cost per mile of $1.10 (equivalent to $21 in 2025). Most were small, under-capitalized companies flying short routes and old equipment.

Subsidies for carrying mail exceeded the cost of the mail itself, and some carriers abused their contracts by flooding the system with junk mail at 100% profit or hauling heavy freight as air mail. Historian Oliver E. Allen, in his book The Airline Builders, estimated that airlines would have had to charge a 150-pound (68 kg) passenger $450 per ticket (equal to $8,438 in 2025 dollars) in lieu of carrying an equivalent amount of mail.

=== William P. MacCracken Jr. ===
William P. MacCracken Jr. became the first federal regulator of commercial aviation when then-secretary of commerce Herbert Hoover named him the first assistant secretary of commerce for aeronautics in 1926. During World War I he had served as a flight instructor, had served on the Chicago Aeronautical Commission, and was a member of the board of governors of the National Aeronautical Association when selected by Hoover.

MacCracken left the Commerce Department in 1929 and returned to his private law practice, where he continued to be involved in the growth of commercial aviation by representing many major airlines.

Postmaster General Walter Folger Brown sought to improve the efficiency of the air mail carriers in furtherance of a national transportation plan. Requiring an informed intermediary, Brown asked MacCracken to preside over what was later scandalized as the Spoils Conferences, to work out an agreement between the carriers and the Post Office to consolidate air mail routes into transcontinental networks operated by the best-equipped and financially stable companies. This relationship left both exposed to charges of favoritism. When MacCracken later refused to testify before the Senate, he was found in contempt of Congress.

=== Air Mail Act of 1930 ===
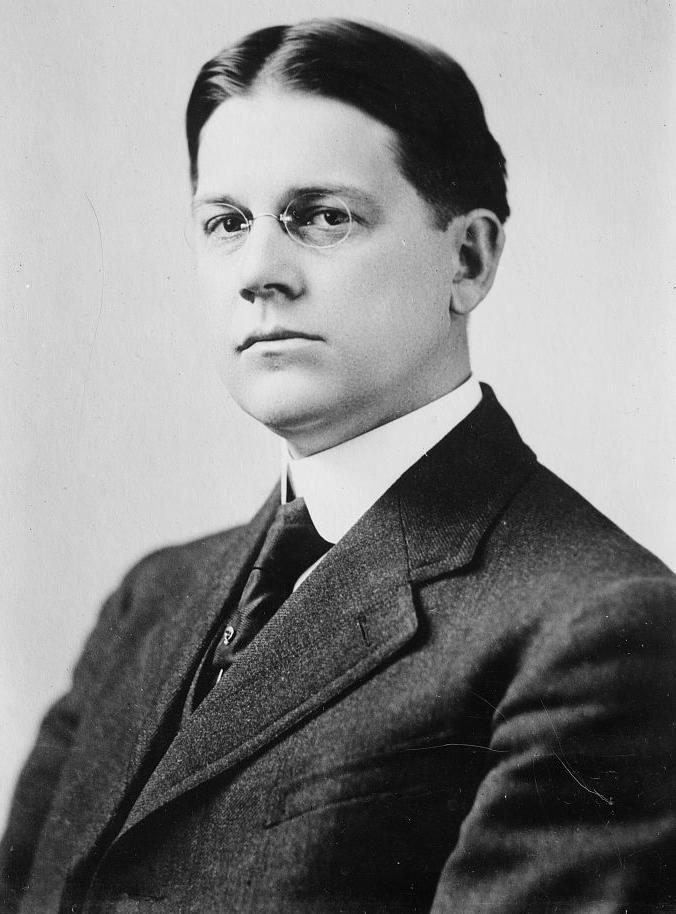
Walter Folger Brown

Hoover appointed Brown as postmaster general in 1929. In 1930, with the nation's airlines apparently headed for extinction in the face of a severe economic downturn and citing inefficient, expensive subsidized air mail delivery, Brown requested supplementary legislation to the 1925 act granting him authority to change postal policy. The Air Mail Act of 1930, passed on April 29 and known as the McNary-Watres Act after its chief sponsors, Sen. Charles L. McNary of Oregon and Rep. Laurence H. Watres of Pennsylvania, authorized the postmaster general to enter into longer-term airmail contracts with rates based on space or volume, rather than weight. The Act gave Brown strong authority (some argued almost dictatorial powers) over the nationwide air transportation system.

The main provision of the Air Mail Act changed the manner in which payments were calculated. Air mail carriers would be paid for having sufficient cargo capacity on their planes, whether the planes carried mail or flew empty, a disincentive to carry mail since the carrier received a set fee for a plane of a certain size whether or not it carried mail. The purpose of the provision was to discourage the carrying of bulk junk mail to boost profits, particularly by the smaller and inefficient carriers, and to encourage the carrying of passengers. Airlines using larger planes designed to carry passengers would increase their revenues by carrying more passengers and less mail. Awards would be made to the “lowest responsible bidder” that had owned an airline operated on a daily schedule of at least 250 miles (402 kilometers) for at least six months.

A second provision allowed any airmail carrier with an existing contract of at least two years standing to exchange its contract for a “route certificate” giving it the right to haul mail for 10 additional years. The third and most controversial provision gave Brown authority to "extend or consolidate" routes in effect according to his own judgment.

Within days of its passage, United Aircraft and Transport Company (UATC) acquired the controlling interest of National Air Transport after a brisk but brief struggle between UATC and Clement M. Keys of NAT. The merger, begun in February 1930 to plug the only gap in UATC's cross-country network of airlines, had been amicable until three weeks before its finalization, when Keys reversed his initial approval. Ironically Brown was angered by the negotiations, worried that the specter of a potential monopoly would endanger the imminent passage of the Air Mail Act. The merger swiftly created the first transcontinental airline.

On May 19, three weeks after the passage of McNary-Watres, at the first of the "Spoils Conferences", Brown invoked his authority under the third provision to consolidate the air mail routes to only three major companies independently competing with each other, with the goal of forcing the plethora of small, inefficient carriers to merge with the larger. Further meetings between the larger carriers, presided over by Assistant Secretary of Commerce for Aeronautics William P. MacCracken Jr., continued into June that often developed into harsh wrangling over route distribution proposals and consequent animosity towards Brown.

After what was described as a "shotgun marriage" between Transcontinental Air Transport and Western Air Express in July to achieve the second of the three companies (UATC was the first), competitive bids were solicited by the Post Office on August 2, 1930, and opened August 25. A surprise competitive bidding struggle ensued between UATC, through a quickly formed skeleton company it called "United Aviation," and the newly merged Transcontinental and Western Air over the central transcontinental route. After initial rejection of the Postmaster General's decision, final approval of the contract award to T&WA was approved by Comptroller General of the United States John R. McCarl on January 10, 1931, on the basis that United's puppet concern was not a "responsible bidder" by the definition of McNary-Watres, in effect validating Brown's restructuring.

These three carriers later evolved into United Airlines (the northern airmail route, CAMs 17 and 18), Trans World Airlines (the mid-United States route, CAM 34) and American Airlines (the southern route, CAM 33). (Note: The August 1930 bid was jointly awarded to the Southwest Air Fast Express, or SAFE Way, owned by Erle P. Halliburton, and Robertson Aircraft Corporation, like American a subsidiary of the Avco holding company. SAFE Way was acquired by American at a premium price on August 23, 1930, two days before the bids were opened, and both lines were reorganized by American as Southern Air Fast Express.) Brown also extended the southern route to the West Coast. He awarded bonuses for carrying more passengers and purchasing multi-engined aircraft equipped with radios and navigation aids. By the end of 1932, the airline industry was the one sector of the economy experiencing steady growth and profitability, described by one historian as "Depression-proof." Passenger miles, the numbers of passengers, and new airline employees had all tripled over 1929. Airmail itself, despite its image to many Americans as a frivolous luxury for the few remaining affluent, had doubled following restructuring. Much of this if not all was the result of the postal subsidies, funded by taxpayers.

=== Congressional investigation ===
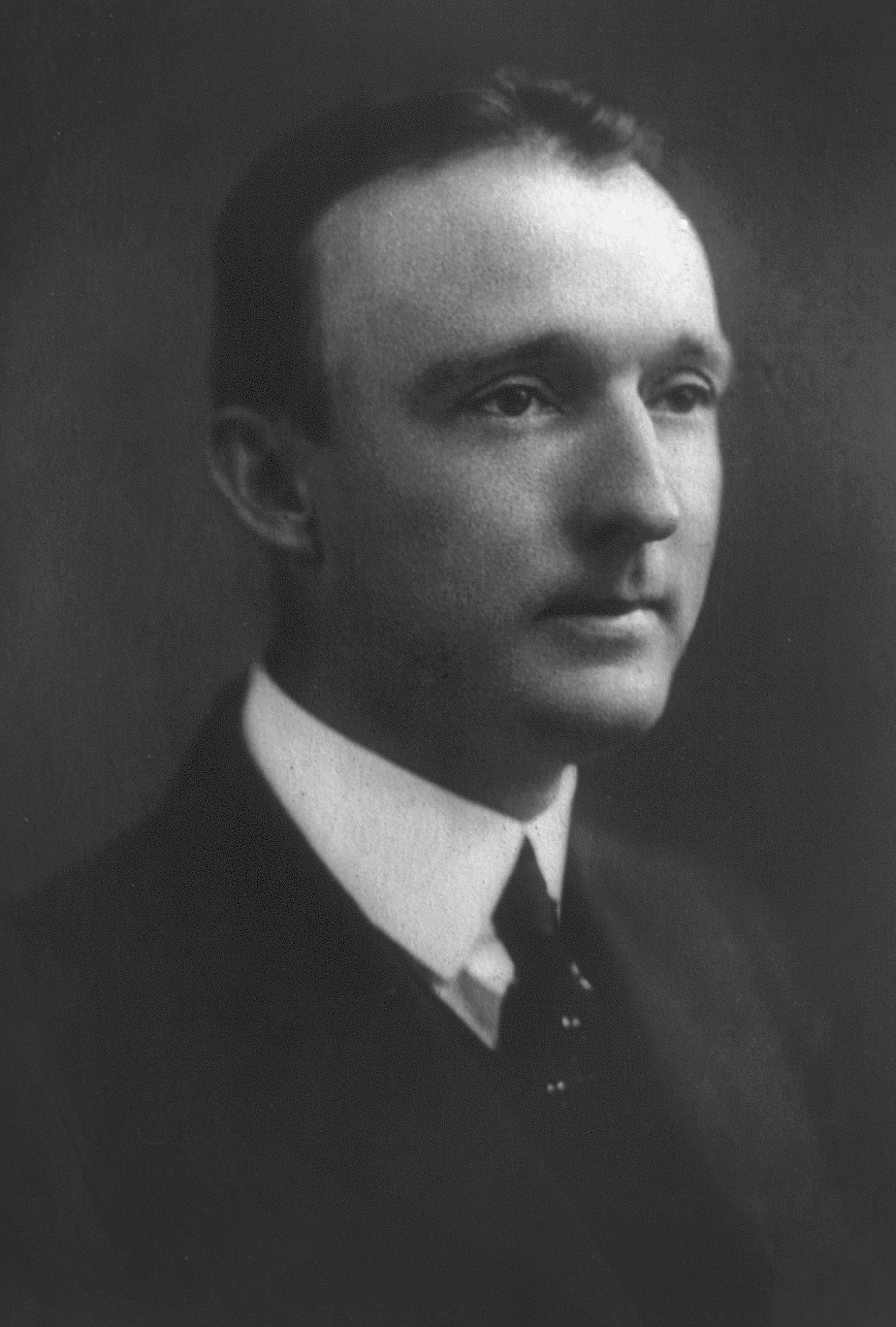
Senator Hugo Black

The air mail scandal began when an officer of the New York Philadelphia and Washington Airway Corporation, known as the Ludington Airline, was having a drink with friend and Hearst newspaper reporter Fulton Lewis Jr. Ludington Airline, established and owned by brothers Townsend and Nicholas Ludington, began offering an hourly daytime passenger shuttle on September 1, 1930, just two weeks after Eastern Air Transport (EAT) began its first passenger operations between New York City and Richmond, Virginia. Using seven Stinson SM-6000B tri-motors, Ludington Airline became the first U. S. airline in history to make a profit carrying nothing but passengers. However it began operating in the red when the novelty of cheap air travel wore off as the Great Depression deepened and competition with arch-rival EAT intensified. The Ludington officer mentioned to Lewis that in 1931 the carrier could not get a proposed "express service" air mail contract to extend CAM 25 (Miami to Washington via Atlanta) to Newark, New Jersey, not even by submitting a low bid of 25 cents a mile. Ludington's general manager, former Air Service aviator Eugene L. Vidal, eager to curtail Ludington's growing losses with a lucrative mail subsidy, had offered the extremely low bid to Brown in order to demonstrate Ludington's commitment to the route extension plan "at or below cost." (Note: The concept for the shuttle was Vidal's. He and veteran airmail pilot Paul Collins had left the financially strapped Transcontinental Air Transport in 1930 and persuaded the Ludington brothers to financially back Vidal's idea on an experimental basis. Amelia Earhart also left T.A.T. at the same time, investing in the company, and Vidal appointed her as a vice-president. After Ludington failed to secure the mail contract, he resigned to take an appointment in the Aeronautics Branch within the Department of Commerce, becoming its director in September 1933 on Earhart's recommendation to FDR, a position he held when the scandal broke. In the summer of 1934 the Aeronautics Branch was renamed the Bureau of Air Commerce. Earhart and Vidal were close friends from her hire at T.A.T. in 1929 until her disappearance in 1937, and were the object of frequent speculation that they were lovers. (Winters, p. 146))

Lewis did not think much about the conversation until he later read the Post Office Department's announcement that had awarded Ludington's arch-rival the CAM 25 air mail route contract at 89 cents a mile as measured against Ludington's extremely low bid. By February 1933 Ludington was virtually bankrupt and sold out to EAT for a "bottom basement price of $260,000." Lewis sensed there was a story to be written. He brought the story to the attention of William Randolph Hearst and, although Hearst would not print it, was given approval to investigate the story full-time. (Note: Brown testified to the Black Committee that the CAM 25 decision was based on Eastern's scheduling the entire route to Miami, Florida, while Ludington planned to use only the New York-Washington leg.)

Lewis' investigation began to develop into an air mail contract scandal. Lewis was having difficulty impressing his findings on government officials until he approached Alabama Senator Hugo Black. Black was the chairman of a special committee established to investigate ocean mail contracts awarded by the federal government to the merchant marine. Interstate Commerce Commission investigators seized records from all the mail carriers on September 28, 1933, (Note: Investigator Andrew G. Patterson, a former Alabama sheriff, was delegated to assist the special committee and led the seizures. He was a staunch progressive Democrat and an anti-monopolist who viewed air mail as frivolous and subsidies a waste of taxpayer money, and could see no correlation between it and transporting passengers. (Van der Linden, p. 177)) and brought about public awareness of what became known as "the Black Committee". (Note: The committee was officially "The Special Committee to Investigate Air-Mail and Ocean-Mail Contracts, United States Senate, 73rd Congress, 2nd Session".) The special Senate committee investigated alleged improprieties and gaming of the rate structure, such as carriers padlocking individual pieces of mail to increase weight. Despite showing that Brown's administration of the air mail had increased the efficiency of the service and lowered its costs from $1.10 to $0.54 per mile, and the obvious partisan politics involved in investigating what appeared to be a Republican scandal involving Herbert Hoover by a Democratic-controlled committee, the hearings raised serious questions regarding its legality and ethics.

Black announced that he had found evidence of "fraud and collusion" between the Hoover Administration and the airlines and held public hearings in January 1934, although these allegations were later found to be without basis. Near the end of the hearings on the last day of January, MacCracken was subpoenaed to testify duces tecum "instanter" and appeared, but refused to produce files, citing attorney-client privilege unless the clients waived the privilege (which all did within a week of his appearance). However, the next day MacCracken's law partner gave Northwest Airways vice president Lewis H. Brittin permission to go into MacCracken's files to remove a memo that Brittin claimed was personal and unrelated to the investigation. Brittin later tore up the memo and discarded it. Black charged MacCracken with Contempt of Congress on February 5 and ordered him arrested. During a five-day trial the Senate deemed him a lobbyist not protected by lawyer-client privilege and voted to convict him. (Note: Black and MacCracken were close personal friends. In addition to charging MacCracken with contempt, Black also named Brittin along with two officials of Western Air Express, president Harris M. Hanshue and his secretary Gilbert L. Givvin, who had also removed files. MacCracken and Brittin were convicted for "destroying evidence" (the memo in question contained no evidence of fraud or criminal collusion but was personally embarrassing to Brittin) and sentenced to ten days in jail. The WAE officers were acquitted because they returned their files intact to MacCracken. Brittin served his ten days without appeal but MacCracken filed a writ of habeas corpus against his arrest which led to the historic case Jurney v. MacCracken (Chesley E. Jurney was the Senate sergeant-at-arms, and also a friend of MacCracken's) in which the U.S. Supreme Court denied the writ. MacCracken served ten days in jail and was the last citizen arrested for "inherent" contempt of Congress over an 80-year period. (Zuckerman, "The Court of Congressional Contempt", Introduction))

Disregarding as Black did the fact that all but two of the existing contracts (the controversial transcontinental mail routes CAM 33 and CAM 34) had been awarded to the low bidder by Postmaster General Harry S. New during the Coolidge Administration, on February 7, 1934, Roosevelt's postmaster general, James A. Farley, announced that he and President Roosevelt were committed to protecting the public interest and that as a result of the investigation, President Roosevelt had ordered the cancellation of all domestic air mail contracts. However, not stated to the public was that the decision had overridden Farley's recommendation that it be delayed until June 1, by which time new bids could have been received and processed for continued civilian mail transport.

== Use of the Army Air Corps ==
=== Executive Order 6591 ===
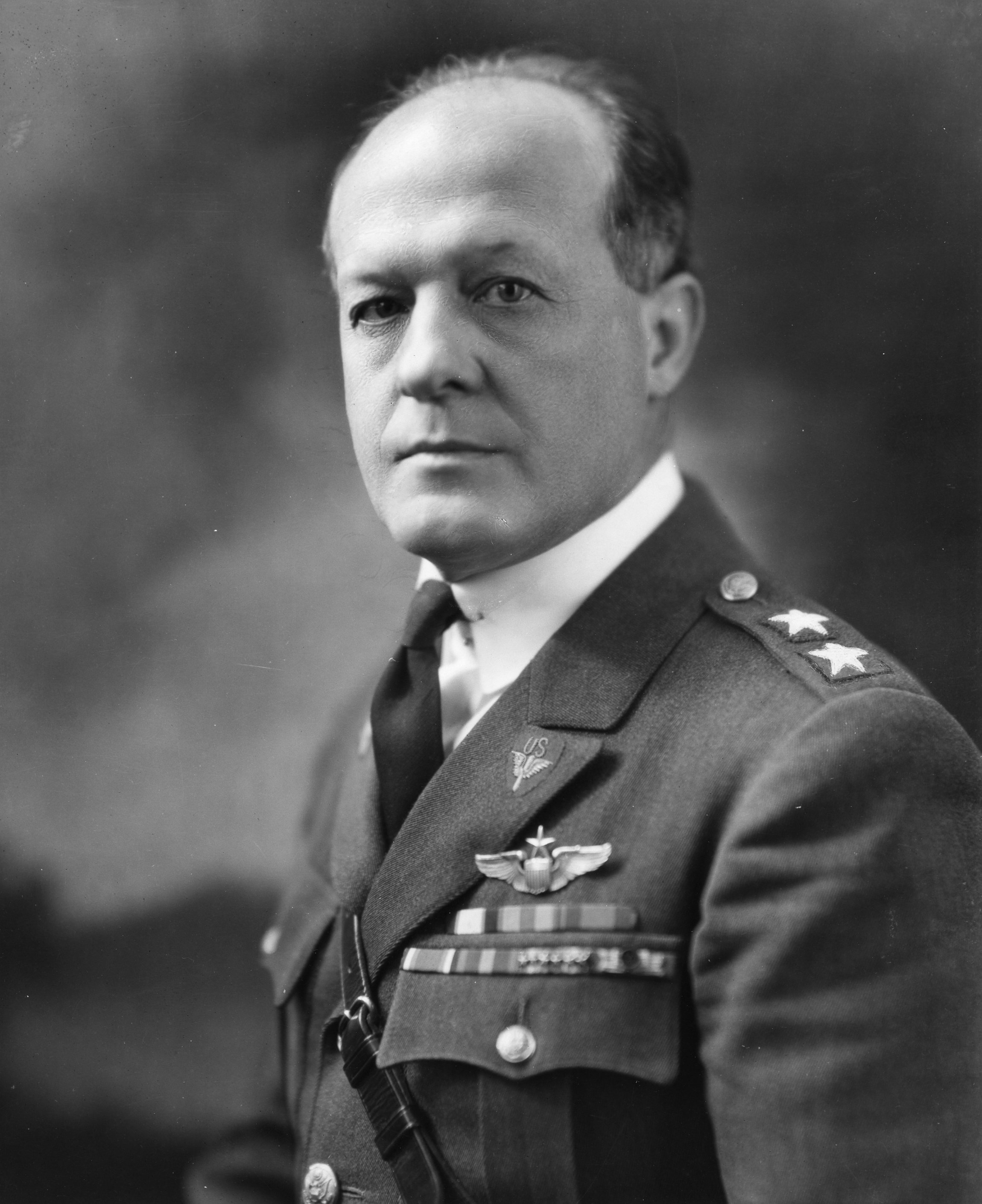
Major General Benjamin D. Foulois, Chief of the Air Corps

Without consulting either Army Chief of Staff Douglas MacArthur or Chief of the Air Corps Major General Benjamin Foulois, Secretary of War George H. Dern at a cabinet meeting on the morning of February 9, 1934, assured President Roosevelt that the Air Corps could deliver the mail. That same morning, shortly after conclusion of the cabinet meeting, second assistant postmaster general Harllee Branch called Foulois to his office. A conference between members of the Air Corps, the Post Office, and the Aeronautics Branch of the Commerce Department ensued in which Foulois, asked if the Air Corps could deliver the mail in winter, casually assured Branch that the Air Corps could be ready in a week or ten days.

At 4 o'clock that afternoon President Roosevelt suspended the airmail contracts effective at midnight February 19. He issued Executive Order 6591 ordering the War Department to place at the disposal of the Postmaster General "such air airplanes, landing fields, pilots and other employees and equipment of the Army of the United States needed or required for the transportation of mail during the present emergency, by air over routes and schedules prescribed by the Postmaster General." (Note: Congress enacted legislation on March 27, 1934 (48 Stat. 508) effective for one year and authorizing the Postmaster General to fund the operation from his appropriations, providing benefits to Army personnel killed or injured during the operation, and including Reserve officers called up for the operation as active duty members retroactive to February 10, 1934.)

=== Preparation and plans ===
In 1933 the airlines carried several million pounds of mail on 26 routes covering almost 25,000 miles (40,000 km) of airways. Transported mostly by night, the mail was carried in modern passenger planes equipped with modern flight instruments and radios, using ground-based beam transmitters as navigation aids. The airlines had a well-established system of maintenance facilities along their routes.

Initial plans were made for the Air Corps to cover 18 mail routes totaling nearly 12,000 miles (19,000 km); and 62 flights daily, 38 by night. On February 14, five days before the Air Corps was to begin, General Foulois appeared before the House of Representatives Post Office Committee outlining the steps taken by the Air Corps in preparation. In his testimony he assured the committee that the Air Corps had selected its most experienced pilots and that it had the requisite experience at flying at night and in bad weather.

In actuality, of the 262 pilots eventually used, 140 were Reserve junior officers with less than two years flying experience. Most were second lieutenants and only one held a rank higher than first lieutenant. (Note: Major Charles B. Oldfield, a regional commander in the Western Zone.) The Air Corps had made a decision not to draw from its training schools, where most of its experienced pilots were assigned. Only 48 of those selected had logged at least 25 hours of flight time in bad weather, only 31 had 50 hours or more of night flying, and only 2 had 50 hours of instrument time.

Air Corps roundel

The Air Corps during the Great Depression, hampered by pay cuts and a reduction of flight time, operated almost entirely in daylight and good weather. Duty hours were limited and relaxed, usually with four hours or less of flight operations a day, and none on weekends. Experience levels were also limited because the Air Corps flew obsolete aircraft, most of them single-engine and open cockpit planes. Because of a high turnover-rate policy in the War Department, most pilots were Reserve officers and were unfamiliar with the civilian airmail routes.

Regarding equipment, the Air Corps had 274 Directional gyros and 460 Artificial horizons in its inventory, but very few of these were mounted in aircraft. It possessed 172 radio transceivers, almost all with a range of 30 miles (48 km) or less. Foulois eventually ordered the available equipment to be installed in the 122 aircraft assigned to the task, but the instruments were not readily available and Air Corps mechanics unfamiliar with the equipment sometimes installed them incorrectly or without regard for standardization of cockpit layout.

The project, termed AACMO (Army Air Corps Mail Operation), was placed under the supervision of Brigadier General Oscar Westover, assistant chief of the Air Corps. He created three geographic zones and appointed Lieutenant Colonel Henry H. Arnold to command the Western Zone, Lieutenant Colonel Horace M. Hickam the Central Zone, and Major Byron Q. Jones (Note: Jones had joined the Aviation Section, U.S. Signal Corps in 1914 but was becoming disenchanted with the Air Corps. In 1939 he transferred back to the Cavalry.) the Eastern Zone. Personnel and planes were immediately deployed, but problems began immediately with a lack of proper facilities (and in some instances, no facilities at all) for maintenance of aircraft and quartering of enlisted men, and a failure of tools to arrive where needed.

Sixty Air Corps pilots took oaths as postal employees in preparation for the service and began training. On February 16, three pilots on familiarization flights were killed in crashes attributed to bad weather. (Note: 2nd Lts Jean D. Grenier and Edwin D. White crashed their A-12 into Weber Canyon, Utah, and 1st Lt. James Y. Eastham crashed short of the runway at Jerome, Idaho, in a Douglas Y1B-7 bomber.) This presaged some of the worst and most persistent late winter weather in history.

Further attention was drawn to the startup when the airlines delivered a "parting shot" in the form of a publicity stunt to remind the public of its efficiency in mail service. World War I legend Eddie Rickenbacker, a vice president of North American Aviation (Eastern Air Transport's parent holding company) and Jack Frye of Transcontinental and Western Air, both of which had lost their mail contracts, flew T&WA's prototype Douglas DC-1 airliner "City of Los Angeles," which was still in flight test, across the country on the last evening before the Air Corps operation began. Carrying a partial load of mail and a passenger list of airlines officials and news reporters, they flew from Douglas Aviation's plant at Burbank, California, to Newark, New Jersey. Bypassing several regular stops to stay ahead of a blizzard, the stunt established a new cross-country time record of just over 13 hours, breaking the old record by more than five hours. The DC-1 arrived on the morning of February 19, only two hours before the Air Corps was forced by the winter weather to cancel the startup of AACMO.

=== Blizzard conditions ===
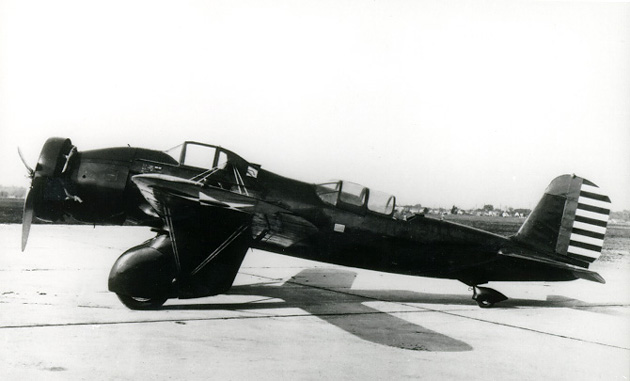
Curtiss A-12 Shrike

On February 19, the blizzard disrupted the initial day's operations east of the Rocky Mountains, where the scheduled first flight of the operation from Newark was cancelled. AACMO's actual first effort left from Kansas City, Missouri, carrying 39 pounds of mail to St. Louis. Kenneth Werrell noted of the first flight out of Cleveland: "The pilot on the first air mail flight needed three tries and three aircraft to get aloft. Ten minutes later, he returned with a failed gyro compass and cockpit lights, and obtained a flashlight to read the instruments." Snow, rain, fog, and turbulent winds hampered flying operations for the remainder of the month over much of the United States. The route from Cleveland to Newark over the Allegheny Mountains was dubbed "Hell's Stretch" by airmail pilots.

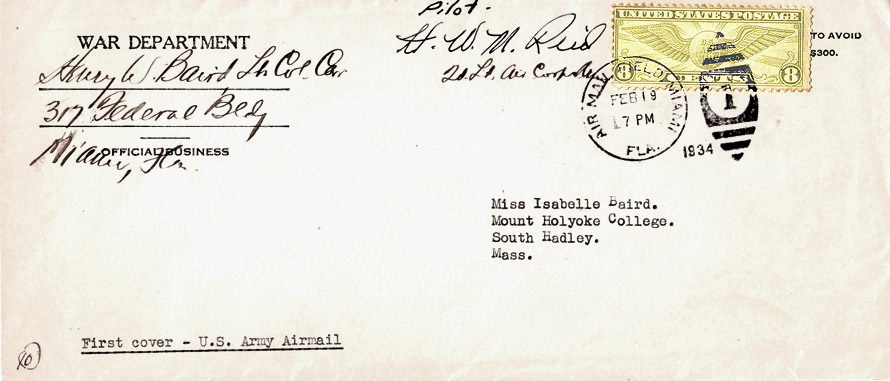
Cover flown from Miami to Boston on the first day of emergency Army Air Mail service on February 19, 1934

In the Western Zone, Arnold established his headquarters in Salt Lake City. In the winter of 1932–1933, he and many of his pilots had gained winter flying experience flying food-drop missions to aid Indian reservation settlements throughout the American Southwest isolated by blizzards. As a result of this experience and direct supervision, Arnold's zone was the only one in which a pilot was not killed.

The Western Zone's first flights were made using 18 Boeing P-12 fighters, but these could carry a maximum of only 50 pounds of mail each, and even that amount made them tail-heavy. After one week they were replaced by Douglas O-38 variants including the Douglas O-35 and its bomber version, the B-7, and Douglas O-25C observation biplanes borrowed from the National Guard. In both the Western and Eastern zones, these became the aircraft of choice, modified to carry 160 pounds of mail in their rear cockpits, and in their nose (bombardier/navigator) compartments where those existed. Better-suited planes such as the new Martin YB-10 bomber and Curtiss A-12 Shrike ground attack aircraft were in insufficient numbers to be of practical use. Two YB-10s crashlanded when pilots forgot to lower its retractable landing gear, and there were only enough A-12s for a partial squadron in the Central Zone. (Note: Major Oldfield was one of the two pilots, at Cheyenne on April 23. Despite the accident, the next year he was promoted to lieutenant colonel and assigned command of the 2nd Bomb Group.)

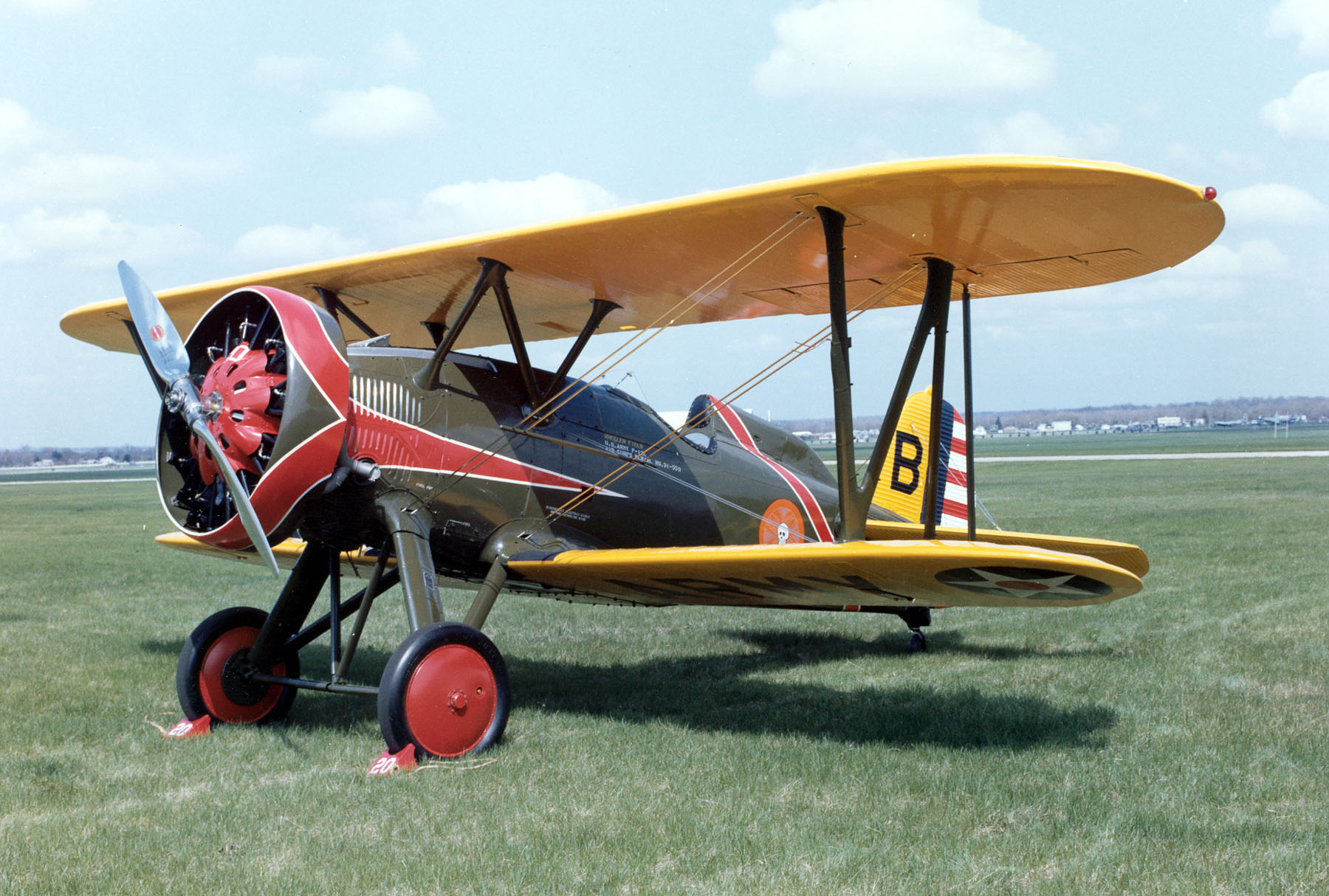
Boeing P-12

On February 22 a young pilot departing Chicago in an O-39 flew into a snow storm over Deshler, Ohio, and became lost after his navigational radio failed. Fifty miles off course, he bailed out but his parachute caught on the tail section of his airplane and he was killed. That same day in Denison, Texas, another pilot attempting a forced landing was killed when his P-26A flipped over on soft turf. The next day, a Douglas C-29 Dolphin took off from Floyd Bennett Field, New York on a flight to Langley Field to ferry a mail aircraft and ditched when both engines failed a mile off of Rockaway Beach. Waiting for a rescue attempt in heavy seas, the passenger on the amphibian drowned. (Note: 2nd Lt. Durwood O. Lowry died in Ohio, 2nd Lt. Fred I. Patrick in Texas, and 2nd Lt. George P. McDermott in New York.)

President Roosevelt, publicly embarrassed, ordered a meeting with Foulois that resulted in a reduction of routes and schedules (which were already only 60% of that flown by the airlines), and strict flight safety rules. Among the new rules were restrictions on night flying: forbidding pilots with less than two years' experience from being scheduled except under clear conditions, prohibiting takeoffs in inclement weather, and requiring fully functional instruments and radio to continue on in poor conditions. Control officers on the ground were made responsible for enforcement of the restrictions in their areas.

=== Suspension of the operation ===
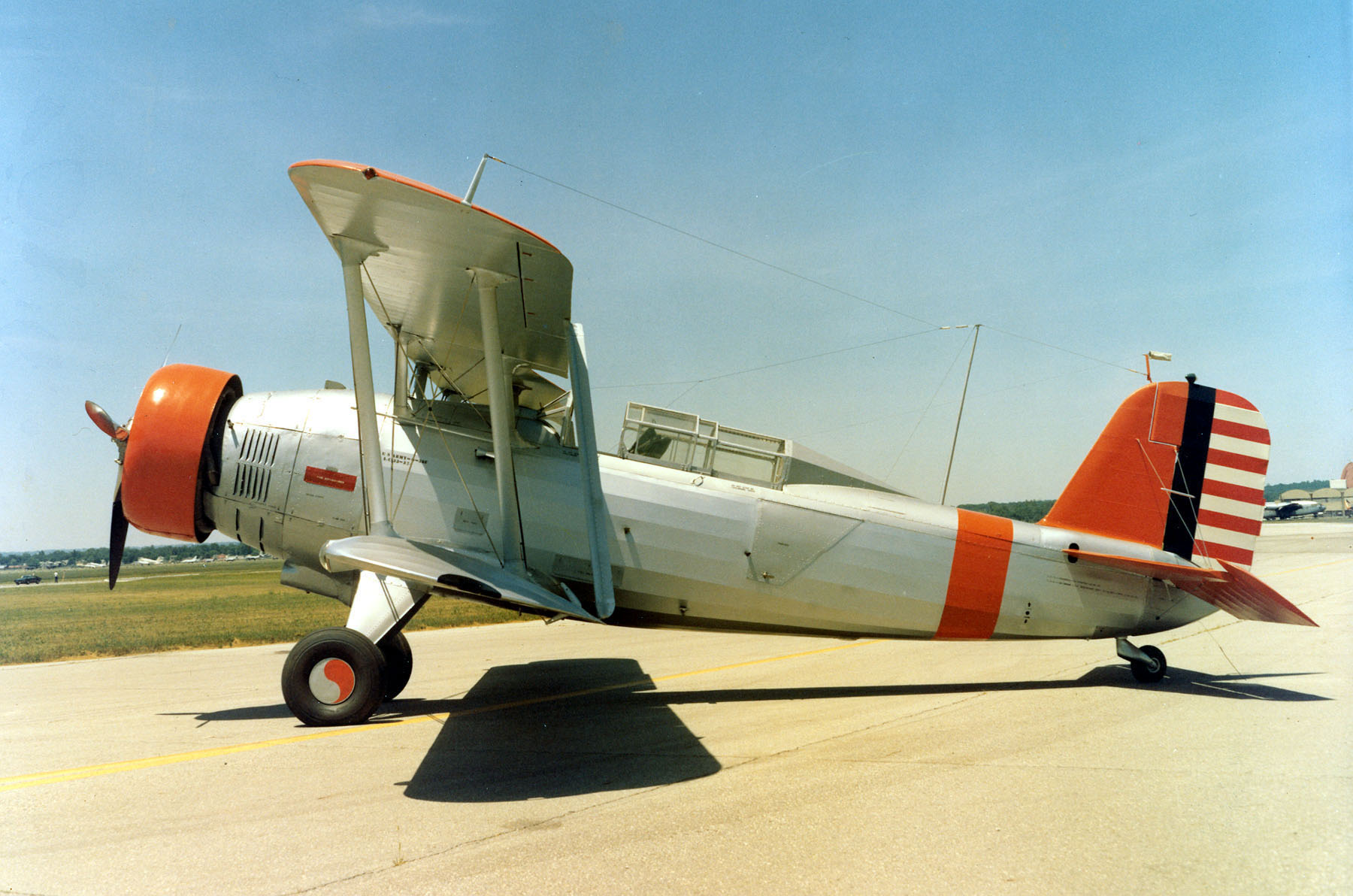
Douglas O-38

On March 8 and 9, 1934, four more pilots died in crashes, (Note: Lts. Frank L. Howard and Arthur R. Kerwin, Jr. in the crash of an O-38E at Salt Lake City, Lt. Otto Weineke in an O-39 at Burton, Ohio, and Pvt. Ernest B. Sell, a flight engineer on a Keystone B-6 in a cyprus swamp near Daytona Beach, Florida. Sell's death occurred during a crash-landing while he was using a hand pump to transfer fuel from a full tank to an empty one during a fuel line malfunction. (Tate, p. 132)) totaling ten fatalities in less than one million miles of flying the mail. (Meanwhile, the crash of an American Airlines airliner on March 9, also killing four, went virtually unnoticed in the press.) Rickenbacker was quoted as calling the program "legalized murder", which became a catchphrase for criticism of the Roosevelt administration's handling of the crisis. Aviation icon and former air mail pilot Charles A. Lindbergh stated in a telegram to Secretary of War Dern that using the Air Corps to carry mail was "unwarranted and contrary to American principles." Even though both had close ties to the airline industry, their criticisms seriously stung the Roosevelt Administration. (Note: Lindbergh was a salaried consultant and stockholder to both TWA and Pan American Airways. His telegram to Dern was made public by Newsweek Magazine. Sources: Tate 1998, p. 133 ("legalized murder"), p. 144 (Lindbergh), p. 155 (Newsweek).)

On March 10, President Roosevelt called Foulois and Army Chief of Staff General Douglas MacArthur to the White House, asking them to fly only in completely safe conditions. Foulois replied that to ensure complete safety the Air Corps would have to end the flights, and Roosevelt suspended airmail service on March 11, 1934. Foulois wrote in his autobiography that he and MacArthur incurred "the worst tongue-lashing I ever received in all my military service". Norman E. Borden, in Air Mail Emergency of 1934, wrote: "To lessen the attacks on Roosevelt and Farley, Democratic leaders in both houses of Congress and Post Office officials placed the blame for all that had gone wrong on the shoulders of Foulois." Other supporters of the president outside of the government muted criticism of the administration by focusing on and excoriating Lindbergh, who had also made headlines by publicly protesting the cancellation of the contracts two days after they were announced, "as if his telegram had caused the deaths."

Despite an 11th fatality from a training crash in Wyoming on March 17, (Note: 2nd Lt. Harold G. Richardson died when his O-38E spun in at low altitude. A recent co-pilot with United Airlines, Richardson was a Reservist called to active duty after being laid-off because of the mail contracts cancellations.) the Army resumed the program again on March 19, 1934, in better weather, using only nine routes, (Note: These routes were Chicago-New York, Chicago-San Francisco, Chicago-Dallas, Salt Lake City-San Diego, Salt Lake City-Seattle, Cheyenne-Denver, New York-Boston, New York-Atlanta, and Atlanta-Jacksonville.) limited schedules, and hurried improvements in instrument flying. (Note: The prevailing attitude among Air Corps senior leadership was that reliance on instruments made for weak pilots, leading to a neglect of training and lack of experience. That attitude had begun to change with the introduction of training to create instrument instructors, but the second such class was only halfway through its 6-week course when AACMO began. The week's suspension availed the Air Corps an opportunity to install instruments and familiarize pilots with their use. Both were hastily accomplished, however, with nonstandard and often questionable results. (Werrell)) The O-38E, which had been involved in two fatal accidents at Cheyenne, Wyoming, was withdrawn completely from the operation despite its enclosed cockpit because of its propensity to go into an unrecoverable spin in the mountainous terrain. (Note: The O-38E was not designed to carry extra equipment or loads, and so used its small baggage compartment and rear cockpit to transport mail. The aircraft was difficult to hold level at higher altitude, causing it to whipstall (an unintentional tailslide), and the improperly distributed weight quickly brought about a spin that needed a minimum of 2000 feet to recover.) In early April the Air Corps removed all pilots with less than two years' experience from the operation.

The Air Corps began drawing down AACMO on May 8, 1934, when temporary contracts with private carriers were put into effect. (Note: The temporary contracts were awarded on April 20 by Postmaster General Farley, under the Air Mail Act of 1930, at a meeting with invited carriers only that critics found not unlike the "spoils conference" that began the controversy. (Van der Linden, p. 284; Duffy, pp. 39-40)) On AACMO's last night of coast-to-coast service on May 7–8, YB-10s were used on four of the six legs from Oakland, California, to Newark to match Rickenbacker and Frye's DC-1 stunt, flying a greater number of miles and making three extra stops in just an hour's more time. (Note: The airlines took the final B-10 flights as a challenge. The next day, on resumption of TWA mail operations, Jack Frye bettered both the B-10's time and his own of February 19, flying from Los Angeles to Newark in only eleven and a half hours.(Duffy, p. 41)) Only two additional Army pilots were killed flying the mail after the resumption of operations, on March 30 and April 5. (Note: The March 30 fatality occurred 140 miles west of Chicago when 2nd Lt. Thurman A. Wood encountered a thunderstorm, reversed course in an attempt to evade it, and flew into the ground near DeWitt, Iowa. The last air mail fatality happened in "Hell's Stretch" when 2nd Lt. John Leland McAlister, a Reservist trying to fight his way through bad weather to land at Altoona, Pennsylvania, flew his open-cockpit P-6E into Healy's Mountain near Duncansville. (Werrell))

By May 17 all but one mail route, CAM 9 (Chicago to Fargo, North Dakota (Note: This route had been last operated by Northwest Airways, Lewis H. Brittin's company. When the three-month temporary contract was awarded, it again went to Northwest, now doing business as Northwest Airlines.)), had been restored to civil carriers. AACMO relinquished this last route on June 1, 1934.

=== Results ===
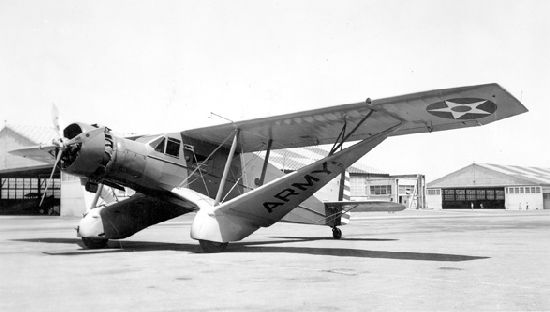
Bellanca C-27C

In all, 66 major accidents, ten of them with fatalities, (Note: By comparison and also conducted in bad weather, the much larger and longer Berlin Airlift resulted in 70 major accidents, 11 of them fatal. (Werrell, note 95)) resulted in 13 crew deaths, (Note: In addition to the 12 deaths commonly listed, Dr. Kenneth P. Werrell documents a 13th on April 5th, which was reported by the Associated Press on April 6 as the "thirteenth mail flyer to die." That is further substantiated by a claim made by the pilot's parents for the "death gratuity" of $500 awarded to families of Reserve officers killed flying the mail, which was awarded by Congress on May 15, 1935.) creating an intense public furor. Only five of the 13 deaths actually occurred on flights carrying mail, (Note: Those of Lowry, Howard and Kerwin, Weineke, and Wood.) but directly and indirectly the air mail operation caused accidental crash deaths in the Air Corps to rise by 15% to 54 in 1934, compared to 46 in 1933 and 47 in 1935. (Note: The rate of deaths per 100,000 hours of flight also rose from 11 to 14, an increase of 28%. Werrell also notes that 1934 was a particularly bad year for aviation safety in general, as civil aviation also had more deaths and a higher fatality rate in comparison to 1933 and 1935.)

In 78 days of operations and over 13,000 hours of logged flight time, completing 65.8 percent of their scheduled flights, the Army Air Corps moved 777,389 pounds of mail over 1,590,155 miles (2,559,106 km). Aircraft employed in carrying the mail were the Curtiss B-2 Condor, Keystone B-4, Keystone B-6, Douglas Y1B-7 and YB-10 bombers; the Boeing P-12 and P-6E fighters; the Curtiss A-12 Shrike; Bellanca C-27C transport; and the Thomas-Morse O-19, Douglas O-25C, O-39, and two models of Douglas O-38 observation aircraft.

Among the 262 Army pilots flying the mail were Ira C. Eaker, Frank A. Armstrong, Elwood R. Quesada, Robert L. Scott, Robert F. Travis, Harold H. George, Beirne Lay Jr., Curtis E. LeMay, and John Waldron Egan, all of whom would play important roles in air operations during the Second World War.

== Consequences and effects ==
=== Effects on the airline industry ===
The government had little choice but to return service to the commercial airlines, but did so with several new conditions. The Air Mail Act of June 12, 1934, drafted at the height of the crisis by Black (and known as the "Black-McKellar bill"), restored competitive bidding, closely regulated airmail labor operations, (Note: This was inclusion of the language of "Decision 83" of the National Labor Board, whose constitutionality (and thus the legal standing of the decision) was under attack in the Supreme Court. Called "the cornerstone of the modern system of airline pilot compensation" (Hopkins, p. 58), Decision 83 limited maximum hours and set a minimum wage for pilots while making unionization of airline pilots a reality. Its inclusion was a reward by FDR to the Air Line Pilots Association (ALPA) for the union's very public support (and only support in the aviation industry) during the struggle. ALPA's history makes clear this was a calculated political move to win its objectives by a union leadership that agreed in principle with Brown on the basic issues, not FDR. (Hopkins, p. 68)) dissolved the holding companies that brought together airlines and aircraft manufacturers, and prevented companies that held the old contracts from obtaining new ones. The new rules were put into effect in March before formal passage of the bill with the announcement that temporary contracts for up to a year would be awarded by Farley. The industry's response, with the tacit consent of the government, was simply to reorganize and change names; for example, Northwest Airways became Northwest Airlines and Eastern Air Transport became Eastern Air Lines. The vertically integrated United Aircraft and Transport Corporation (UATC) appeared to be its particular target and broke up on September 26, 1934, into three companies: United Air Lines Transportation Company, United Aircraft Manufacturing Company, (Note: United Aircraft was a consortium of manufacturers including Pratt & Whitney, Vought, Sikorsky, and Hamilton Standard, and is now RTX Corporation.) and Boeing Aircraft Company.

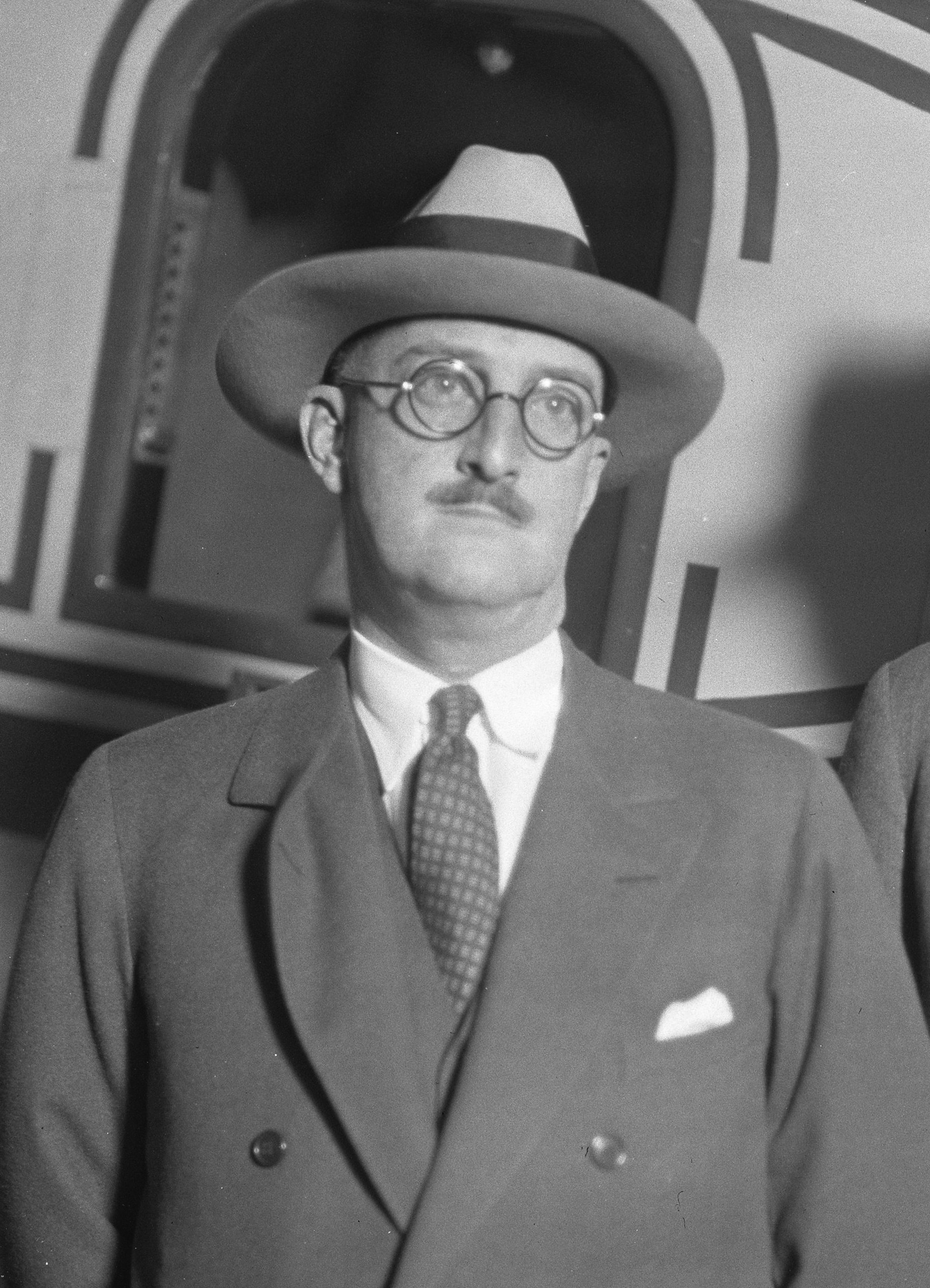
William Boeing

Ironically, of the major carriers present at the "Spoils Conference", all received new contracts for their old routes with the exception of United, "the one airline completely innocent of any possible charge of collusion." (Note: Post Office Solicitor and Fort Worth attorney Karl Crowley held that United's presence at the conference was sufficient evidence of guilt and denied it a hearing to present its case. (Van der Linden, p. 285).) United's routes were awarded instead to regional independents Braniff Airways (Note: The Braniff brothers had been among the earliest and most vocal of the independents complaining of "mistreatment" by Brown and his policies. (Hopkins, p. 68)) and Bowen Air Lines, (Note: Temple Bowen organized Texas Air Transport in 1927 at Austin, Texas, to operate the CAM 21 Dallas to Galveston and CAM 22 Dallas to Brownsville mail routes, and then sold it after a year to Alva Pearl "A.P." Barrett. He formed Bowen Air Lines as a "high speed" carrier in 1930. T.A.T. became Southern Air Transport and merged with the Aviation Corporation (Avco), the holding company for American Airways. (Van der Linden pp. 75-76)) which managed its routes so badly it soon sold out to Braniff. The biggest winner of the scandal was American, owned by Roosevelt campaign contributor "E. L." Cord, who before he acquired American was owner of a small independent carrier and had not attended the spoils conference. (Note: Cord was a notorious stock manipulator and brilliant financier who epitomized the vertical integration targeted by Black and McKellar. Owning both Stinson Aircraft Company and Lycoming Engines, he maneuvered himself into control of Avco in 1932 in a manner similar to UATC's takeover of NAT. Cord had just engineered a merger of his Chicago-based Century Airlines with the Ludington Line that would have made the Philadelphia commuter line (the model for Century's operations) financially sound again and given it the airmail contracts it coveted, but undermined the deal by selling Century to American Airways for stock in Avco, which he parlayed into control of that company and thus American too. This forced Ludington to sell out to EAT and set the stage for the senate investigation from which Cord profited as owner of American when Avco was forced to divest it by the new bidding rules. Ironically, William MacCracken was Ludington's corporate lawyer during these dealings and attempted to secure an express mail contract for Ludington anyway but Congress refused to appropriate the necessary funds. Cord had a reputation as a ruthless employer and created so strong an enmity with his former pilots at Century (many of whom went on to fly for American and used the ALPA to contest corporate abuses) that three years later he sold all his aviation holdings to enter real estate. Despite corporate and labor practices that earned other airline executives punitive measures, Cord retained the support of the Roosevelt Administration. (Van der Linden, pp. 229-235)) American was United's competitor in Dallas, trying to obtain its Chicago-to-Dallas CAM 3 route, and not only retained its contracts but gained a parallel Chicago-to-New York route, a second route from Chicago-to-Dallas with different intermediate stops, and had its southern transcontinental route shortened to reduce its operating costs. (Note: Cord, Crowley, A.P. Barrett, Temple Bowen and the Braniff brothers were all Texas Democrats. When Roosevelt's nomination appeared deadlocked at the 1932 Democratic Convention, the Texans supported a shift of delegates from Speaker of the House John Nance Garner to Roosevelt to ensure his nomination. (Van der Linden, p. 237))

The most punitive measure was to ban all former airline executives alleged to have colluded from further contracts or working for airlines that obtained one. United Airlines' president, Philip G. Johnson, chose to leave the United States and helped to form Trans-Canada Airlines. At the age of 52 William Boeing took early retirement as UATC's chairman of the board on September 18 rather than ever deal again with the federal government. Colonel Paul Henderson was compelled to leave his position as National Air Transport's general manager because he had attended the "spoils conferences," this despite offering damaging testimony against Brown to the Black Committee. The effect of the entire scandal was to guarantee that mail-carrying contracts remained unprofitable, and pushed the entire industry towards carrying passengers, which had been Brown's original goal as incentive for developing new technologies, increasing safety, and growth of the American aircraft manufacturing industry.

Throughout the Black Committee process and a smaller, parallel investigation by the Justice Department directed by special prosecutor Carl. L. Ristine, the allegations of corruption by Lewis and Black were never investigated. The original air mail contracts were instead voided on the basis that they were illegally bid, without revealing what evidence was gathered on which that judgment was made and disregarding that most were obtained by the lowest bidder with the rest through statutory provisions of the Air Mail Act of 1930. The Air Mail Act of 1934 repealed those provisions but, with one exception, the carriers charged with illegally securing contracts under them were permitted to reacquire them despite provisions in the new act forbidding it.

With bidding for contracts more competitive and air mail revenue less attractive than before, the airlines placed a new emphasis on passenger transportation and development of modern airliners. Several sued the government for revenues missed while the Air Corps flew the mail. The Black-McKellar bill sought to marginalize the suits by prohibiting the government from doing business with any carrier that filed them, but after severe criticism the provision was dropped from the bill. On February 4, 1935, almost a year after the contracts were cancelled, the District of Columbia Court of Appeals ruled that the cancellations "amounted to a breach of contract" and a taking of property without due process. The suits went forward, with the last claim settled in 1942. On July 14, 1941, Commissioner Richard H. Akers of the United States Court of Claims found that there had not been any fraud or collusion in the awarding of contracts pursuant to the Air Mail Act of 1930.

Roosevelt also appointed Clark Howell, newspaper editor of the Atlanta Constitution, to chair a five-person committee to investigate all aspects of U.S. civil aviation, resulting in the creation of the Federal Aviation Commission. In severe economic distress, the airlines organized themselves in 1936 into the Air Transport Association of America. Two years later Black-McKellar went the way of McNary-Watres with the passage of the Civil Aeronautics Act, restructuring the airline industry to stress the features championed by Brown in 1930: "government-corporate linkages, limited competition, and restricted entry to the industry."

The Air Line Pilots Association, a union that had publicly supported Roosevelt during the cancellation of the air mail contracts, offered a verdict on the scandal in its history of the union: "The small operators denounced the bidding session of 1930 as a 'spoils conference.' Actually, it was no such thing ... Admittedly, there was an element of ruthlessness in the way (Brown) proceeded, but it was not illegal. Brown succeeded in creating the genesis of a regulated, integrated airline system—a system that FDR would eventually copy. The union of airline pilots was in complete agreement with the policies of Hoover and Brown."

=== Changes in the Air Corps ===
At the time of the scandal, the Air Corps was in a new phase of its continuing struggle with the War Department's General Staff for a more independent role for air operations. Technological developments in aircraft design had recently brought about a superiority in all-metal multi-engine aircraft over single-engine fighters, giving weight to their arguments for becoming an autonomous military service equal to the Army and Navy. The Drum Board, chaired by Deputy Army Chief of Staff General Hugh A. Drum, had proposed a compromise in 1933, recommending activation of the General Headquarters (GHQ) Air Force, a centralized organization that had been part of Army mobilization planning since 1924. Subsequently, a pair of bills were proposed in Congress to increase Air Corps autonomy by expanding its size and authorizing it several administrative functions separate from the rest of the Army, both of which the General Staff adamantly opposed. (Note: These bills were H.R. 7601 and 7872, committee hearings for which were underway during AACMO.)

The immediate results of the operation were disastrous for the image of the Air Corps. Speaker of the House Henry T. Rainey, echoing comments made by Gen. Billy Mitchell, criticized: "If we are unfortunate enough to be drawn into another war, the Air Corps wouldn't amount to much. If it is not equal to carrying the mail, I would like to know what it would do in carrying bombs." (Note: The judgment was not unanimous among professional observers. George Hopkins, a young pilot for American Airlines at the time and an early member of the ALPA, wrote in his history of the union: "After a rocky start, the Army did a pretty good job." (Hopkins, p. 55)) Despite the public humiliation, the Air Mail Fiasco resulted in a number of improvements for the Air Corps, bringing about changes that its previous publicity campaigns were unable to obtain.

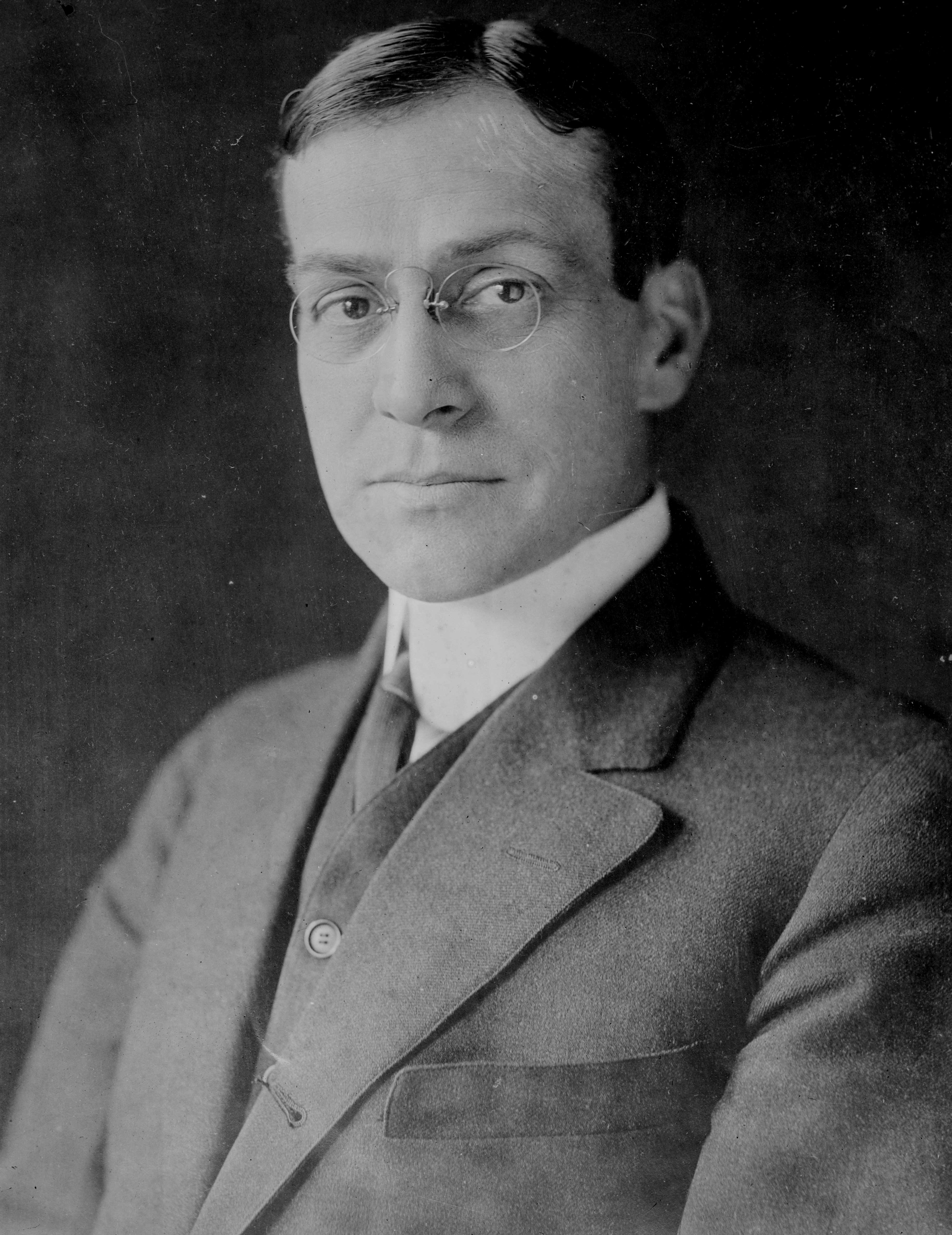
Newton D. Baker

On April 17, 1934, well before AACMO ended, (Note: Dern began putting together the Baker Board as soon as he received the letter from Roosevelt emanating from the March 10 tongue-lashing of MacArthur and Foulois. He hoped to divert attention from the AACMO crisis, especially in Congress where the house hearings on the pending autonomy bills were in full swing, by using an investigative board as Calvin Coolidge had done in 1925 with the Morrow Board during the court-martial of Billy Mitchell. Lindbergh's telegram to Dern was a reply refusing to participate on this board. (Tate, pp. 143-144; Duffy, p. 36)) Secretary Dern convened the "War Department Special Committee on the Army Air Corps," better known as the "Baker Board." Chaired by former Secretary of War Newton D. Baker, the board's announced mission was to examine closely the military air mail operation and the overall condition of the Air Corps. The Baker Board included all five military members of the earlier Drum Board, (Note: The Baker Board consisted of Gen. Drum; Gen. Foulois; Dr. Karl Compton, president of Massachusetts Institute of Technology; Dr. George W. Lewis of the National Advisory Committee for Aeronautics; Clarence Chamberlin; Edgar S. Gorrell, president of Stutz Motor Company and former Air Service officer; James Doolittle, head of Shell Oil's aviation department; Brig. Gen. Charles Kilbourne, Army War Plans Division; Maj. Gen. George S. Simonds, Army War College; and Maj. Gen. John Gulick, Chief of Coast Artillery. (Maurer 1987, p. 300)) four of them senior Army ground force officers who tightly controlled the agenda and scope of the board's investigation to prevent it from becoming a platform for advocating an independent air arm. Of the 12 members, only three were Air Corps advocates. (Note: The three were Foulois, Gorrell and Doolittle. Gorrell wrote the history of Air Service operations in World War I and was the first important advocate of strategic bombing. As a result of his participation on the Baker Board he was asked the following year to head the new Air Transport Association of America, the major trade association for the airline industry. Baker and Compton were named to the board because they were ostensibly "associated with the development of aviation," but primarily to offset Lindbergh's refusal to serve, which was a black eye to both the Administration and the War Department.)

Not surprisingly, the Baker Board endorsed the earlier findings of the Drum Board, supporting the status quo that the Air Corps was an auxiliary force of the Army and opposing the Air Corps becoming a separate service equal to the Army and Navy. It rejected the threat of air attack as a major threat to the national defense or the need of a large air force to defend against it. It opposed any expansion of the Air Corps until the needs of the Army as a whole had been addressed. (Note: Doolittle alone opposed the findings of the report, although Foulois later stated that he wished he had joined Doolittle, who filed a minority report recommending an Air Corps with a separate budget, promotion list, and its own staff separate from the General Staff.) It did however reiterate the Drum Board's recommendation for the immediate activation of the GHQ Air Force, placing under it all air combat units within the continental United States. (Note: The Drum Board had done so to enable plugging Air Corps elements into its various "color" war plans, particularly Red-Orange (a coalition of Great Britain and Japan, viewed by the Army as a "worst-case scenario"). GHQ Air Force was a feasible if "risky" means of doing so without expanding the existing Air Corps. It also had the benefit of countering a bill to increase the size of Naval Aviation that had passed the House by proposing all future increases maintain an 18 to 10 ratio in numbers of aircraft favoring the Army.) This provided another, limited step toward an autonomous air force, but also kept authority divided by maintaining control of supply, doctrine, training and recruitment under the Chief of the Air Corps, and airfields in the control of corps area commanders.

Within the Air Corps, instrument training was upgraded, radio communications were greatly improved into a nationwide system that included navigation aids, and budget appropriations were increased. The Air Corps acquired the first six Link Trainer flight simulators of a fleet that would ultimately number more than 10,000. The operation also demonstrated the complete obsolescence of open-cockpit aircraft in military operations, leading to increased development of modern types in the second half of the decade, most of which served successfully in World War II.

Among the fallout of the scandal was the retirement under fire of Foulois as Chief of the Air Corps. He had been called to testify before the Rogers subcommittee on aviation of the House Committee of Military Affairs during the scandal. Chairman William N. Rogers of New Hampshire was suspicious of Foulois for negotiating aircraft contracts instead of assigning them to the lowest bidder, and during his testimony the Chief of Air Corps had been flamboyant and careless with hyperbole. In the wake of the mail fiasco, Rogers charged him with several violations of law and ethics, including making misleading statements to Congress and mismanagement during the air mail operation. Foulois demanded that Rogers release the evidence against him (largely damning testimony from senior Army staff officers given during secret hearings) and garnered the full support of the normally hostile Secretary of War, George Dern. The matter finally went before the Army's inspector general, whose findings in June 1935 exonerated Foulois of any criminal wrongdoing, but did cite him for making misleading statements regarding the mail operation. He received a reprimand from Dern, but throughout the summer of 1935 was publicly excoriated by Rogers. With his term as Chief expiring in December 1935, he chose to retire concurrently and took terminal leave from the Air Corps, beginning in September.

== See also ==
- Airmails of the United States
- United States government role in civil aviation

== Notes ==
Footnotes

Citations
