= Walter Folger Brown =

American politician (1869–1961)

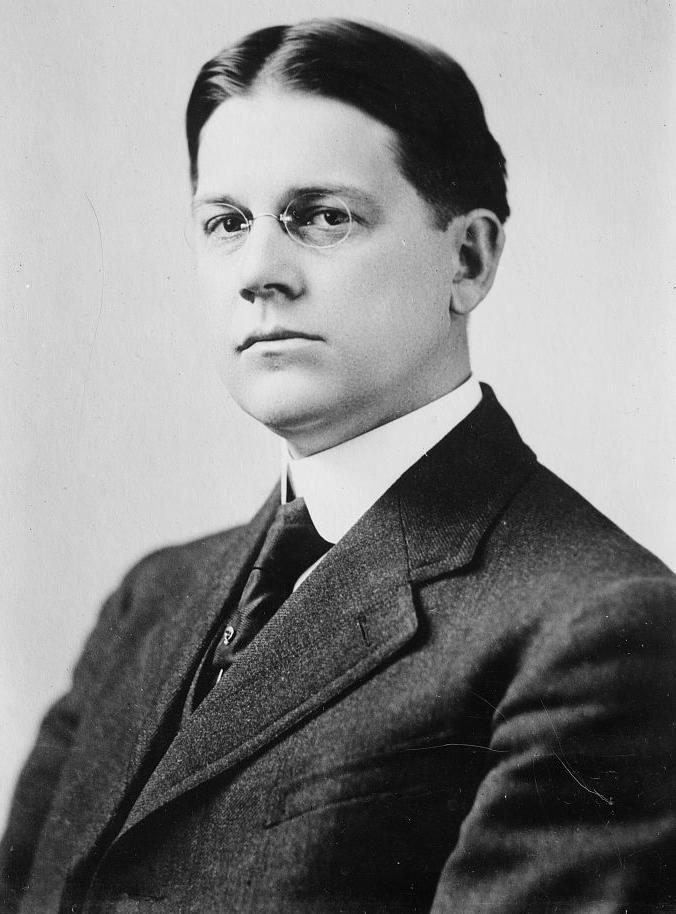
- Brown c. 1920–25

49th United States Postmaster General
- In office March 5, 1929 – March 4, 1933
- President: Herbert Hoover
- Preceded by: Harry Stewart New
- Succeeded by: James Farley

United States Assistant Secretary of Commerce
- In office November 2, 1927 – March 4, 1929
- Appointed by: Calvin Coolidge
- Preceded by: J. Walter Drake
- Succeeded by: Julius Klein

Personal details
- Born: May 31, 1869 Massillon, Ohio, U.S.
- Died: January 26, 1961 (aged 91) Toledo, Ohio, U.S.
- Resting place: Woodlawn Cemetery
- Party: Republican
- Spouse: Katharin Hafer (m. 1903; died 1960)
- Education: Harvard University (AB)

Walter Folger Brown (May 31, 1869 – January 26, 1961) was an American politician and lawyer who served as the Postmaster General of the United States from March 5, 1929, to March 4, 1933, under Herbert Hoover's administration.

== Biography ==
=== Early & personal life ===
Brown was born in Massillon, Ohio, to Lavinia (née Folger) and James Marshal Brown. He was educated in Toledo Public Schools and Western Reserve Academy. He married Katherin Hafer on September 10, 1903. Brown had no children.

=== Education ===
He graduated from Harvard University with a Bachelor of Arts degree in 1892 and later attended Harvard Law School from 1893 to 1894. While living in Ohio he studied law as an apprentice and eventually earned a law license.

=== Legal career ===
He practiced law with his father in Toledo from 1894 to 1905. From 1905 to 1927 he practiced law with the firm of Brown, Hahn & Sanger.

=== Political career ===
From 1911 to 1912 he was a member of the Ohio Constitutional Convention and later chairman of the Congressional Joint Committee on Reorganization of Executive Departments from 1921 to 1924. In 1927, President Calvin Coolidge appointed him to be the United States Assistant Secretary of Commerce. He held that position until he took the office of Postmaster General on March 5, 1929.

He served as President Hoover's Postmaster General from 1929 until 1933. He was best known from his involvement in the Air Mail scandal. He was also a delegate to the Republican National Convention in Ohio in 1940 and 1944, and served as the president of the Toledo Humane Society from 1911 until 1961.

Brown died at age 91 in Toledo on January 26, 1961. He was buried next to his wife Katherin Hafer in Woodlawn Cemetery.

== See also ==
- United States government role in civil aviation

Political offices
Preceded by Harry S. New	United States Postmaster General; Served under: Herbert Hoover; March 5, 1929 – March 4, 1933	Succeeded by James A. Farley
