= Aviation Section, U.S. Signal Corps =

Aerial warfare service (1914–1918) predecessor to the U.S. Air Force

Aviation Section, Signal Corps
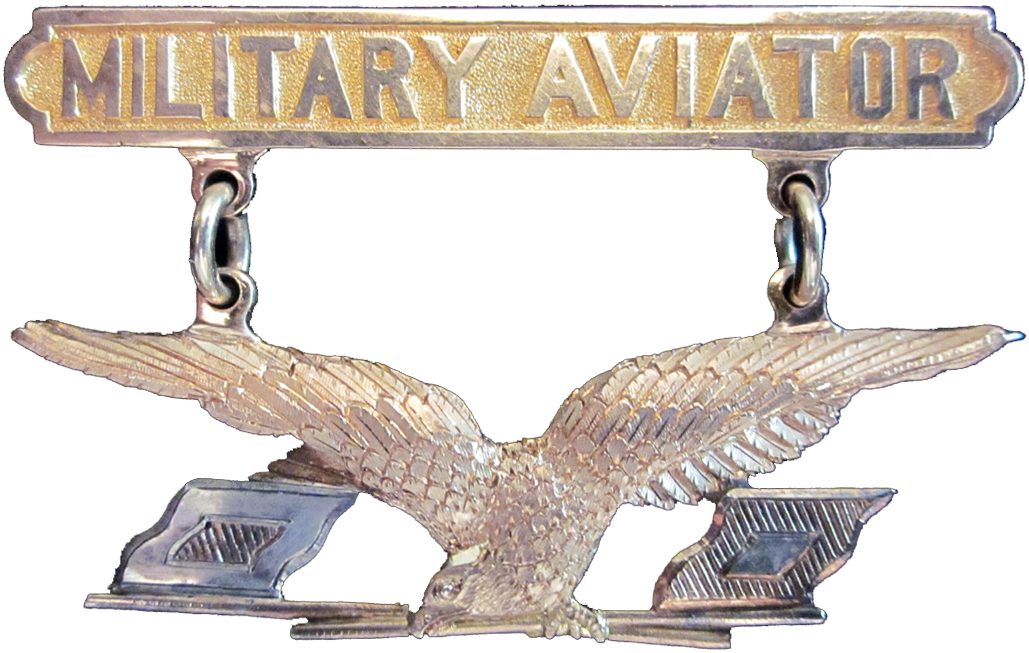
- Military aviator badge, 1913
- Active: 18 July 1914 – 20 May 1918
- Country: United States of America
- Branch: United States Army
- Type: Air force
- Role: Aerial warfare
- Size: 44 officers, 224 men, 23 aircraft (1914); 1,218 men, 280 aircraft (6 April 1917)
- Part of: Signal Corps
- Engagements: Punitive Expedition; World War I

The Aviation Section, Signal Corps, was the aerial warfare service of the United States from 1914 to 1918, and a direct statutory ancestor of the United States Air Force. It absorbed and replaced the Aeronautical Division, Signal Corps, and conducted the activities of Army aviation until its statutory responsibilities were suspended by President Woodrow Wilson in 1918. The Aviation Section organized the first squadrons of the aviation arm and conducted the first military operations by United States aviation on foreign soil.

The Aviation Section, Signal Corps, was created by the 63rd Congress (Public Law 143) on 18 July 1914 after earlier legislation to make the aviation service independent from the Signal Corps died in committee. From July 1914 until May 1918 the aviation section of the Signal Corps was familiarly known by the title of its administrative headquarters component at the time, seen variously as the Aeronautical Division, Air Division, Division of Military Aeronautics, and others. For historic convenience, however, the air arm is most commonly referred to by its official designation, the Aviation Section, Signal Corps (ASSC), and is the designation recognized by the United States Air Force as its predecessor for this period.

The Aviation Section began in turbulence, first as an alternative to making aviation in the Army a corps independent of the Signal Corps, then with friction between its pilots, who were all young and on temporary detail from other branches, and its leadership, who were more established Signal Corps officers and non-pilots. Despite the assignment of Lieutenant Colonel George O. Squier as chief, to bring stability to Army aviation, the Signal Corps found itself wholly inadequate to the task of supporting the Army in combat after the United States entered World War I on 6 April 1917. It attempted to expand and organize a competent arm but its efforts were largely chaotic and in the spring of 1918 aviation was removed, first from the jurisdiction of the Office of the Chief Signal Officer where it had resided since its inception, and then from the Signal Corps altogether. The duties of the section were not resumed following World War I and it was formally disestablished by the creation of the Air Service in 1920.

== Establishment ==
=== 1914 ===
Be it enacted..., that there shall hereafter be, and there is hereby created, an aviation section, which shall be a part of the Signal Corps of the Army, and which shall be, and is hereby, charged with the duty of operating or supervising the operation of all military aircraft, including balloons and aeroplanes, all appliances pertaining to said craft, and signaling apparatus of any kind when installed on said craft; also with the duty of training officers and enlisted men in matters pertaining to military aviation.

— Public Law 63-143, July 18, 1914 (Note: The text of the entire Act is found at Hennessy, Appendix 13, p. 233.)

The Aviation Section, Signal Corps, was created by the Act of 18 July 1914, Chapter 186 (Public Law 143, 63rd Congress), 38 Stat. 514, to supersede the Aeronautical Division, an administrative creation of the Signal Corps within the Office of the Chief Signal Officer (OCSO), as the primary agency for military aviation. Earlier legislation to make the aviation service independent from the Signal Corps died in committee after all officers connected with aviation save one, Captain Paul W. Beck, testified against it. Later provisions of the National Defense Act (39 Stat. 174), 3 June 1916, and the Aviation Act (40 Stat. 243), 24 July 1917, permitted aviation support functions to be gradually transferred from the Aeronautical Division to newly established aviation section organizations. The new law established the purpose and duties of the section, authorized a significant increase in size of U.S. military aviation to 60 officers and 260 enlisted men, increased the size of the Signal Corps by an equal number of personnel to provide them, stipulated that pilots be volunteers from branches of the line of the Army, and detailed them for four years. The Aeronautical Division then became the administrative component of the Aviation Section until its abolition in 1918. The first funding appropriation for the Aviation Section was $250,000 for fiscal year 1915. (Note: Approximately $5.9 million in 2014 dollars. US Inflation Calculator)

The new law also decreed restrictions that only unmarried lieutenants of the line under the age of 30 could be detailed to the section, provisions which encouraged a lack of discipline and professional maturity among the aviators that handicapped the growth of the service, hampered retention of pilots, and prevented flying officers from commanding flying units. Officers on aviation duty who were promoted to permanent captain in their branch arm were automatically returned to the line. Aggravating the situation, the 11 remaining pilots of the 24 previously rated as military aviators all had their ratings automatically reduced to junior military aviator (and therefore incurred a 25% reduction in flight pay) when requirements were changed to include three years experience as a JMA before qualifying for the higher rating. This placed them on the same level as newly graduated pilots, and none of those so reduced regained their ratings before 1917. (Note: The Aviation Act of 24 July 1917 authorized those holding a pre-war JMA rating to advance to an MA rating either by the three-year rule or by "distinguished service".)

At its creation, the Aviation Section had 19 officers and 101 enlisted men. The Aeronautical Division, a quasi-headquarters (Lieutenant Colonel Samuel Reber, Washington, D.C.) with three officers and 11 enlisted men, issued orders in the name of the chief signal officer (CSO). All other personnel of the aviation section were organized on 5 August 1914, by Signal Corps Aviation School General Order No. 10 into the:

- Signal Corps Aviation School (Captain Arthur S. Cowan, San Diego), (Note: Four officers, 37 enlisted men, and seven civilians, plus airplane S.C. No. 22)
- 1st Aero Squadron (Captain Benjamin D. Foulois), (Note: A headquarters of two officers and one enlisted man)
- 1st Company, 1st Aero Squadron (Captain Harold C. Geiger) (Note: Five officers, 26 enlisted men, and three airplanes: S.C. Nos. 24, 25, and 26.)
- 2nd Company, 1st Aero Squadron (Captain Lewis E. Goodier, Jr.), (Note: Five officers, 26 enlisted men, and S.C. Nos. 20, 28, and 30)

totaling 16 officers, 90 enlisted men, seven civilians, and seven aircraft. (Note: The organization of the aero squadron into two companies lasted only until April 1915, when it changed to 12 sections, including a section for each of its eight aircraft. The companies of the 1st Aero Squadron, carried on separate rolls, were consolidated into a single entity on 17 April.)

Most of the air service had just returned to San Diego from detached service in Texas for the second time in as many years to support Army ground forces in a possible war with Mexico over the Tampico Affair. The impending war was defused by the resignation of Victoriano Huerta on 15 July. (Note: Company A of the 1st Aero Squadron, led by Capt. Foulois, left San Diego 24 April with five pilots, a medical officer, thirty enlisted men and three airplanes by train for Galveston, arriving 30 April, one day after the last transport sailed for Veracruz. As a result they did no flying for four months, since their planes were never uncrated. (Pool, p. 438; and Hennessy, p. 120))

By December 1914, the Aviation Section consisted of 44 officers, 224 enlisted men, and 23 aircraft.

=== 1915–1916 ===
Chief Signal Officer Brigadier General George P. Scriven announced on 9 April 1915 that following the establishment of an aero company at San Antonio, three additional companies would be sent overseas, to the Philippine Department for station on Corregidor, to Fort Kamehameha in the Hawaiian Department, and to the Panama Canal Zone. The 1st Company, 2nd Aero Squadron was activated on 12 May 1915 at San Diego but not manned until December.

A small detachment with S.C. 31, a Martin T tractor airplane, returned from San Diego to Texas for the fourth time in five years, in April 1915, led by 1st Lieutenant Thomas D. Milling and 2nd Lieutenant Byron Q. Jones, (Note: On 15 January Jones had set a solo flight duration record with a flight time of eight hours and 53 minutes flying S.C. 31. (Hennessy, p. 135)) as the Army massed around Brownsville in response to civil war between the forces of Pancho Villa and the Carranza government. On 20 April, Milling and Jones became the first American military airmen to come under fire from a hostile force. (Note: Using part of the cavalry drill field at Fort Brown as a landing strip, Milling and Jones flew S.C. 31 to observe for movements of Pancho Villa, with Jones as pilot and Milling as observer. A morning flight was routine but on the afternoon sortie, while still on the American side of the border, their aircraft was fired upon by a machine gun. After landing at Fort Brown, Jones taxied the plane into a ditch and damaged it beyond repair; the chief of the Aviation Section refused to replace it for ten days until pressured to do so. (Hennessy, p. 145))

Beginning in August 1915, the 1st Aero Squadron spent four months at Fort Sill, Oklahoma, training at the Field Artillery School with eight newly delivered Curtiss JN-2s. After a fatal crash on 12 August, the pilots of the squadron met with squadron commander Foulois and declared the JN-2 unsafe because of low power, shoddy construction, lack of stability, and overly sensitive rudders. Foulois and Milling, now also a captain, disagreed and the JN-2 remained operational until a second crashed on 5 September. The aircraft were grounded until 14 October, when conversions of the JN-2s to the newer JN-3 began, two copies of which the squadron received in early September.

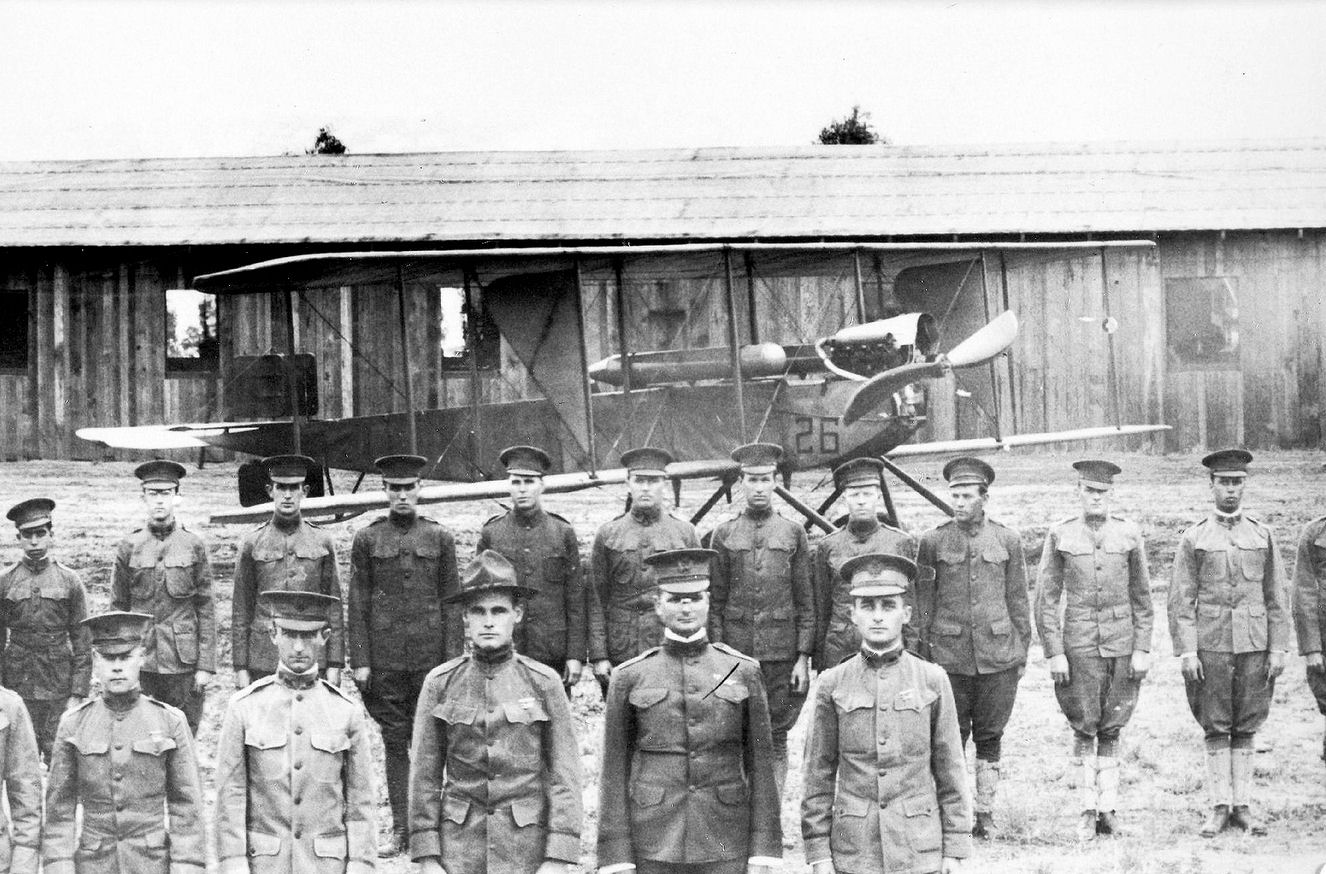
Members of the 1st Aero Squadron and a Burgess Model H trainer at North Island (later Rockwell Field), San Diego, California, 1915

Between 19 and 26 November 1915, the six JN-3s of the 1st Aero Squadron at Fort Sill (the other two were on detached duty at Brownsville) made the first cross-country squadron flight, 439 mi (707 km) to a new airfield built near Fort Sam Houston, Texas.

The Texas base became the "first permanent aeronautical station" (Note: The site had been approved in April 1913 but was delayed by lack of funding.) on 6 January 1916, designated as the San Antonio Air Center. The first "permanent" base was abandoned after several months and its remaining funding allocated to the establishment of a new training school on Long Island, New York. Signal Corps Aviation Station, Mineola (later Hazelhurst Field) opened on 22 July 1916.

On 12 January 1916, the strength of the Aviation Section stood at 60 officers (23 JMA-rated pilots, 27 student pilots) and 243 enlisted men (eight of whom were pilots), which figures were 100% and 93% respectively of its authorized totals. It was now organized into four subordinate organizations:

- the Aeronautical Division (Washington D.C.)
- the Signal Corps Aviation School (San Diego)
- the 1st Aero Squadron (San Antonio Air Center)
- the 1st Company, 2nd Aero Squadron (Manila)

It had 23 aircraft: four seaplanes based overseas at Manila, two seaplanes (Note: These Curtiss flying boats were heavier than their land-based counterparts and used as primary trainers in San Diego's gusty winds. They also provided many more takeoff and landing repetitions for new student pilots in the same training time frame. (Hennessy, p. 113)) and nine trainers at San Diego, and eight JN-3s in Texas. Thirty-two other aircraft had been destroyed or written off since 1909, one was in the Smithsonian Institution, and three were too damaged to repair practically.

On 1 November 1915, the first aviation organization in the National Guard was created, the "Aviation Detachment, 1st Battalion Signal Corps, New York National Guard", later called simply the "1st Aero Company". Consisting of four officers (including its founder, Captain Raynal Bolling) and 40 enlisted men, it used two leased aircraft to train until five aircraft were purchased for its equipment in 1916.

== Punitive expedition ==
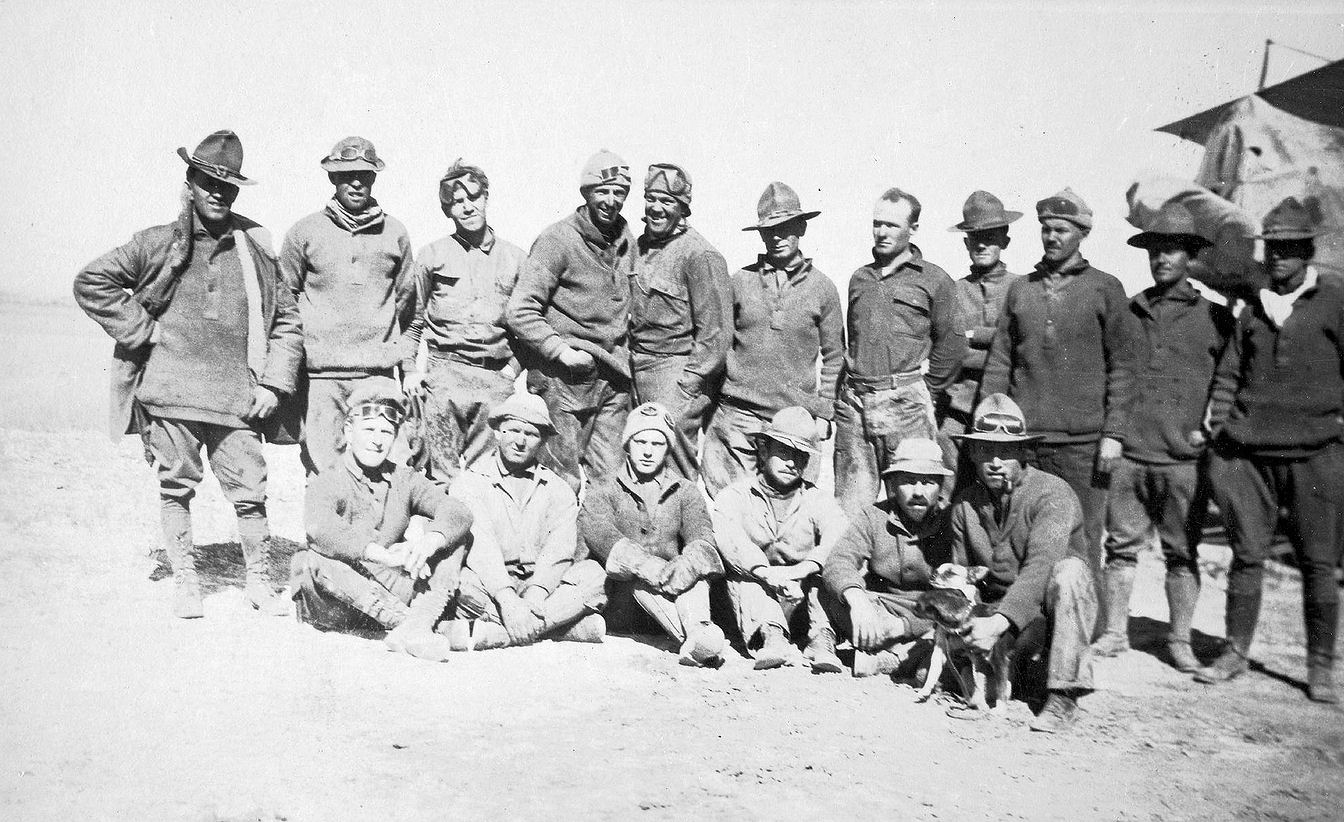
Members of the 1st Aero Squadron in Mexico, 1916

Following Villa's raid on Columbus, New Mexico, on 9 March 1916, the 1st Aero Squadron was attached to Major General John J. Pershing's punitive expedition. It consisted of 11 pilots, 84 enlisted men (including two medics), a civilian mechanic, and was supported by an engineer officer and 14 men. Eight Curtiss JN-3s (Note: Former JN-2s S.C. Nos. 41–45 and 48; and original JN-3s Nos. 52–53) were disassembled at Fort Sam Houston on 12 March and shipped the next day by rail to Columbus, along with half of the squadron's motorized transportation: ten Jeffrey trucks, one automobile, and six motorcycles. Two other trucks were received in Columbus and all of the trucks assigned to the expedition's quartermaster. The JN-3s were reassembled as they were off-loaded on 15 March, the date the first column marched into Mexico. The first observation mission flown by the squadron, and the first American military reconnaissance flight over foreign territory, was flown the next day and lasted 51 minutes with Dodd at the controls and Foulois observing.

On 19 March, Pershing telegraphed Foulois and ordered the squadron forward to his advanced base at Colonia Dublán, 230 miles from Columbus, to observe for the 7th and 10th cavalry regiments. Half of the ground echelon moved forward by truck, while the remaining half and the entire squadron engineering section remained in Columbus to assist the quartermaster in the assembly of new trucks. Because of coordination difficulties, the eight JN-3s were unable to take off until 17:10. One aircraft (Note: No. 42, flown by 1st Lt. Walter G. Kilner.) developed engine problems immediately and turned back. Four, led by Captain Townsend F. Dodd and Foulois in No. 44, flew more or less in formation at a lower altitude for better navigation. Three flew at a higher altitude and soon lost sight of the others.

None of the eight aircraft made Dublán that evening, all were forced down by darkness: in addition to the aircraft that turned back, one crash-landed and was destroyed by scavengers after a forced landing near Pearson, Mexico (south of its intended landing ground), and six others landed intact. Four that landed together at Ascensión (about halfway to Dublán) flew on to the advanced base in the morning, where they arrived an hour after the plane that had been forced to return to Columbus with engine trouble, and after another that had waited out the night on a road at Janos. (Note: In order of arrival, these were No. 42 (Kilner), No. 43 (Lt. Herbert A. Dargue), No. 44 (Dodd and Foulois), No. 45 (Lt. Joseph E. Carberry), No. 48 (Lt. Thomas S. Bowen), and No. 53 (Lt. Carleton G. Chapman). Bowen crashed his aircraft while landing in a cross-wind, damaging it beyond economical repair. No. 52 (Lt. Edgar S. Gorrell) made an attempt to continue on 22 March but was damaged at an interim refueling stop. It finally reached Dublán on 26 March.)

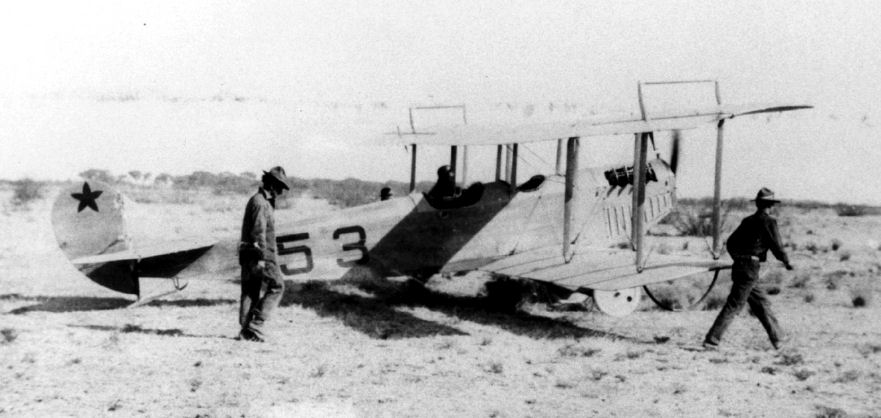
Lt. Carleton G. Chapman in 1st Aero Squadron Curtiss JN-3 Signal Corps No. 53 preparing to takeoff at Casas Grande, Mexico

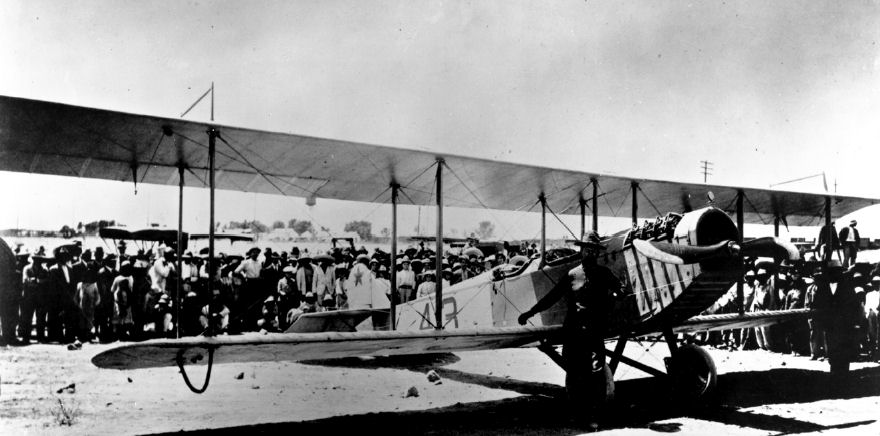
Lt. Herbert A. "Bert" Dargue posing in front of Signal Corps No. 43 at Chihuahua City, Mexico (Note: Dargue and the airplane had just been stoned by a hostile crowd when the picture was taken. A cool Dargue had the photographer pose him as long as possible to avoid further violence and the mob did not attack while the camera was in use.)

The squadron returned to Columbus on 22 April for new aircraft, where it expanded to a roster of 16 pilots and 122 enlisted men. It flew liaison missions for Pershing's force using detachments in Mexico until 15 August 1916. The 1st Aero Squadron flew a total of 540 liaison and aerial reconnaissance missions, traveling 19,553 mi (31,468 km) with a flight time of 345 hours 43 minutes. No observations were made of hostile troops but the squadron performed invaluable services maintaining communications between Pershing's headquarters and ground units deep inside Mexico. During this expedition, a solid red star on the rudder became the first national insignia for United States military aircraft.

Their airplanes did not have sufficient power to fly over the Sierra Madre Mountains nor did they perform well in the turbulence of its passes, and missions averaged only 36 mi (58 km) distance from their landing fields. The planes were nearly impossible to maintain because of a lack of parts and environmental conditions (laminated wooden propellers had to be dismounted after each flight and placed in humidors to keep their glue from disintegrating), and after just 30 days service only two were left. Both were no longer flight worthy and were condemned on 22 April. Congress in a deficiency bill voted the Aviation Section an emergency appropriation of $500,000 (twice its previous budget), and although four new Curtiss N-8s (Note: Numbers 60–63, later designated JN-4s) were shipped to Columbus, they were rejected by Foulois after six days of flight testing. Foulois recommended condemnation of the N-8s but they were instead shipped to San Diego, modified, and ultimately used as training aircraft.

A new agency was also created within the Aviation Section, the Technical Advisory and Inspection Board, headed by Milling, and staffed by pilots who had completed aeronautical engineering courses at the Massachusetts Institute of Technology and civilian engineers, including Donald Douglas. The board recommended the squadron be equipped with new Curtiss R-2s, which used 160 hp (120 kW) engines.

The first two were delivered on 1 May 1916, and the remaining 10 by 25 May. They were assigned Signal Corps numbers 64 to 75. The R-2s were equipped with Lewis machine guns, wireless sets, and standard compasses, but their performance proved little better than that of their predecessors. Pilots were quoted by name in both The New York Times and New York Herald Tribune as condemning their equipment, but Pershing did not pursue the issue, noting they had "already too often risked their lives in old and often useless machines they have patched up and worked over in an effort to do their share of the duty this expedition has been called upon to perform".

== Goodier court-martial ==
=== Charges and countercharges ===
In August 1914, soon after the passage of the act creating the Aviation Section, World War I began. The European powers showed an immediate interest in promoting military aviation but the Army's general staff remained apathetic regarding development of aerial capabilities, as Captain Beck had charged the year before. The chief signal officer continued restrictions on development and acquisition of aircraft that were perceived by the young aviators as detrimental to flying safety and likely to prevent the Aviation Section from providing aviation support to the Army comparable to that of the European powers in the event that the United States was drawn into the war. Officers who had testified against separation of aviation from the Signal Corps in August 1913 now were for it, marking the beginning of the movement that ultimately culminated in the creation of the United States Air Force 33 years later. Considerable friction developed between the young pilots from the line of the Army and their non-flying superiors in the Signal Corps, primarily over safety concerns the pilots felt were being disregarded in the interest of efficiency. (see Appropriations, growth, and "incipient mutiny" under Aeronautical Division, U.S. Signal Corps.)

The commanding officer of the 1st Aero Squadron's 2nd Company at San Diego, Captain Lewis Edward Goodier, Jr., was seriously injured in a demonstration accident on 5 November 1914. Flying with Glenn L. Martin in a new aircraft undergoing a required competitive slow speed test, the aircraft stalled, and when Martin overcorrected with too much throttle, went into what was described as the first tailspin. Goodier suffered a nearly severed nose, two broken legs, a re-opened skull fracture, and a severe puncture of his knee from the drive shaft. The accident occurred amidst a series of fatal training crashes, all involving the Wright C pusher airplane, that resulted in six deaths between July 1913 and February 1914, and culminated in pilots refusing to fly pusher airplanes. After a cursory review of the crashes, school commandant Captain Arthur S. Cowan (Note: Cowan was an 1899 graduate of the United States Military Academy and had risen rapidly in rank (1st lieutenant in two years and captain in eight) through transfers and assignments to the service schools. He moved from the Infantry to the Signal Corps in March 1909 (with date of rank back-dated to 1907), then in 1910 headed the Aeronautical Division at the age of 35. He personally recruited Henry H. Arnold for pilot duties. He was Signal Officer of the 2nd Division in Texas City, Texas, when Capt. Charles deForest Chandler was relieved and transferred to the Philippines over differences with his pilots. Temporarily assigned to command the provisional 1st Aero Squadron, he was made commandant of the Signal Corps Aviation School when the squadron returned to the school in June 1913.) refused to discontinue use of the aircraft, dismissing the pilots as "nothing but amateurs". (Note: Cowan's statement was made to and included in the inspector general's report investigating the crashes as justification of his decision.)

While recuperating, Goodier assisted Captain Townsend F. Dodd and 1st Lieutenant Walter Taliaferro in an attempt to prefer charges against Cowan for fraudulently collecting flight pay when he was neither certified to fly nor on flying duty. (Note: Cowan's total flight experience was 24 minutes of "grass-cutting"—tethered flying in short, straight hops just above the ground.) They were aided by Goodier's father, Lieutenant Colonel Lewis Edward Goodier, Sr., Judge Advocate General of the Western Department in San Francisco, who also preferred charges against former squadron commander Captain William Lay Patterson for similar offenses, (Note: Before becoming squadron commander, the Canadian-born Patterson had been the aide-de-camp of Brigadier General Charles B. Hall, Commandant of the Signal School. His career began in 1901 as a lieutenant in the "Porto Rican Provisional Regiment of Infantry". Commissioned in the Regular Army in 1905, Patterson was an infantry officer who remained in the Aviation Section through World War I as a balloonist. In 1920 he received a majority in the infantry and briefly transferred in grade to the Air Service, but was soon returned to the infantry and posted to the Bureau of Insular Affairs.) charging that he had been awarded a rating of junior military aviator, and was drawing pay based on it, without being qualified to fly or being on flying duty.

The charges were routed to the chief signal officer at a time when Cowan's superior, Chief of the Aviation Section Lieutenant Colonel Samuel Reber, (Note: Reber was an 1886 graduate of the United States Military Academy. He was an early member of the Aero Club of America as a balloonist. Unlike his predecessor Cowan, Reber was older (48) at the time of his appointment in 1913 as chief of aviation. Among his classmates were the two future chiefs of air service Charles T. Menoher and Mason M. Patrick. He was the son-in-law of Lt. Gen. Nelson A. Miles, retired Commanding General of the United States Army.) himself an integral part of the accusations and also a non-flyer, was temporarily in command. Reber had the charges against Cowan and Patterson dismissed, then he and Cowan charged the elder Goodier with "conduct to the prejudice of good order and discipline" for assisting in drawing up of charges against Cowan, specifying that he did so out of malice.

=== Goodier court-martialed ===
The resulting court martial proceedings, which began 18 October 1915, resulted in the conviction of Lieutenant Colonel Goodier and a sentence of reprimand. Brigadier General E. H. Crowder, the Army's judge advocate general, ruled (after the preferring of charges against Lieutenant Colonel Goodier but before his trial) that neither Cowan nor Patterson was criminally culpable of fraud because of legal technicalities. (Note: Cowan and Patterson were paid a 35% increase over their base pay by a provision of the aviation appropriations act of 2 March 1913 that allowed up to 30 officers assigned to the Aeronautical Division to do so (the division had nowhere near 30 pilots). Although neither Cowan or Patterson completed training, nor could fly solo, the 1913 act did not require a rating or actual flying to draw the pay, even though its intent was to compensate for risk, requiring only that officers be held in "readiness" for flying duties. Both retained their flight pay after passage of Public Law 143 (18 July 1914) creating the Aviation Section, because the new law did not specifically repeal the 1913 appropriations act. A ruling was made on behalf of Cowan by the JAG that he was excepted from the 1914 requirements and entitled to the pay under the 1913 act. Patterson received a JMA rating in September 1914 (in effect, from Cowan), after Public Law 143 established it as a legal requirement to draw flight pay, because no flying ability test was yet required by the War Department to acquire the rating. Reber was aware of all these facts.) Although legally correct, the ruling put the Army in a bad public light for not only condoning misfeasance but failing to correct it. (Note: Patterson was actually made commander of the first company of the new 2nd Aero Squadron, and eventually learned to fly solo. Cowan also learned to fly but never earned a junior military aviator rating.) Evidence also showed that at the same time Reber and Cowan had used Captain Goodier's injuries as a pretext to have him dismissed from the Aviation Section while he was recuperating.

However the charge of malice allowed defense counsel wide latitude in its introduction of evidence, and documents including official correspondence describing numerous incidents that confirmed Captain Goodier's original charges against Cowan became part of the court record, including support by the CSO of a pattern of retribution against officers on flying duty who fell in disfavor of Cowan. Senator Joseph T. Robinson immediately brought the matter before the United States Senate, introducing S.J. Resolution 65 in January 1916, calling for an investigation of malfeasance in the Aviation Section involving serious mismanagement, disregard for flying safety, favoritism, fraud, and concealment of wrongdoing in the Aviation Section's chain of command. Robinson conducted hearings and released to the public all of the documents held in evidence at the court martial. S.J. Resolution 65 passed on 16 March 1916, without opposition. An acting head of section was immediately appointed pending the outcome of the investigation.

The second of these acting heads of division was Major William "Billy" Mitchell, a general staff officer who had testified before Congress in 1913 against transfer of aviation from the Signal Corps. As a result of negative publicity regarding its airplanes in Mexico, Mitchell and the Aviation Section came under severe criticism during this period. Mitchell defended the department, insisting that the U.S. firms did not produce better aircraft, but the outcry produced several long-term results, including instructing Mitchell in political tactics, participation in which ultimately resulted in his court-martial at the end of his career.

=== Report of the Garlington Board ===
While the Senate hearings were in progress and the 1st Aero Squadron encountered difficulties with its airplanes in Mexico, Scriven issued a statement accusing the young aviators of "unmilitary insubordination and disloyal acts" in an attempt to form an air service separate from the Signal Corps. He also recommended that the age and marital status restrictions for pilots be removed to encourage older and therefore more experienced officers to volunteer for aviation duty. Brig. Gen. Ernest Albert Garlington, the Inspector general, was appointed by Army Chief of Staff Gen. Hugh L. Scott to head a board of investigation into the Aviation Section. The Garlington Board confirmed Goodier's allegations and also cited Scriven and Reber for failing to supervise the section adequately, holding them responsible for acquiring substandard aircraft. The Garlington Board's report, together with the Senate resolution and public criticism of the equipment used in Mexico, prompted Secretary of War Newton Baker to issue letters of reprimand to Scriven, Reber and Cowan. Reber was formally relieved as Chief of the Aviation Section on 5 May, (Note: Reber's "punishment" was short-lived, and he was promoted to full colonel less than two months after his relief. He went to France with the American Expeditionary Force in March 1918 as a provost marshal, and saw action on the last day of the war with the 109th Infantry Regiment. He retired at his own request in 1919 and joined the newly created Radio Corporation of America.) and Cowan of his duties in July. (Note: The official history of the United States Air Force, published in 1997, is much more sympathetic to Cowan, stating "Cowan's subordinates were maneuvering to depose him, allegedly because he played favorites and ignored safety. Actually the root of his departure from the air arm was the mutual misunderstanding between pilots, understandably concerned with safety, and a non-flying manager determined to get the most efficient use from the obsolescent machines entrusted to him." (Heimdahl and Hurley, p. 30). However, the official history completely omits any mention of the court martial; the evidence of Cowan's retribution against officers he disliked, including the attempt to cashier Capt. Goodier after his crash; and Secretary Baker's official censure of Reber and Cowan as reasons for the "departure". The army in effect ignored this episode and it did not affect his career. Cowan afterwards served in a number of Signal Corps training billets, and was promoted to major in May 1917. He received a wartime promotion to colonel and served as a staff officer in the headquarters of the AEF in France. He was 14th on the 1922 promotion list to colonel (out of 669 names) and after promotion to colonel was post commander of Fort Monmouth, New Jersey, the last 10 years of his career. Cowan reached mandatory retirement age in April 1939 after 40 years of service. He was recalled to active duty from the retired list on 22 November 1940, serving as signal officer of the Ninth Corps Area Service Command, and was again placed on the retired list 30 September 1942, at the age of 67. Cowan's retirement was changed to "disability incident to service" on 27 November 1943.) Both were assigned non-aviation duties in the Signal Corps after extensive leaves of absence. Lt. Col. George O. Squier was recalled from duty as military attaché in London and appointed Chief of the Aviation Section on 20 May, with orders to reform it literally from the ground up.

On 24 April 1916, the General Staff appointed a committee chaired by Col. Charles W. Kennedy to make recommendations for reform and reorganization of the Aviation Section. Milling was named the representative from the section, over the objections of Foulois, who believed him to be too close to the previous Signal Corps leadership. The committee took statements from all 23 officers then on flying duty with the Aviation Section and found that 21 favored separation of aviation from the Signal Corps. Only Milling and Captain Patterson were opposed to separation—and Patterson was the non-flyer who had acquired his flying certificate through the censured actions of Cowan.

The Kennedy Committee recommended in July 1916 that aviation be expanded and developed, and that it be removed from the Signal Corps and placed under a central agency, in effect endorsing for the first time a call for a separate air arm. The recommendation was quickly attacked by Assistant Army Chief of Staff Gen. Tasker Bliss, who branded the air officers supporting separation as having "a spirit of insubordination" and acting out of "self-aggrandizement". (Note: For the next 23 years, accusations of insubordination and seeking promotion became the preferred tactic that senior ground forces officers used against pilots supporting the movement to achieve greater autonomy.) The Kennedy Committee's findings were rejected by the agency that created it, but the issue of a separate Air Force had been born and would not die until separation was finally achieved in 1947.

== Response to World War I ==
=== Aviation Section legislation and appropriations ===
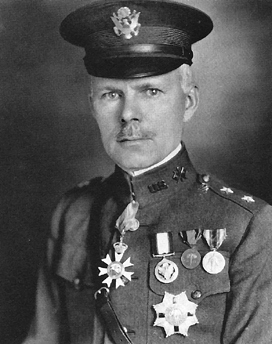
Maj. Gen. George O. Squier, Chief of the Aviation Section, USSC 1916–1917; Chief Signal Officer 1917–1918

On 3 June 1916, in anticipation of possible U.S. entry in the war in Europe, Congress adopted the National Defense Act of 3 June 1916 (39 Stat. 166, 174, 175), provisions of which authorized an increase in the size of the Aviation Section to 148 officers, (Note: Specifically, the act authorized the section to consist of a colonel, a lieutenant colonel, eight majors, 24 captains, and 114 first lieutenants. The colonelcy was never filled. (Mooney and Layman, p. 113)) allowed the President to determine the size of the enlisted complement, and established the first reserve components for aviation, the Signal Officers Reserve Corps (297 officers) and the Signal Enlisted Reserve Corps (2,000 men). However, anticipating the presidential election of 1916, the normally aviation-friendly Wilson Administration still refused to put forth a budget appropriation request greater than that of the preceding year. Following Scriven's recommendations, the law rescinded the eligibility restrictions for detailing officers to be pilots in the 1914 act and allowed rated captains to also draw the temporary rank, pay and allowances of the next higher grade.

On 29 August, however, Congress followed with an appropriations bill that allocated $13,000,000 (Note: Approximately $285 million in 2015 dollars. US Inflation Calculator) (more than 17 times the previous combined allocation) to the military aeronautics in both the Signal Corps and National Guard. By 7 December, the force still consisted of a total of only 503 personnel. Squier also created a Field Officers course for aviation at North Island similar to that for the Service Schools in Fort Leavenworth to train field grade officers in the staff administration of aviation. Of the four officers assigned to the course in November 1916, two actually headed the section or its successor. (Note: Lt. Col. John B. Bennet, who succeeded Squier, and Col. William L. Kenly, who headed the Division of Military Aeronautics.)

The poor showing in Mexico of the Aviation Section's JN3s also showed that the U.S. aviation industry was not competitive in any respect with European aircraft manufacturers. No American-manufactured airplane had a vital function, none were mounted with weapons, and all were markedly inferior in speed and other performance characteristics. Further, U.S. companies were distracted by protracted legal battles and in-fighting over licenses and royalties while their European counterparts had been energized by the needs of the battlefield.

The United States entered World War I in April 1917. In addition to appropriating $640,000,000 for expansion of the military air arm, (Note: The largest single-purpose appropriation ever made by Congress to that time, exceeding that of building the Panama Canal) the Aviation Act (40 Stat. 243), passed 24 July 1917, transferred aviation support functions from the Aeronautical Division to the following newly established organizations in the Office of the Chief Signal Officer:

- Engineering Division, 6 April 1917: Procurement and distribution of aviation supplies; later designated Finance and Supply Division; and Engineering Division again on 2 August 1917.
- Construction Division, 21 May 1917: Air field construction and maintenance; redesignated Supply Division, 1 October 1917, with added responsibility for procurement and distribution of aviation supplies transferred from Engineering Division and vested in subordinate Materiel Section, organized 24 January 1918.
- Aircraft Engineering Division, 24 May 1917: Research and design; redesignated Science and Research Division, 22 October 1917.
- Wood Section, August 1917: Airplane lumber contracts; expanded and redesignated Spruce Production Division, 15 November 1917. (Note: Appointed to command the Wood Section was Lt. Col. Brice P. Disque on 15 September 1917. Disque was a former 3rd Cavalry officer who had been on special assignment as a civilian investigating labor unrest in the Pacific Northwest.)

The Aeronautical Division was renamed the Air Division (also called the Air Service Division), with functions limited to operation, training, and personnel on 1 October 1917. The Air Division was abolished by order of Secretary of War on 24 April 1918, and OCSO aviation functions realigned to create the Division of Military Aeronautics, with responsibility for general oversight of military aviation; and the Bureau of Aircraft Production, which had charge of design and production of aircraft and equipment.

=== Failures of expansion ===
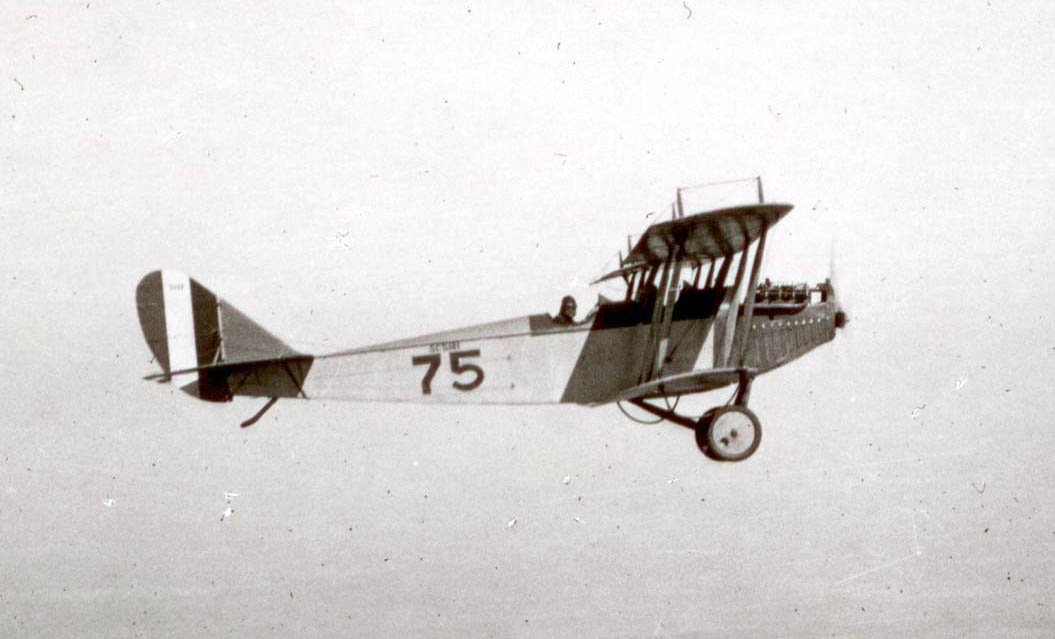
Curtiss JN-4 trainer

In its final year as a component of the Signal Corps, from the declaration of war on Germany by the United States in April 1917 to May 1918, the Aviation Section developed into parallel air forces, a training force in the United States and a combat force in Europe. After February 1917, the section consisted of three divisions in the OCSO: Administrative, Engineering, and Aeronautical. At the onset of war the Aviation Section consisted of only 65 regular officers, 66 reserve officers, 1,087 enlisted men, and 280 airplanes (all trainers), with more on order. The service had 36 pilots and 51 student pilots. By comparison, the United States Navy's air service had 48 officers, 230 enlisted men, and 54 powered aircraft.

In the United States, the Aviation Section was nearly overwhelmed with the problems of rapid expansion to fight a modern war—the recruitment and training of pilots and mechanics, the production of airplanes, the formation and equipping of combat units, and the acquisition of air bases—while overseas a second force developed as part of the American Expeditionary Force, absorbing most of the experienced leadership of military aviation and taking over much of the expansion responsibilities except aircraft production. This second force, the Air Service of the AEF, used European-built aircraft and training facilities and forced the separation of aviation from the Signal Corps.

Part of this separation occurred when the Aviation Section failed in its most pressing need, the production of new airplanes. Under pressure from the French, the Wilson administration set up a production plan to develop a force of 6,000 pursuit planes; 3,000 observation craft; and 2,000 bombers, a ratio established by Pershing, now commanding general of the AEF. Despite pronounced resistance from the Army general staff, $640,000,000 (Note: Approximately $14 billion in 2015 dollars. US Inflation Calculator) was funded by Congress to meet this goal (45 times the budget of the preceding year) when Squier, now a brigadier general and advanced to CSO, appealed directly to the Secretary of War.

An Aircraft Production Board was set up under the chairmanship of an automobile manufacturer, Howard E. Coffin of the Hudson Motor Car Company, but the airplane of World War I was not suitable to the mass-production methods of automobile manufacturing and Coffin neglected the priority of mass-producing spare parts. Though individual areas within the industry responded well—particularly in engine production, with the development of the Liberty engine, of which 13,500 were produced—the industry as a whole failed. Attempts to mass-produce European models under license in the U.S. were largely failures. Among pursuit planes, the SPAD S.VII could not be engineered to accept an American engine and the Bristol F.2 became dangerous to fly using one.

Because of this failure, President Wilson determined that the OCSO was too overburdened by tasks to supervise effectively the Aviation Section and created a new subordinate organization, the Division of Military Aeronautics, on 24 April 1918, to assume all the functions and responsibilities for aviation. The DMA was removed from the Signal Corps altogether by executive order, under war powers granted to the president under the newly passed Overman Act, on 20 May 1918, reporting directly to the Secretary of War and effectively suspending the statutory duties of the Aviation Section. Four days later, on 24 May, both the DMA and the civilian-headed Bureau of Aircraft Production came under the aegis of a new organization, the Air Service, United States Army. The Aviation Section had been created by an act of Congress and was not formally disestablished until the passage of the National Defense Act of 1920, statutorily creating the Air Service.

=== Aero squadrons ===
In January 1917 the CSO advised the House Committee on Military Affairs that during 1917 the Aviation Section would increase in size to 13 aero squadrons: four land plane squadrons based in the United States, three seaplane squadrons to be based in U.S. possessions overseas, and six reserve squadrons for coast defense. By the time of the United States entry into World War I in April, three squadrons (1st and 3rd in the U.S., 2nd in the Philippines) were in service, two (6th for Hawaii and 7th for the Panama Canal Zone) were organizing, and two (4th and 5th, to be based in the continental U.S.) had yet to receive personnel. In March, for planning purposes, the Army Chief of Staff proposed new tables of organization and authorized a total of 20 squadrons, including an additional squadron in the U.S. and six additional for coast defense. However the plan was never implemented because of the war and only 131 of the required 440 officers had been assigned.

During the following year, until the statutory responsibilities of the Aviation Section were suspended for the duration of the war plus six months by Wilson's executive order, the Aviation Section rapidly mobilized "aero squadrons" for a multiplicity of needs, including combat operations. This resulted in a conglomeration of several classifications by function, as flying squadrons were only a portion of the units required by the Aviation Section and by its successor, the Air Service:

- Service squadron: Flying units equipped with planes and flying personnel. Enlisted personnel assigned to the squadron consisted of mechanics, radio operators, machine gun armorers and chauffeurs. Service squadrons were eventually classified as "pursuit", "observation" or "bombardment" according to their combat role.
- School squadron: Support units consisting primarily of aircraft mechanics, performing their work in the hangars and shops at training bases for pilots and observers.
- Construction squadron: Units which built new airfields, smoothing and grading a field for aircraft landings and takeoffs. They also erected hangars, barracks, shops, and all the other infrastructure (roads, electricity, water, sewer) needed to establish a new airfield. In the Zone of the Advance in France, new airfields were established quickly as the front line changed.
- Park squadron (also known as "air park"): Logistical units whose mission was to supply the equipment and supplies necessary for the other squadrons to operate.

In the Air Service of the AEF, one squadron historian estimated that for each flying ("service") squadron, there were at least five support squadrons to maintain its aircraft, airfields and stations, beginning with the park squadrons. Behind them were:

- Depot squadrons to provide a supply base and a reception point for new aircraft being delivered to the flying squadrons,
- Repair squadrons at major repair facilities where new aircraft were assembled and parts from old aircraft salvaged, and
- Replacement squadrons for processing and assigning incoming personnel for the flying squadrons.

=== Air Service of the American Expeditionary Force ===
see Organization of the Air Service of the American Expeditionary Force and List of Training Section Air Service airfields

When the United States entered World War I on 6 April 1917, the Aviation Section, U.S. Signal Corps was not ready for the deployment of aviation forces to Europe, and it became necessary to prepare after President Woodrow Wilson's declaration of war.

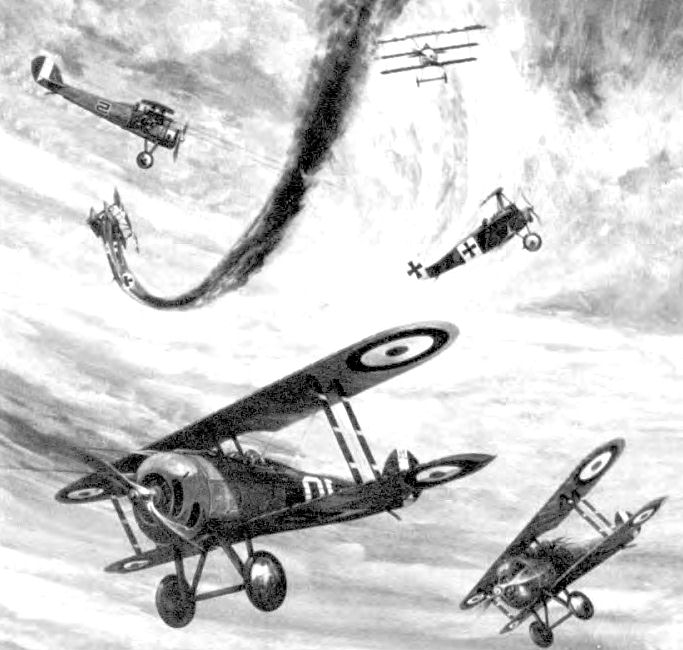
Air Combat – Western Front World War I, Air Service, United States Army

As part of the buildup of forces, aviation units were formed into aero squadrons primarily at Kelly Field, San Antonio, Texas, with additional units being formed at Rockwell Field, San Diego California. Once formed, and prior to their deployment to Europe, Camp Taliaferro, north of Fort Worth, Texas, and several airfields near Toronto, Ontario, Canada were used by the British Royal Flying Corps (RFC) to perform flight training for the new aero squadrons. Camp Hancock, near Augusta, Georgia, was used for training service squadrons of aircraft mechanics as well as flight training.

When ordered to deploy to Europe, most units reported to the Aviation Concentration Center at Garden City, New York, which was the primary port of embankment. Units there were loaded onto transport ships for the transatlantic crossing. Liverpool, England and Brest, France were the primary ports of disembarkation, although other ports were used. Some aero squadrons arriving in England received additional training from the Royal Flying Corps (later Royal Air Force (RAF)), then were attached to RAF squadrons and deployed with them to France. Others received training and were sent to Winchester, Hampshire where they awaited their cross-channel transfer to France, using the port of Southampton.

Upon their arrival in France, the St. Maixent Replacement Barracks was the primary reception center for new aero squadrons assigned to the Air Service American Expeditionary Force. There, units were classified as pursuit, bombardment or as observation units. If necessary, units were assigned to one of several Air Instructional Centers (AIC) for additional combat and gunnery training provided by the French. Once prepared fully for combat, units were sent to the 1st Air Depot at Colombey-les-Belles Airdrome for equipping. Initially equipped with British or French aircraft, later in 1918 American-built Dayton-Wright DH-4 aircraft equipped with American Liberty Engines began to arrive in France. The units were then assigned to one of the combat groups of the First or Second Army Air Service and transfer to their initial combat Aerodrome for combat duty.

Operating from primarily French Air Force (French: Armée de l'Air (ALA) airfields, the squadrons engaged in combat operations against enemy aircraft along the American Sector of the Western Front.

== Chiefs of the Aviation Section ==
- Lt. Col. Samuel Reber (18 July 1914 – 5 May 1916)
- Lt. Col. George O. Squier (20 May 1916 – 19 February 1917)
- Lt. Col. John B. Bennet (20 February 1917 – 30 June 1917) (Note: John Bradbury Bennet, West Point 1891, was a career infantry officer who was one of the four senior officers assigned to the Aviation Field Officers Course in November 1916. He succeeded Squier as head of the division/section in February 1917 when Squier was promoted to major general and named Chief Signal Officer of the Army. After taking command of the 49th Infantry on 29 July 1917, Bennet was promoted to colonel, became commander of the 11th Infantry in March 1918, and led that unit in combat in France. In October 1918 he was promoted to temporary brigadier general, then reverted to his permanent rank of lieutenant colonel in June 1919. After being assigned as a student at the Army War College, he received promotion to permanent colonel in August 1919. Bennet retired in 1925 and was promoted to brigadier general on the retired list on 21 June 1930, shortly before his death.)
- Brig. Gen. Benjamin D. Foulois (30 June 1917 – 12 November 1917)
- Brig. Gen. Alexander L. Dade (12 November 1917 – 27 February 1918) (Note: Alexander Lucien Dade, USMA 1887, was lieutenant colonel of the 7th Cavalry when he attended the course of aviation administration at the Signal Corps Aviation School in San Diego during the winter of 1916–1917. He was promoted to colonel and was made school commander on 11 April 1917, after Col. William A. Glassford was summarily retired. Dade was promoted to temporary general of the Signal Corps on 17 December, with a date of rank of 29 October, and appointed to command the Air Division and by seniority the Aviation Section, after Foulois went to France to command the Air Service of the AEF. Dade's general's commission was discharged in May 1918 when he transferred to the Inspector General's Department. He retired disability line of duty in 1920.)
- Col. Laurence C. Brown (28 February 1918 – 24 April 1918) (Note: Brown served as a private in Troop F, 7th Cavalry between 1894 and 1897, then transferred to the 4th Artillery. He was commissioned in 1898 during the Spanish American War, and two years later was a captain in the permanent establishment. Brown transferred to the Coast Artillery Corps in 1914, where he received his majority. On 5 August 1917 he was one of a large number of mid-career officers detailed to the expanding Aviation Section, where he was promoted to temporary colonel. He returned to the Coast Artillery Corps after World War I, and received his permanent establishment colonelcy on 1 July 1920.)

== Lineage of the United States Air Force ==
- Aeronautical Division, Signal Corps 1 August 1907 – 18 July 1914
- Aviation Section, Signal Corps 18 July 1914 – 20 May 1918
- Division of Military Aeronautics 20 May 1918 – 24 May 1918
- Air Service, United States Army 24 May 1918 – 2 July 1926
- United States Army Air Corps 2 July 1926 – 20 June 1941
- United States Army Air Forces 20 June 1941 – 18 September 1947
- United States Air Force 18 September 1947 – present

== See also ==
- Aeronautical Division, U.S. Signal Corps
- Division of Military Aeronautics
- United States Army Air Service
- List of American Aero Squadrons
- List of American Balloon Squadrons
- List of World War I flying aces from the United States

== Notes ==
=== Citations ===
Preceded by Aeronautical Division, Signal Corps	Aviation Section, Signal Corps; 1914–1918	Succeeded by Division of Military Aeronautics
