= John C. Burkhart =

Aviation pioneer

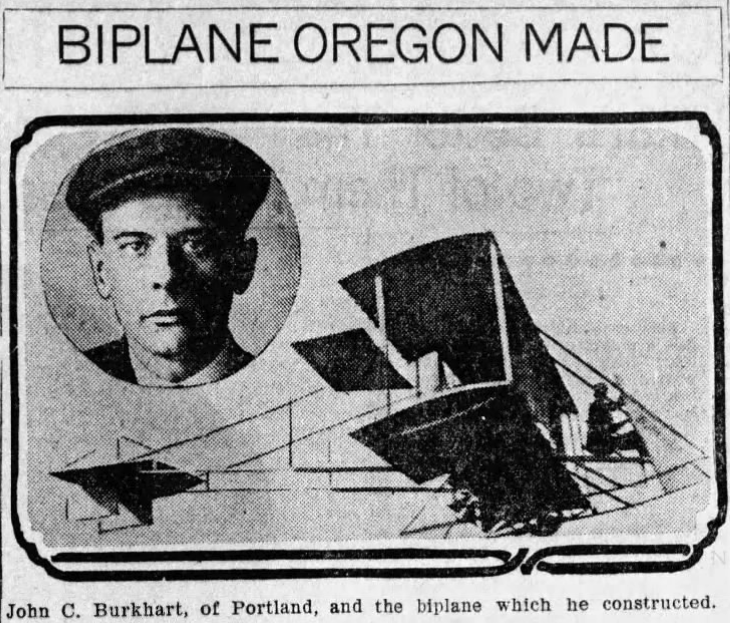
Burkhart and his 1913 biplane

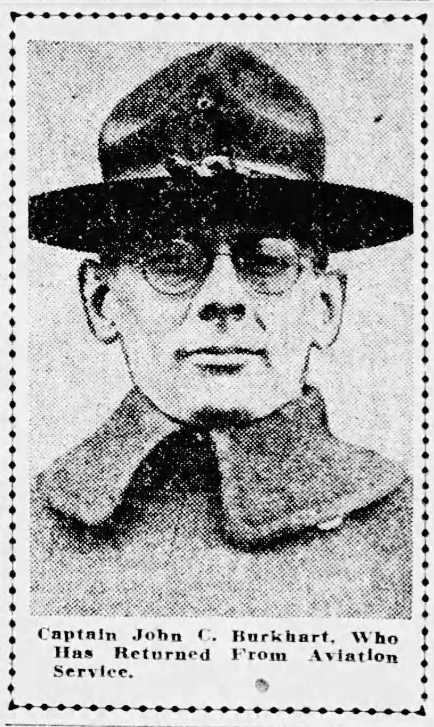
1919 newspaper photo of Captain Burkhart, recently returned to Portland, Oregon, after World War I service in the Division of Military Aeronautics in Washington, D.C.

John Conner Burkhart (1880–1926) was an aviation pioneer in the U.S. state of Oregon.

== Early life and education ==
Burkhart was born in Albany, Oregon, a "member of one of Oregon's pioneer families". His great-grandfather, John Burkhart, was the first postmaster of Albany. While studying aeronautical engineering at Cornell University, he traveled to Kitty Hawk, North Carolina, to photograph the Wright brothers' May 1908 experiments; he was reportedly the only outsider to witness the flights. Back at Cornell, he and Oscar Trolich, a fellow student, built an airplane that "made some successful flights," Fly magazine reported in its December 1908 issue.

Burkhart graduated in 1909, returned to Oregon, and "spent subsequent years experimenting and studying the present machines", the Philadelphia Inquirer wrote.

== Pioneering of aircraft and first flights in Oregon ==
In 1910, Burkhart, who "probably knew more about aeroplanes than any other Oregonian at that time," built the first airplane in Oregon, and flew it in April. He and his mechanic and William Crawford built new airplanes in 1911 and 1912, and flew them at fairs and other events around the state. In 1911, he also served as the associate editor of Aeronautics, an early periodical about aviation.

His 1912 aircraft was a biplane on the model of the Wright brothers’, with control surfaces like the ones developed by Glenn Curtiss. The wings were double-covered with cloth. The structure was of spruce ribs and spars, except for ash spars in the lower center section. The 35-foot wingspan had a total wing area of 364 square feet. "Small skids have recently been placed under the wing tips. These have saved harm to the wings many times and are of value," the Inquirer wrote. "An 8-cylinder engine of 60 horsepower drives direct, anti-clockwise, a 7 by 4.5-foot propellor of the builder's own make." Weighing about 750 pounds empty, the aircraft could fly about 45 mph.

By 1913, Burkhart was giving demonstration flights in Portland, Oregon, flying from a temporary airfield at East 15th and Everett Streets (today's Buckman Field Park). The pair were seeking investors to fund serial production of the aircraft.

== Marriage ==
On June 6, 1913, Burkhart married Mabel Goss, a Portlander, in a family-only ceremony. "The bride is popular socially and in church circles and will be one of the feted matrons of the summer", reported the Albany Democrat, while "Mr. Burkhart is well known in business circles".

== Army service ==
During World War I, Burkhart joined the Aviation Section, U.S. Signal Corps—the U.S. Army's air arm. In 1917, he was stationed in Washington, D.C., at the information and technical section of what would become the Division of Military Aeronautics. He and Mabel took up residence in a Dupont Circle apartment building. He served two months as the engineer officer, First Provisional Wing, at Hazelhurst Field on Long Island. Promoted to captain, he was waiting for overseas orders when the armistice was signed in 1918.

He later described his service:

The growth of the different departments in Washington was hard to realize until one was compelled to wander all over the city trying to locate his office...The airplane division of the Signal Corps grew from a department of about a dozen people to one including thousands of men. In the rapid expansion of organization necessary to direct the procuring of flying fields, equipment and thousands of other details, one of the difficulties was to find office space. The Department of Military Aeronautics moved piecemeal, each branch as best it could. My own branch moved six times in as many months. It was a great privilege for those not fortunate enough to get overseas to meet the foreign aviators attached to the different missions. They were a fine bunch of men, full of pep and hatred for the Hun. The development, production and improvement in the use of the airplane has been one of the greatest results of the war. It must be remembered that there were no fighting airplanes, nor designs for them, in this country when we entered the war. When school closed there were hundreds of Liberty engines and completed airplanes being produced each week.

== Return to civilian life ==
After the war, Burkhart resumed his work as a commercial photographer who traveled around the state to shoot portraits.

In 1920, he and Mabel left Portland for Santa Barbara, California, in search of better health. There, he joined the American Legion, the Reserve Officers Association, and the Santa Barbara Rifle Club.

== Death ==
Burkhart fell seriously ill in late 1925 and died in Santa Barbara on May 16, 1926.
