= Townsend F. Dodd =

US Army aviator (1886–1919)

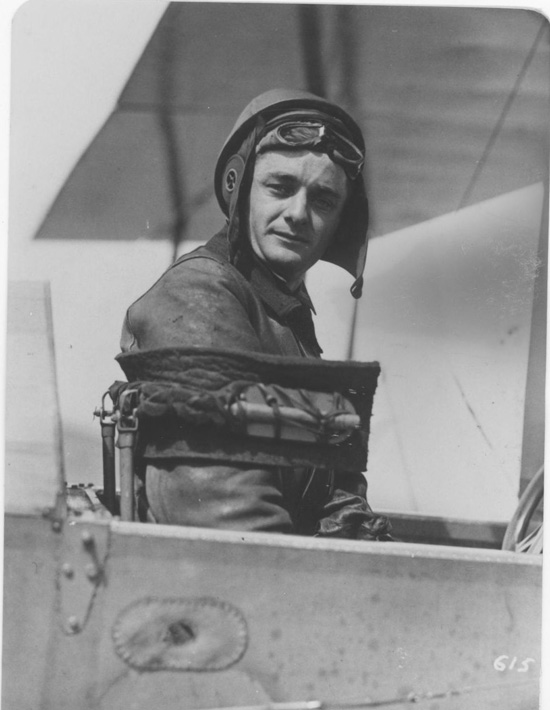
- Captain Dodd seated in his aircraft
- Born: Townsend Foster Dodd; 6 March 1886; Anna, Illinois, U.S.
- Died: 5 October 1919 (aged 33); Bustleton Field, Philadelphia, U.S.
- Burial place: Arlington National Cemetery
- Education: University of Illinois
- Spouse: St Clair Dodd
- Military career
- Allegiance: United States
- Branch: United States Army Air Service
- Active: 1909–1919
- Rank: Colonel
- Commands: Langley Field; Chief of Staff, Material; Chief of Materiel and Assistant Chief of Supply, Air Service; G-2, Air Service, First Army
- Conflicts: Banana Wars; World War I
- Awards: Distinguished Service Medal

Townsend Foster Dodd (6 March 1886 – 5 October 1919) was the first commissioned US Army aviator. As a University of Illinois graduate with a Bachelor of Science in electrical engineering, he joined the Coast Artillery Corps and shortly thereafter became an aviator in the US Army Air Service. Dodd sat on many boards of review during the service's infancy and was one of the members who condemned pusher planes in favor of tractors. He served with General John Pershing on the Mexican Border where he set records for endurance flying. During World War I he was first assigned as the aviation officer of the American Expeditionary Force in 1917. He was later replaced by Colonel Billy Mitchell and was reassigned to the Bolling Mission.

He was the first US pilot to receive the Distinguished Service Medal during World War I. Dodd was promoted to colonel on 14 August 1918 and at the end of the war he was appointed the Chief of Staff, Material under Mitchell. Dodd was then posted to Fort Sam Houston at San Antonio. With the completion of the war he reverted to his pre-war rank of captain and became the commander of Langley Field, Hampton, Virginia. After returning home from the war he competed in endurance flight competitions and during one such contest he crashed and died. Nine years after his death Dodd Army Airfield was named in his honor.

== Biography ==
Dodd was born on 6 March 1886 to Zachary Taylor Dodd and Ruth Anna Dodd (née McLean) in Illinois. Dodd attended the University of Illinois, from where he graduated in 1907 with a Bachelor of Science in Electrical Engineering degree. Ruth Dodd was one of the Charter Members of the Order of the Eastern Star of Illinois. (Note: Howard, pp. 199) He was married to St Clair Dodd with whom he had no children.

== Military career ==
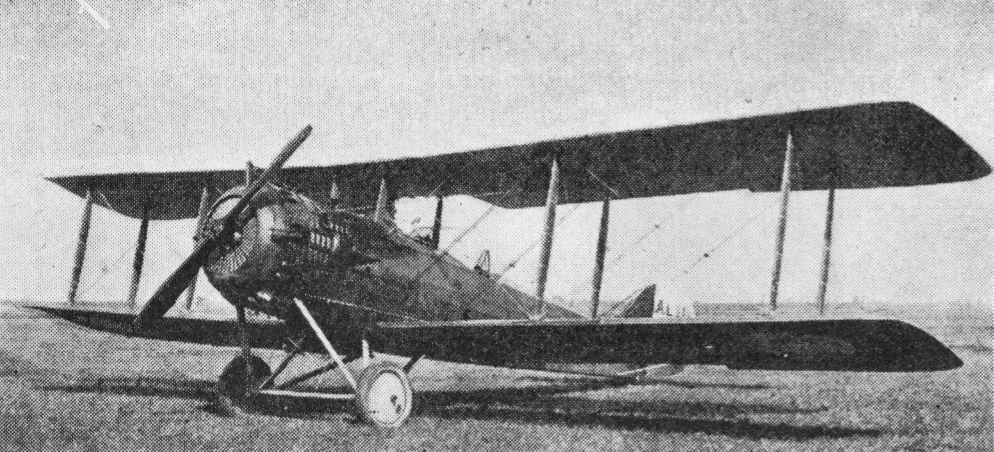
A Salmson 2A2

=== Pre-World War I ===
On 25 September 1909, Dodd was commissioned as a second lieutenant in the Coast Artillery Corps. He was transferred to the Aviation Section, Signal Corps in 1912. While there he became a fully qualified military aviator. In the War Department General Order #39, dated 27 May 1913, Dodd was listed as one of the "original military aviators". On 14 February 1914, he established a non-stop duration of flight record, accompanied by co-pilot, Sgt. Herbert Marcus, an aircraft mechanic and also a member of the US Signal Corps, by flying 244.18 miles in 4 hours, 43 minutes in aircraft SC 26 (a Burgess Model H). Promoted to the rank of first lieutenant, Dodd was ordered to join the 1st Aero Squadron at Texas City, Texas, on 9 March 1913. In June Dodd, along with his squadron, transferred to the San Diego Signal Corps Aviation School (now known as Rockwell Field). There he participated in various flight experiments and sat on boards to establish training requirements and aircraft specifications. Dodd qualified as a military aviator on 30 December 1913.

The Aeronautical Department experienced a spate of fatal accidents between 1912 and 1913, most involving the Wright Model C airplane. A board of aviators, including Dodd, was convened to investigate safety concerns and make recommendations. Dodd, along with Captain Benjamin Foulois and Lieutenants Walter R. Taliaferro, Carleton G. Chapman, and Joseph E. Carberry, condemned not just the Wright C but all "pusher" aircraft as unsafe on 16 February 1914, and those remaining in the Army inventory were ordered to be immediately grounded. (Note: Hennessy (1958), p. 103.) The following month, the board drew up specifications for a tractor-configured training airplane. (Note: Foulois (1968), pp.100) Dodd was involved in the aftermath of a major incident in 1914, which became known as the Goodier Court Martial. The commanding officer of the 1st Aero Squadron's 2nd Company at San Diego, Capt. Lewis E. Goodier, was seriously injured in a demonstration accident on 5 November 1914. Goodier was flying with Glenn L. Martin in a new aircraft when they stalled during a required competitive slow speed test and, when Martin over corrected with too much throttle, went into what was described as the first tailspin. (Note: Hennessy (1958), p. 123.) Goodier suffered a nearly severed nose, two broken legs, a re-opened skull fracture, and a severe puncture of his knee from the drive shaft. After a cursory review of the crashes, school commandant Capt. Arthur S. Cowan, (Note: Cowan was an 1899 graduate of the United States Military Academy and had risen rapidly in rank through transfers and assignments to the Service Schools. He moved from the Infantry to the Signal Corps in March 1909, then in 1910 headed the Aeronautical Division at the age of 35. He personally recruited Henry H. Arnold for pilot duties. He was Signal Officer of the 2nd Division in Texas City, Texas, when Capt. Charles deF. Chandler was relieved and transferred to the Philippines over differences with his pilots. Temporarily assigned to command the provisional 1st Aero Squadron, he was made commandant of the Signal Corps Aviation School when the squadron returned to the school in June 1913.) dismissed the pilots as "nothing but amateurs". (Note: Cameron (1999), p. 68.) (Note: Cowan's statement was made to and included in the Inspector General's report investigating the crashes as justification of his decision.) While recuperating, Goodier assisted Dodd and 1st Lt. Walter Taliaferro in an attempt to prefer charges against Cowan for fraudulently collecting flight pay when he was neither certified to fly nor on flying duty. (Note: Johnson (2001), p.122) (Note: Cowan's total flight experience was 24 minutes of "grass-cutting" – tethered flying in short, straight hops just above the ground.) These charges were dismissed as being laid out of malice. (Note: Hennessy (1958), p. 124.)

Dodd went with the 1st Aero to Galveston during the Vera Cruz incident in 1914, then to Fort Sill. Following a promotion to captain, Dodd and his observer, Lieutenant S. W. Fitzgerald, won the third annual contest for the Mackay aviation trophy when he descended at North Island after a trip of three hours and three minutes. The contest for the Mackay Trophy involved serial reconnaissance of troops maneuvering in the vicinity of San Diego and reports of their numbers and disposition. Accidents eliminated all machines but theirs and the trophy would not have been awarded that year if Fitzgerald had not provided a comprehensive and accurate report of the composition and location of the troops.

On 12 March 1916, Dodd was appointed as a pilot to the 1st Aero Squadron, under General John Pershing's 8th Brigade, which was positioned on the Mexican border. As the pilot of Airplane #44, he and his observer, Captain Benjamin Foulois, made the first reconnaissance flight into Mexico on 15 March 1916. Throughout the rest of March and early April they would fly deep into Mexico to observe troop movements and fly dispatches to other bases. (Note: Maurer (1978), pp.75–88) Upon the completion of his work in Mexico he remained with the 1st Aero Squadron and was promoted to major in May 1917.

=== World War I ===
While serving under Pershing, Dodd gained experience and was appointed to a staff position as the Aviation Officer within the American Expeditionary Force (AEF), when it was raised for overseas service during World War I. Before sailing to France, on 27 May 1917, Dodd sent his assistant, Lt. Birdseye B. Lewis, to New York with instructions to round-up qualified candidates for the aviation staff. Among the applicants was auto race car driver, Edward V. Rickenbacker, who was promptly enlisted as a sergeant first class, chauffeur. (Note: Walsh (2011), pp.255) Upon his arrival in Europe in late 1917, Dodd was appointed lieutenant colonel in the Signal Corps.

As an Aviation Officer it was Dodd's job to liaise with, and understand, the Allies' needs, requirements, and recommendations. To do so he spent several days in London where he spoke to the US Military Attaché, Colonel William Lassiter, and various British officials. Dodd submitted his report to the AEF on 20 June 1917 with a recommendation on what needed to be done. Dodd first used the term "Air Service" in a memo to the chief of staff of the AEF on 20 June 1917. The term also appeared on 5 July 1917, in AEF General Order No. 8, in tables detailing staff organization and duties. The Air Service, American Expeditionary Forces was formally created on 3 September 1917 when General Order 31 was published, and remained in being until demobilized in 1919. (Note: Greer (1985), pp. 149) Dodd, however, had been superseded as Aviation Officer by Colonel William Mitchell, who outranked him. Mitchell replaced Dodd on 30 June 1917, with the position renamed "Chief of Air Service" and its duties changed and rewritten. (Note: Fredrickson (2011), pp. 14–15 and 20)

The Bolling Commission (also known as the Bolling Mission and named after Colonel Raynal Bolling, the head of the mission) was an aeronautical commission sent to Europe on behalf of the Aircraft Production Board of the Council of National Defense. (Note: Maurer (1978), pp.53) Dodd was assigned to the mission, after being replaced as Aviation Officer. His assignment was to evaluate aircraft for use by the AEF, specifically for reconnaissance purposes. Dodd evaluated French aircraft and favored adopting the Salmson two-seater for reconnaissance work. Eventually 705 Salmsons were purchased for the Air Service; of these 557 saw front-line service.

Along with several other graduates of the Aviation Section's winter 1916 "Field Officers Course", Dodd was given a temporary wartime promotion to colonel and under the command of General William L. Kenly, Dodd was named Director of Air Service Instruction (DAI). An artillery officer, Kenly had been the Executive Officer of the Aviation School in San Diego before the outbreak of war and instructed Dodd, Bolling and Mitchell. Bolling and Mitchell were also promoted, with Bolling being appointed to the role of Director of Air Service Supply (DASS) to administer the "Zone of the Line of Communications" (sic), later called the Service of Supply. Kenly proved to be only an interim commander, though, and on 27 November 1917 he was replaced by Brig. Gen. Benjamin Foulois who arrived in France with a large but untrained staff of non-aviators. This resulted in considerable resentment from Mitchell's smaller, established, staff, many of whom, including Bolling and Dodd, were immediately displaced. Dodd, Bolling, and Mitchell resented their being replaced by non-aviators and after leaving the theater of operations all continued to further the Air Service in their own ways.

==== Distinguished Service Medal ====
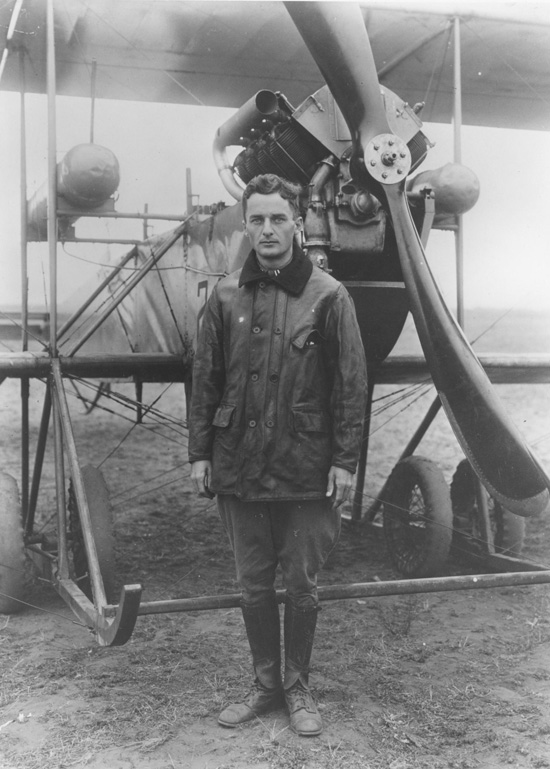
Captain Dodd standing in front of his aircraft

During Dodd's service in World War I he was the first US pilot to receive the Distinguished Service Medal. His citation reads:

The President of the United States of America, authorized by Act of Congress, July 9, 1918, takes pleasure in presenting the Army Distinguished Service Medal to Colonel (Air Service) Townsend F. Dodd, United States Army Air Service, for exceptionally meritorious and distinguished services to the Government of the United States, in a duty of great responsibility during World War I. Colonel Dodd organized the Aviation Training School at Issoudun and successfully conducted the negotiations for the first purchase of aeroplanes from allied governments for the use of the American Expeditionary Forces. He later served with distinction as Chief of the Supply Section, Air Service, American Expeditionary Forces, and as Technical Advisor and Information Officer of the Chief of the Air Service, 1st Army.

=== Post-war service ===
Having been promoted to the rank of colonel on 14 August 1918, by the end of the war Dodd was appointed Chief of Staff, Material under Brigadier General Billy Mitchell. Dodd was then posted to Fort Sam Houston at San Antonio where he served as Chief of Materiel and Assistant Chief of Supply, Air Service, and then as G-2, Air Service, First Army. With the completion of the war he reverted to his pre-war rank of captain and became the commander of Langley Field, Hampton, Virginia.

== Death and legacy ==
While Dodd was the commander of Langley Field he was killed in an air crash. The crash occurred on 5 October 1919 at Bustleton Field, Philadelphia, during the New York to San Francisco transcontinental air race. (Note: New York Times, p.1) On 1 May 1928 Remount Station #1 was named Dodd Army Airfield, the nation's first dedicated military airfield. Dodd Army Airfield was an airfield located within the current boundaries of Fort Sam Houston in San Antonio, Texas. Dodd Field includes the area bounded on the north by Rittiman Road, on the west by Harry Wurzbach Memorial Highway, on the south by Winans (formerly Dashiell) Road and on the east by the Fort Sam Houston Reservation boundary. Dodd Field was designated in War Department General Order Number 5. Prior to deployment to Europe for World War I Dodd had served at the remount station and had been Commander of the Aviation Post when the 3rd Aero Squadron was stationed there. He was buried in Arlington National Cemetery. Active flight operations were terminated in October 1931, although the official date of closure of Dodd Field as an aviation facility has not been determined.
