= T67 =

T67 may refer to:

== Aviation ==
- Continental T67, an experimental turboshaft engine
- Hicks Airfield, in Tarrant County, Texas, United States
- Hunter T 67, a British-built trainer
- Slingsby T67 Firefly, a British aerobatic trainer

== Other uses ==
- Cooper T67, a British racing car
- HMS Scorpion (T67), a gunboat of the Royal Navy
- INS Batti Malv (T67), a patrol boat of the Indian Navy
