= Byron Q. Jones =

American aviation pioneer and military officer

Byron Quinby Jones
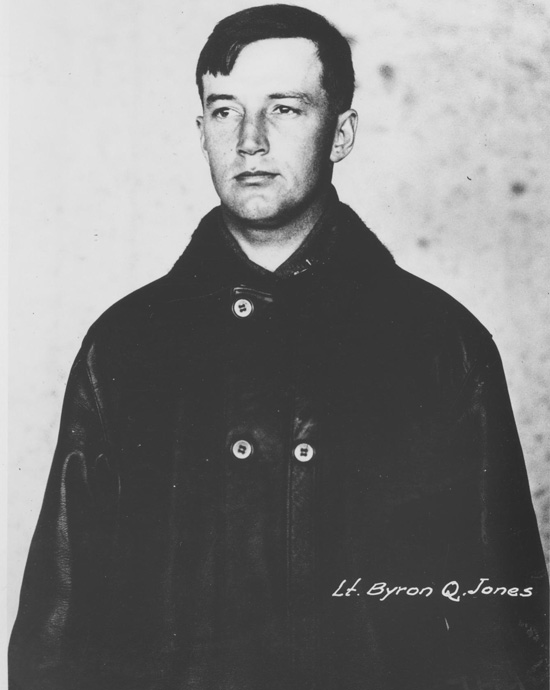
- Byron Q. Jones, c. 1915
- Born: April 9, 1888; Henrietta, New York, U.S.
- Died: March 30, 1959 (aged 70); Washington, D.C., U.S.
- Military career
- Allegiance: United States
- Branch: Cavalry, United States Army; Aviation Section, Signal Corps; Air Service, United States Army; United States Army Air Corps; Cavalry, United States Army
- Service years: 1912–1944
- Rank: Colonel
- Nickname: B.Q.
- Commands: 4th Composite Group; 8th Attack Squadron; 2d Bombardment Wing; 2nd Sqdn, 13th Cavalry (Mech)
- Conflicts: World War II

Byron Quinby Jones (April 9, 1888 – March 30, 1959) was a pioneer aviator and an officer in the United States Army. Jones began and ended his career as a cavalry officer, but for a quarter century between 1914 and 1939, he was an aviator in the various organizations that were the Army's air arm. He appeared to be on track in the 1930s to becoming one of the senior commanders of the Air Corps, but his views on the role of airpower diverged from those of his Air Corps peers and he returned to the Army's ground forces at the beginning of World War II.

== Early life ==
Jones was born on April 9, 1888, near Henrietta, New York, to Samuel Titus Jones and Sarah Minerva Quinby. His family moved to Rochester, where he graduated from Public School 24 and East High School.

After a year of study at the Massachusetts Institute of Technology (MIT), Jones was appointed to the United States Military Academy by Representative James Breck Perkins of New York, and entered the Class of 1911 on June 15, 1907.

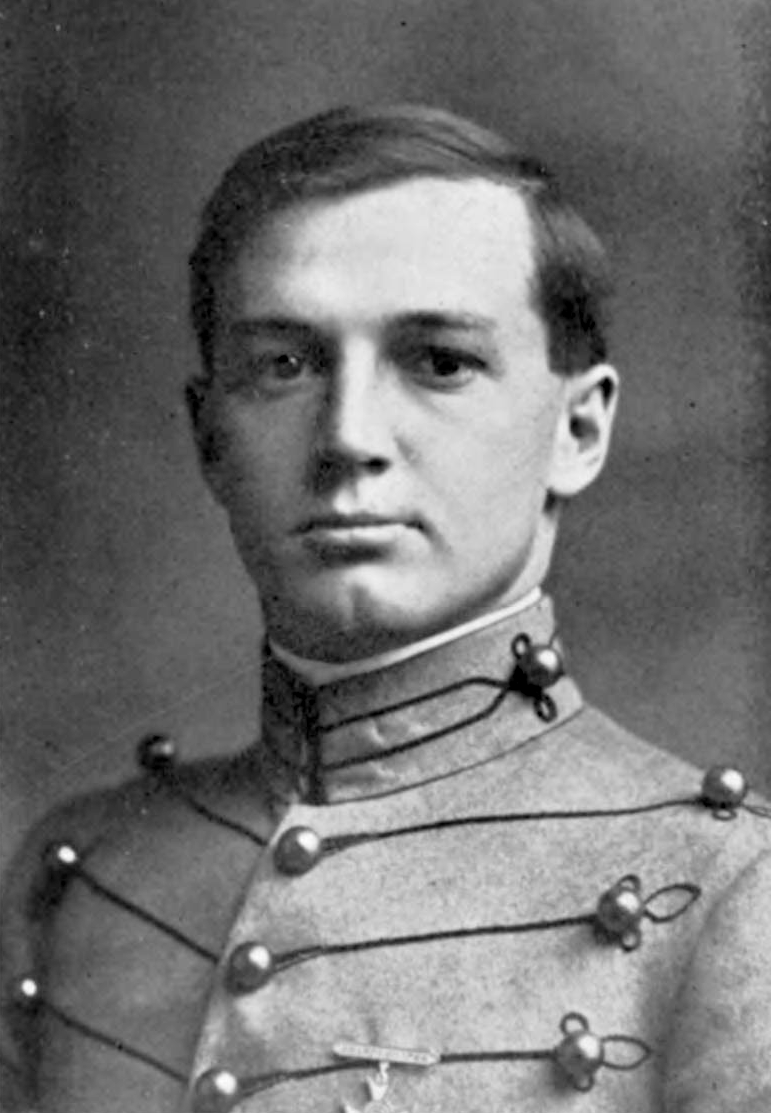
At West Point in 1912

Following an unremarkable fourth class (plebe) year, Jones performed summer training duties in 1908 between June 16 and July 11 for the incoming Class of 1912, out of which eight upperclassmen, including Jones and five other third class cadets, were accused of hazing violations, some of which involved the beating of the new plebes, prohibited by law since March 1901. As a result of three days of disciplinary hearings convened July 17, 1908, the eight cadets were recommended for dismissal from the academy. The specification against Jones, that he "inaugurated" a new form of punishment for plebes in which they were required to double time, was found to be "conclusive" by the testimony of all cadets called before the board. Jones affirmed that he had double-timed every plebe in his company, but denied that any serious violations of hazing had occurred.

Despite the scandalous notoriety of the incident, supporters of the cadets mounted a campaign directly to President Theodore Roosevelt, who had signed the no-hazing law that had resulted in their dismissal. On August 20, Roosevelt ordered the third class cadets reinstated but suspended with loss of all pay and allowances until June 15, 1909. After Roosevelt approved the December 1908 recommendation of the superintendent of West Point, Colonel Hugh L. Scott, that they be permitted to return to the academy, Jones and the other third class cadets joined the same class that they had hazed on February 1, 1909. Jones graduated on June 12, 1912, 27th in a class of 95.

== Military career ==
=== Signal Corps ===
Jones entered active duty and was commissioned as a second lieutenant in the 14th Cavalry. He performed troop duty at Fort Clark and Marfa, Texas from September 14, 1912, to December 2, 1913, when he volunteered for pilot instruction. Jones was detached to the Aeronautical Division, U.S. Signal Corps and assigned to the Signal Corps Aviation School at North Field in San Diego, California, on December 5, 1913.

He was taught to fly by civilian instructor Oscar A. Brindley and assigned to the 2nd Company, 1st Aero Squadron on August 5, 1914. On August 19, he earned his rating of Junior Military Aviator (JMA) and was immediately placed on flight status. Congress expanded the air arm into the Aviation Section, U.S. Signal Corps in July 1914, and Jones remained assigned to the 1st Aero Squadron until September 23, 1915, when he returned to MIT for a post-graduate course on aeronautical engineering, the first such course ever, graduating on June 7, 1916. While at MIT, Jones served with both Milling and Captain Virginius E. Clark on the Technical Aero Advisory and Inspection Board in April and May 1916, testing aircraft and balloons at the Curtiss Aviation School in Newport News, Virginia, for possible use in Mexico.

During 1915, Jones set two flight duration records: for an aviator alone with a flight time of eight hours and 53 minutes flying S.C. 31, a new Martin TT tractor airplane, on January 15, and for an aviator and two passengers with a flight time of seven hours and five minutes flying S.C. 28, a Burgess H with extra fuel tanks, on March 12, both at North Field. For these flights, Jones received the Mackay Trophy. On July 2 at San Diego, he became the first army pilot to execute a loop and stall an airplane without crashing, and on December 12, to execute a tail spin, flying S.C. 30, a Curtiss J tractor on both flights.

Jones and First Lieutenant Thomas D. Milling, while on temporary duty from mid-April to late May 1915 at Brownsville, Texas, flew the first United States Army aerial reconnaissance mission under combat conditions (Note: Civilian pilot Philip Orin Parmelee and Lieutenant Benjamin Foulois had flown a reconnaissance mission under non-combat conditions during US Army maneuvers in Texas in 1911.) on April 20, 1915. Using one end of the cavalry drill field at Fort Brown as a landing strip, the pair flew S.C. 31 to observe for movements of Pancho Villa, with Jones piloting and Milling to record the location of Villa's troops. Their morning flight was uneventful, but on their afternoon sortie, despite being on the American side of the Rio Grande, they were fired upon by at least one machine gun, the first time an American military pilot had ever come under fire. Jones climbed to 2,600 feet (790 m) and returned to Fort Brown with both men unscathed. After landing, Jones taxied S.C. 31 into a ditch at Fort Brown and damaged it beyond repair; the chief of the Aviation Section refused to replace the aircraft until pressured to do so on May 1. (Note: The chief of the Aviation Section, Lieutenant Colonel Samuel Reber, was a career signal officer and a non-flyer. At the time of the incident he was also the acting Chief Signal Officer. Considerable friction over safety issues existed between Reber and the young flyers that culminated in 1916 with Reber's censure and replacement.)

On July 26, 1915, Jones and the 1st Aero Squadron moved by train to Fort Sill, Oklahoma, to work with the field artillery. In August, Jones was part of a detachment of two planes and four pilots sent to the Mexican border at Brownsville. On September 5, the detachment commander, First Lieutenant Joseph C. Morrow, was severely injured in a crash of one of their Curtiss JN2 airplanes, making Jones acting detachment commander. He promptly filed a report that the heavy, underpowered JN2s were too inherently dangerous to use as military aircraft, and that the artillery officers they were to train as observers had refused to fly with them. As a result, the JN2s were grounded on September 13 by the commanding general of the Southern Department, (Note: Major General Frederick Funston. It was the second time in four years that a Southern Department commanding general had grounded aircraft, the other being in May 1911 after the fatal crash of Lieutenant George E.M. Kelly.) and in January their use discontinued by the Aviation Section.

Upon completion of his engineering course, Jones returned to the Aviation School, where he was promoted to first lieutenant, Cavalry, on July 1, 1916, and transferred in grade on the same date to the Field Artillery when an increase in the peacetime strength of the army authorized by the National Defense Act of 1916 resulted in the creation of 15 new regiments. At San Diego, his duties included instruction in aeronautical theory to pilot candidates, engineering support for the 1st Aero Squadron in Mexico with the Punitive Expedition, and Officer-in-charge of Engineering and Repair.

=== World War I and the Air Service ===
While still on duty at the Aviation School, Jones received a promotion on May 15, 1917, to captain, Field Artillery, in the first wave of officer promotions following the entry of the United States into World War I. At the beginning of June, he reported to the Office of the Chief Signal Officer (OCSO) in Washington, D.C. for temporary staff duty assisting Major Raynal Bolling in standardizing airplane specifications for the aviation services of the Army and the United States Navy preparatory to Bolling's mission to Europe on behalf of the Aircraft Production Board.

On June 30, he reported to the newly leased aviation field at Mount Clemens, Michigan, soon renamed Selfridge Field, where he organized and commanded an aviation school. On September 27, after reaching the legal requirement of three years' pilot experience as a JMA, he was awarded the advanced pilot rating of Military Aviator, one of the first in the Aviation Section to do so. His duties at Selfridge continued until October 23, 1917, when he received a temporary commission as lieutenant colonel in the Signal Corps to act as an observer for the OCSO during an inspection tour of aviation schools in the United States and Canada. On November 30, he returned to Washington to assume the duties of Chief of Air Service Training in the OCSO until April 22, 1918, when the Division of Military Aeronautics (DMA) was created to remove aviation from the purview of the OCSO. He was immediately sent to Europe to observe the training methods of British, French and American aviation schools.

Jones returned from Europe on June 12 and was assigned to the office of the Director of Military Aeronautics. In his absence, the DMA had replaced the Aviation Section as the nation's air arm when President Woodrow Wilson issued an executive order on May 20 removing all military aviation activities from the overtaxed Signal Corps, and then itself had been merged with the Bureau of Aircraft Production as the Air Service. As an indirect consequence, Jones reverted to his permanent establishment rank of captain when his Signal Corps commission was discharged on July 9. His new duties were with the Engineering Division at Wilbur Wright Field, Fairfield, Ohio, testing and evaluating new aviation equipment. On November 4, he was again promoted to lieutenant colonel (temporary, Air Service) and assigned as officer in charge of all test and evaluation there.

In December 1918, with the war ended, Jones became commandant of the aviation school at Wilbur Wright Field until December 1919, when he was transferred to the Executive of the Director of Air Service in Washington as an Engineering Representative, with membership on the Joint Army and Navy Board on Aeronautics. On March 15, 1920, the wartime temporary promotions of Air Service officers expired, and Jones reverted a second time to his permanent rank of captain. Jones transferred from the Field Artillery to the Air Service on July 1, 1920, the date that the Air Service became a statutory combatant arm of the line, commissioned as a major.

He then went on an extended leave of absence of three months in New York City "trying out a position in civil life." On July 3, the designations for all aeronautical ratings were changed and Jones received a new rating of Airplane Pilot, which also qualified him for the rating of Airplane Observer.

Returning to his military duties in October 1920, he completed his assignment at the headquarters of the Air Service in April 1921. He was sent to the Philippines, arriving in July 1921, to serve as Air Officer, Philippine Department at its headquarters in Manila, and concurrently as commanding officer of the 4th Composite Group. When his overseas tour ended in July 1923, Jones returned to Washington D.C. and the office of the Chief of Air Service in September 1923 as Assistant Chief of the Supply Group, a position he held until March 1925, when he became Chief of Property and Requirements Section. Between November and December 1925, he performed additional duty as technical advisor to the prosecution during the court martial proceedings against Brigadier General Billy Mitchell.

=== Air Corps ===
Jones' first assignment as a member of the Air Corps was as a student officer at the Army Industrial College between February and July 1926, followed by a tour as student officer at the Command and General Staff School at Fort Leavenworth, Kansas, from September 1926 to June 1927. Following his graduation, he was assigned as Air Officer, Seventh Corps Area, at Omaha, Nebraska, between July 1927 and May 16, 1928. He then attended the Army War College in Washington, D.C., graduating July 1, 1929, and was immediately assigned to the G-2 Division of the War Department General Staff that date. He organized the newly activated 8th Pursuit Group at Langley Field, Virginia, on June 25, 1932, and commanded it until February 1934.

In that month, President Franklin D. Roosevelt canceled mail contracts between the United States Post Office and commercial airlines as the result of a scandal, and gave the task of delivering air mail to the Air Corps. The project, known as the Army Air Corps Mail Operation (AACMO), divided the country into three zones, with Jones placed in charge of the Eastern Zone. He established his headquarters at Floyd Bennett Field in Brooklyn, New York, and later at Mitchel Field on Long Island. Flight operations commenced on February 19 in severe winter weather. By February 24, there were three crashes in the Eastern Zone, two of them fatal. Jones instituted a number of operational restrictions in the interest of safety, but these were often disregarded by his pilots, many of whom were inexperienced young reservists. AACMO continued into June 1934, and Jones' report of his zone's activities was published and widely read.

Following the mail operation, Jones was given command of the 2d Bombardment Wing at Langley Field in November 1934. In January and February 1935, in a run-up exercise to the service test of the General Headquarters Air Force (GHQAF), Jones directed a force of 81 aircraft, an airship, and more than 350 men in maneuvers conducted throughout the southeastern United States, organizing them into opposing "Red" and "White Force" provisional units, to demonstrate the ability of Air Corps units to operate in the field from continuously changing bases. On March 1, 1935, the 2nd Wing became a part of GHQAF, and command of it carried a temporary rank of brigadier general. Jones was not selected to fill the new billet. Dispossessed of his command assignment, Jones was attached to the General Staff's War Plans Division and placed on the faculty of the Army War College as an instructor. He was promoted to the permanent rank of lieutenant colonel, Air Corps, in August 1935, and to the temporary rank of colonel the following year on August 26.

In the fall of 1937, Jones lectured in the Army War College's course on the use of military airpower. Using attaché reports from both the Spanish Civil War and the Second Italo-Abyssinian War, Jones reiterated the long-standing position of the General Staff that airpower was of limited value when employed independently, declared that the "Flying Fortress concept had died in Spain", (Note: German and Italian high-altitude bombing had been both ineffective militarily and a cause of defiance among the Spanish population.) and that airpower was useful mainly as "long range artillery." Air Corps officers in the G-3 Department of the General Staff rejected Jones' conclusions as inconsistent with Training Regulation TR 440-15 Employment of the Air Forces of the Army (then current Air Corps doctrine), although their views were dismissed by the Deputy Chief of Staff.

In March 1938, the War Department offered Jones command of the 18th Wing in Hawaii, which also included temporary promotion to brigadier general. However Jones declined the position, stating in his submission to Cullum's Biographical Register in 1940 (Note: The Biographical Register is a nine-volume work covering all USMA graduates between 1802 and 1949. The editors were fellow graduates who solicited and organized information from living graduates, and from War Department records for deceased or separated graduates. The task was massive. Supplements to the original volume were compiled at the end of every decade through 1950 and often took several years to complete for publication. For career officers such as Jones, the entries are autobiographical.) that he did so "because of desire of superiors to retain his services within continental U.S." (sic) He remained as a senior instructor at the Army War College in his temporary rank of colonel until September 1939. He then returned to the ground forces, becoming a battalion commander in the 13th Cavalry (Mechanized) at Fort Knox, Kentucky. On November 7, 1939, Jones left the Air Corps and formally transferred back to the Cavalry branch in the rank of lieutenant colonel. (Note: The supposition from biographers such as Heaton, of course, is that Jones was coerced out of the Air Corps for having views on the role of the service contrary to his peers, going back at least to the Mitchell court-martial. All general officer ranks in the Air Corps were temporary, allotted to specific positions, a system that did not change until the first pre-war expansion in October 1940. It is difficult to imagine Jones turning down flag rank for the reason given unless he was wary of retribution once his term ended. Other officers in the Air Service and Air Corps (Mitchell, Foulois, Arnold and Andrews most notably) had encountered such retribution, but previously the presumed antagonist was the General Staff, not the senior Air Corps hierarchy.)

=== World War II ===
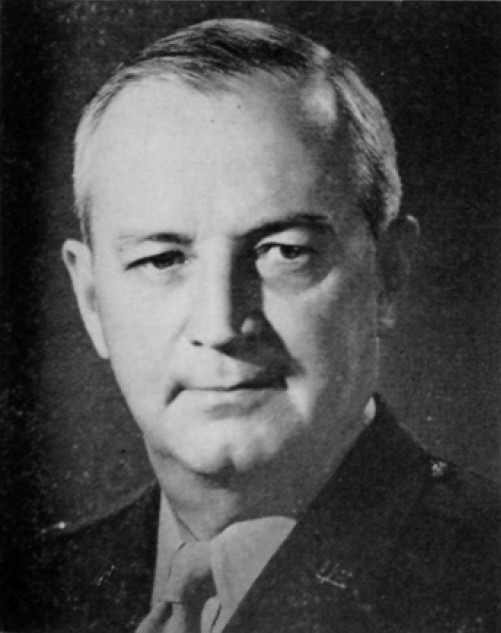
Jones during World War II

Soon after his return to the Cavalry, Jones attended the Cavalry School at Fort Riley, Kansas, for a 30-day student officer course. When he returned to the Fort Knox, he was elevated on January 2, 1940, to regimental Executive Officer. The 13th Mechanized Cavalry was a component of the 7th Cavalry Brigade (Mechanized), the Army's only combined-arms mechanized force in 1939, and Jones returned at a time when advocates of mechanization struggled to overcome resistance from horse-cavalry proponents, including the Chief of Cavalry, Major General John K. Herr. While at Fort Knox, Jones became "an early and persistent advocate of light aviation [for air-armor coordination]" and "the intellectual force behind...a full-scale endorsement of flivver aircraft [with] cavalry pilots" organic to mechanized cavalry units. (Note: Herr had twice been Jones' instructor, first in History and Tactics at the Academy, then in 1928–1929 at the Army War College. They also had in common being expelled and reinstated for hazing incidents while cadets at the Academy, so that Jones had some influence on Herr in the mechanization controversy. However, Herr also illustrates why the advocates for a separate Air Force were often strident in their views, in that while he was lukewarm about organic aviation for the ground forces in general, he favored development of the helicopter for the Cavalry using funds appropriated for the Air Corps.)

In June 1940, Jones was admitted to Walter Reed General Hospital on an extended medical leave of six months. After his release to full duty, he served at Fort Bliss, Texas, as commanding officer, Special Troops, 1st Cavalry Division, from December 9, 1940, to June 16, 1941. In the expansion of the Army leading up to American participation in World War II, he transferred to Providence, Rhode Island, to become Anti-Tank Officer of 6th Army Corps on October 4, 1941, where he was stationed when the Japanese attack on Pearl Harbor took place.

He received promotion to permanent colonel on February 1, 1942. On July 9, 1942, Jones was ordered to the Southwest Pacific Area (SWPA), when he served from August 14 to February 5, 1943, during the Guadalcanal Campaign. On March 27 he began his final career assignment at Camp Pickett, Virginia, as commanding officer, Special Troops, Second Army to August 22. Jones subsequently retired from the Army with a line-of-duty medical disability on January 31, 1944.

== Patents ==
Even though the first major production series of the quarter-ton truck known as the "Jeep" had been of the design submitted by Willys, the Army had a strong interest in establishing ownership of the design. Jones filed an application to be certified as the inventor on behalf of the Army, covering "various aspects of the design and construction of the Jeep body" with the United States Patent Office on October 8, 1941, stating in the application that "The invention described herein, if patented, may be manufactured and used by or for the Government for governmental purposes without the payment of any royalty thereon". Patent 2,278,450 for a "Military Vehicle Body" was granted on April 7, 1942.

Jones was himself an inventor. The March 1944 issue of Popular Science described his proposal for a lightweight amphibious tank, and he was issued several patents:

- a steering by driving mechanism, granted June 17, 1941
- a multiple differential, granted November 3, 1942
- an armored vehicle body, granted September 28, 1943
- possibly a diaphragm muffler, granted March 22, 1927 to a Byron Q. Jones of Washington, D.C.
- possibly a wind indicating airways beacon, granted June 27, 1933 to Byron Q. Jones of Washington, D.C.

In all the above patent applications except that of the muffler, there is a stipulation that "The invention described herein may be manufactured and used by or for the Government for governmental purposes without the payment to me of any royalty thereon."

== Death ==
He died on March 30, 1959, at age 70 at Walter Reed Army Medical Center of a heart ailment. He was predeceased by less than a year by his wife, Evelyn Kennerly Chadwick Jones, whom he had married on June 4, 1917, shortly after the United States entered World War I. Jones and his wife are buried at Arlington National Cemetery.

== Notes ==
Footnotes

Citations
