= Hicks Field =

Former US military airfield in Tarrant County, Texas

Hicks Field Camp Taliaferro Field #1
- Located near Saginaw, Texas
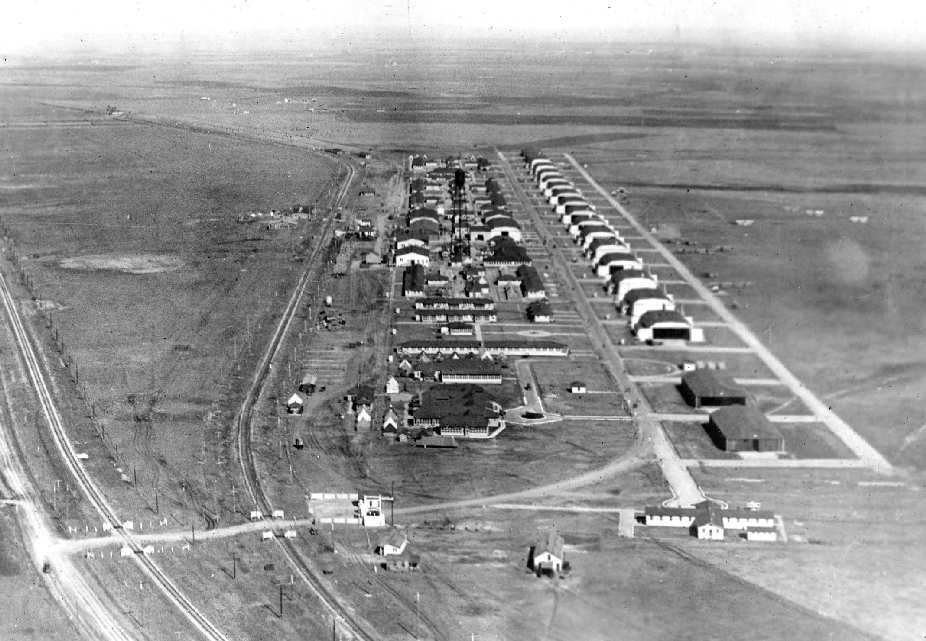
- Hicks Field, Texas, 1918

Site information
- Type: Pilot training airfield
- Controlled by: Royal Flying Corps (1916); Air Service, United States Army (1917–1920); United States Navy (1920–1940); United States Army Air Forces (1940–1945)
- Condition: Redeveloped as industrial park

Location
- Coordinates: 32°54′44″N 97°24′05″W Hicks Field; 32°54′58″N 97°25′23″W Bombing Target

Site history
- Built: 1916
- In use: 1916–1945 (military), 1945–ca.1976 (civil airfield)
- Battles/wars: World War I World War II

Garrison information
- Garrison: Training Section, Air Service (World War I); Army Air Force Training Command (World War I)

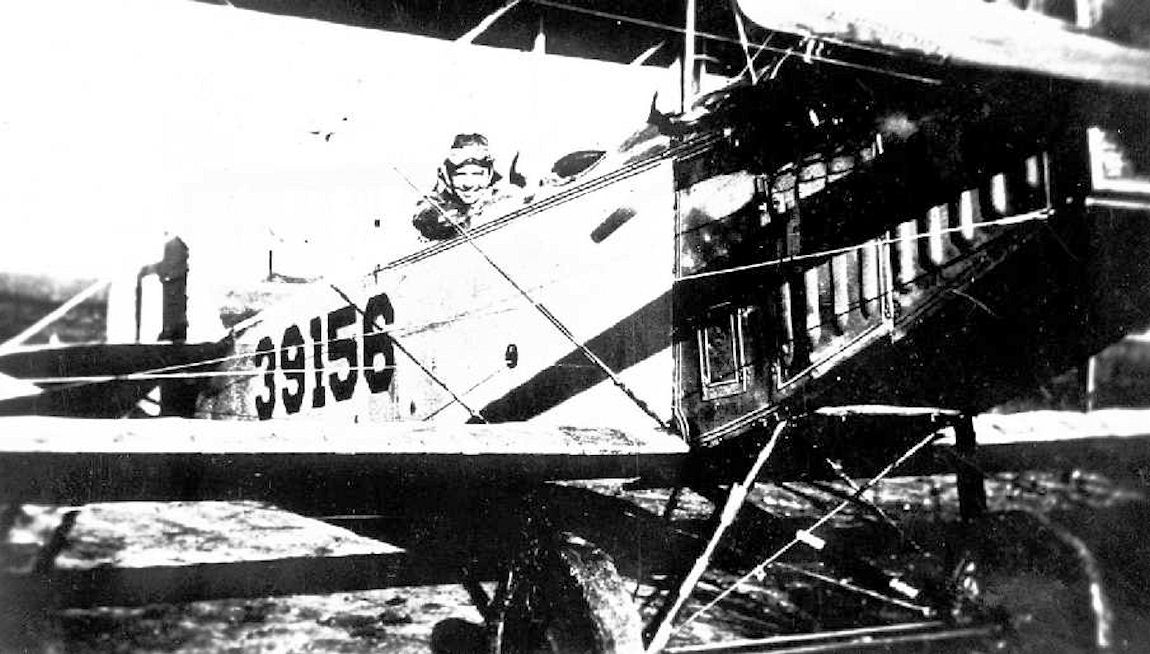
Curtiss JN-4 Jenny trainer at Hicks Field in 1918

Hicks Field (Camp Taliaferro Field #1) is a former World War I military airfield, located 5.6 miles (9.0 km) north-northwest of Saginaw, Texas. It operated as a training field for the Air Service, United States Army, from 1917 until 1920. It was one of 32 Air Service training camps established after the United States' entry into World War I in April 1917.

After the United States' entry into the war, General John J. Pershing invited the British Royal Flying Corps to establish training fields for the training of American and Canadians volunteers in Texas because of its mild weather. After looking at sites in Dallas, Fort Worth, Waco, Austin, Wichita Falls, and Midland, three sites were established in 1917 in the Fort Worth vicinity (known as the "Flying Triangle".), those being Hicks Field (#1), Barron Field (#2), and Benbrook Field (#3).

Canadians named the training complex Camp Taliaferro after Walter Taliaferro, a US aviator who had been killed in an accident. Camp Taliaferro was headquartered under the direction of the Air Service, United States Army, which had an administration center near what is now the Will Rogers Memorial Center in Fort Worth.

After the closing of Hicks Field, a new airport, called Hicks Airfield, opened.

== History ==
Taliafero Field No. 1 was used by the Royal Flying Corps from October 1917 to April 1918 as a training field for American and Canadian pilots. It was then turned over to the Air Service, United States Army. The Americans renamed the field Hicks Field, after Charles Hicks, who owned the Hicks Ranch on which the airfield was built.

=== World War I ===
The first trainees arrived in November 1917 to a very crude facility. Most structures were unfinished, and personnel lived and worked in canvas tents. The flu epidemic killed many assigned personnel. The airfield was taken over by United States Army in April 1918. The Curtiss JN-4 "Jenny" became the primary aircraft used for flight training after the Army takeover.

Training units assigned to Hicks Field were:

- Post Headquarters, Hicks Field – October 1919
- 78th Aero Squadron, February 1918

Redesignated as Squadron "A", July–November 1918

- 79th Aero Squadron, February 1918

Redesignated as Squadron "B", July–November 1918

- 82d Aero Squadron, March 1918

Redesignated as Squadron "C", July–November 1918

- 206th Aero Squadron, April 1918

Redesignated as Squadron "D", July–November 1918

- 275th Aero Squadron, February 1918

Redesignated as Squadron "E", July–November 1918

- Flying School Detachment (Consolidation of Squadrons A-E), November 1918 – November 1919

The 22d, 27th, 28th, 139th, 147th, and 148th US Aero Squadrons trained at the facility. Military use ended in early 1919 after the end of World War I.

In 1923, the field became the location of the world's first helium plant, operated by United States Navy. It became a Navy blimp facility until 1929, when shortages closed facility. (The helium plant was located in Fort Worth at what is now Meacham Blvd and Blue Mound Road. It was never located at the airfield. J Hodgson, Fort Worth Aviation Museum)

=== World War II ===
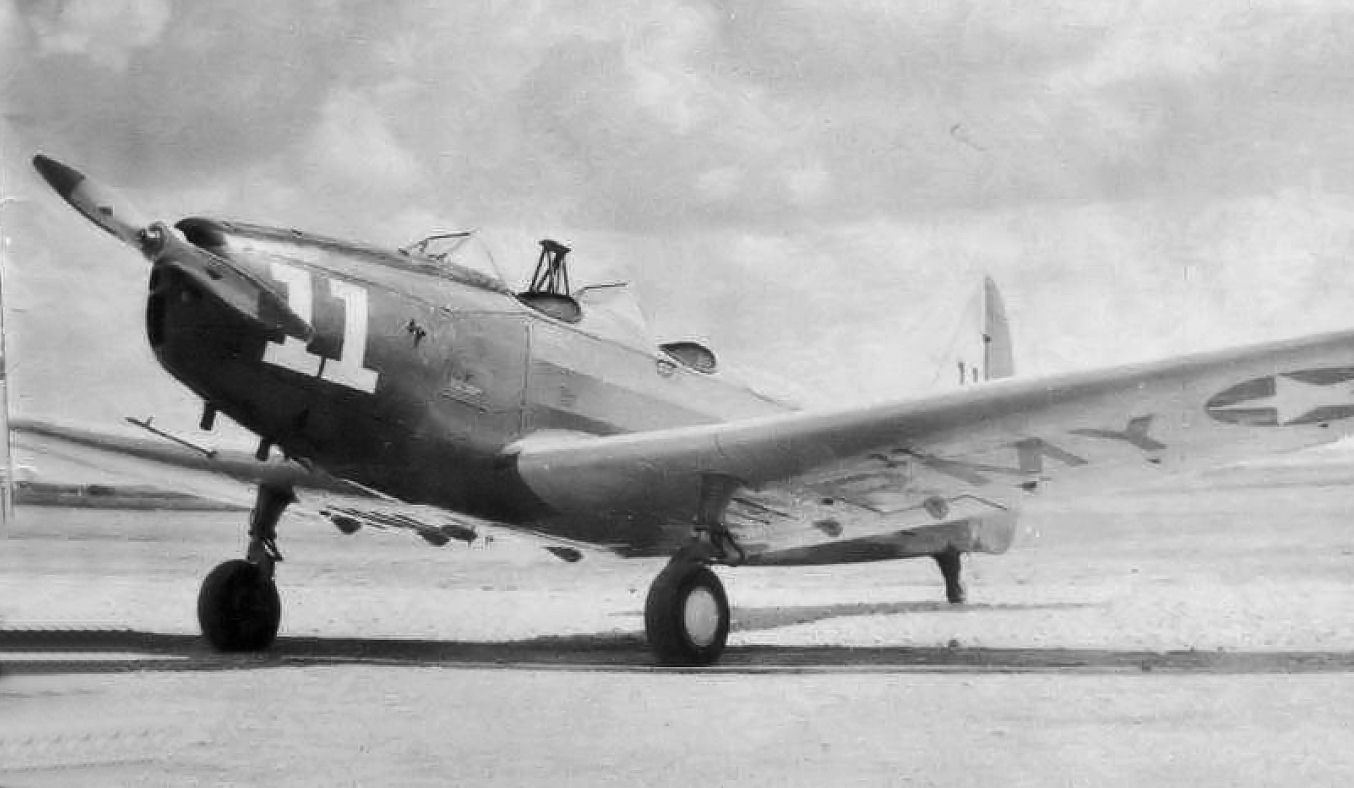
During World War II, Hicks Field was equipped with Fairchild PT-19 trainers by the Army Air Forces

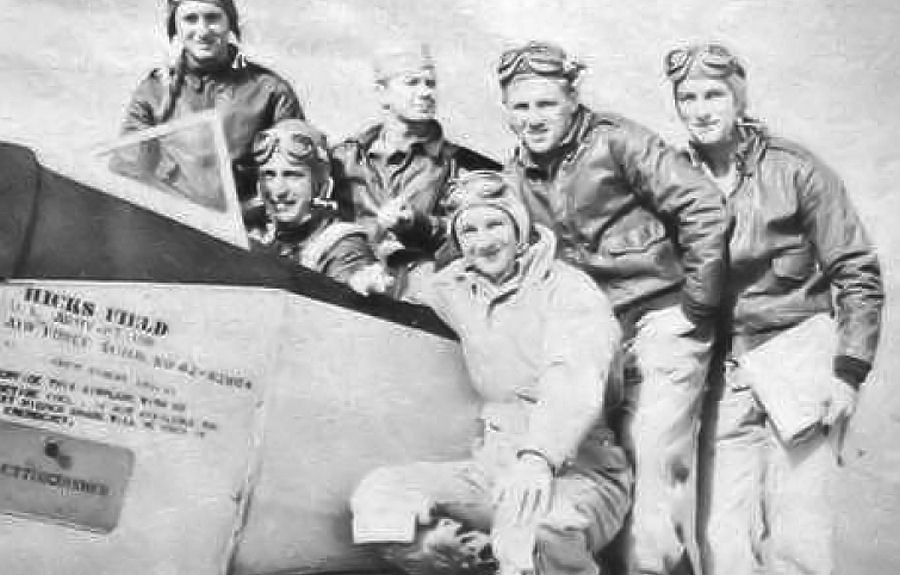
Aviation Cadets with Flight Instructor for Level 1 Primary flight training at Hicks Field, 1943

In preparation for the eventual U.S. entry into World War II, the United States Army Air Corps sought to expand the nation's combat air forces by asking civilian flight schools to provide the primary phase of training for air cadets. Consequently, it contracted with civilian flying schools to provide primary flying training, with the graduates being moved on to basic and advanced training at regular military training airfields.

Taken over by United States Army Air Corps in 1940, Hicks Field was reopened and its facilities improved. It was used as a contract primary flight training facility by the USAAF Gulf Coast Training Center (later Central Flying Command). The Texas Aviation School and the W. F. Long Flying School provided flying training to aviation cadets. Initially under supervision of 307th Army Air Forces Flying Training Detachment, later redesignated as 2555th Army Air Forces Base Unit (Contract Pilot School, Primary) on 1 May 1944. A 10-week course of primary training continued at Hicks, 2,403 cadets were processed, and about 70% made it to the next level of training at Randolph Field.

Flying training was performed with Fairchild PT-19s as the primary trainer. Also, the school had several PT-17 Stearmans, and a few P-40 Warhawks were assigned. The field was inactivated 20 July 1944 with the drawdown of AAFTC's pilot-training program, declared surplus, and turned over to the Army Corps of Engineers. It was eventually discharged to the War Assets Administration and returned to civilian control.

=== Civil use ===
Hicks Field was converted to a civilian airport by April 1945. In 1954, Hicks was used by Bell Helicopter for flight testing of the HSL antisubmarine warfare helicopter.

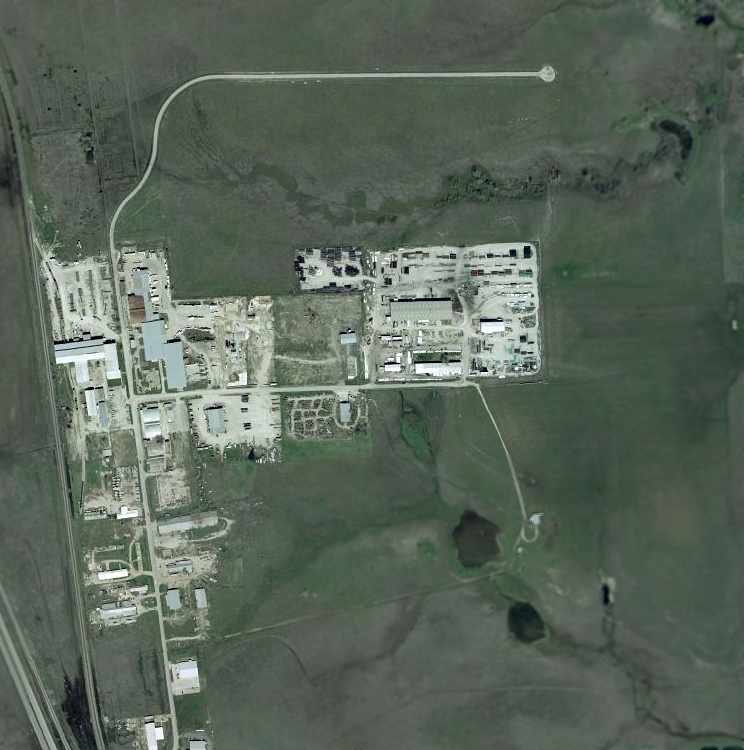
2001 USGS aerial photo of the former Hicks Field facility

Hicks fell into disuse by 1976, having been removed from maps, and with only a few businesses remaining. In 1985, the similarly named but unrelated Hicks Airfield opened a short distance away. The original airfield was redeveloped into an industrial park by the early 1990s, although a few World War II-era hangars still stood.

== See also ==
- United States Army World War I Flight Training
- Texas World War II Army Airfields
- 31st Flying Training Wing (World War II)
