= Dodd Field =

Dodd Army Airfield
- Part of I Troop Carrier Command
- San Antonio, Texas, USA
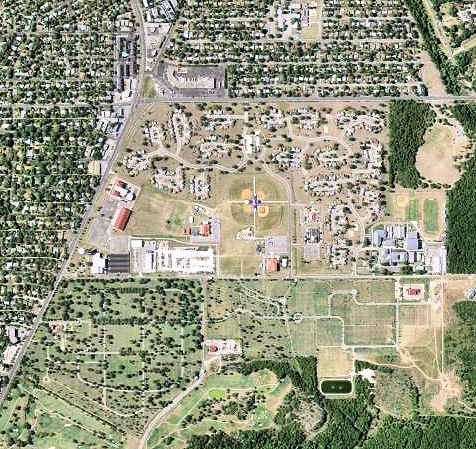
- Aerial photo of Dodd Army Airfield - 2006

Site information
- Type: Military Airfield
- Controlled by: United States Air Force

Location
- Coordinates: 29°28′48″N 098°25′48″W

Site history
- Built: 1911
- In use: 1911–1945

Garrison information
- Garrison: I Troop Carrier Command

Dodd Army Airfield was an airfield located within the current boundaries of Fort Sam Houston in San Antonio, Texas. Dodd Field includes the area bounded on the north by Rittiman Road, on the west by Harry Wurzbach Memorial Highway, on the south by Winans (formerly Dashiell) Road and on the east by the Fort Sam Houston Reservation boundary.

== History ==
Known originally as Remount Station #1, the area was used as a U.S. Army Remount Service depot which supported the cavalry troops assigned to Fort Sam Houston. Aviation started at Dodd Field about 1915, and continued through the early years of World War II. Most of the first aircraft assigned to the Army were based here with the 1st Aero Squadron when it transferred from Fort Sill, Oklahoma, in 1915. The squadron deployed in support of the 1916–1917 Punitive Expedition into Mexico from the Remount Station. On 1 November 1916, the 3d Aero Squadron activated there and flew the Curtiss JN-4. The 3d departed the Remount on 5 April 1917 to establish a new airfield to the southwest of San Antonio. This new field became Kelly Field by the summer of 1917. During World War I, the aerodrome served as a supply depot.

Aviation returned to the airfield in June 1925, when the 12th Observation Squadron transferred there to support the 2d Division. On 10 May 1928, the field was designated Dodd Field in War Department General Order Number 5. It was named in honor of Colonel Townsend Foster Dodd, Air Service, who was killed in an aircraft accident on October 5, 1919 at Bustleton Field near Philadelphia. At the time, he was serving as Commander of Langley Field, Virginia. The 12th remained at Dodd until 31 October 1931 when the squadron transferred to Brooks Field, south of San Antonio. In the 1930s, the Coast Guard briefly used Dodd for air support, and Kelly used the field to train bombardiers.

During World War II, the 63d Troop Carrier Group based C-47 Skytrain transport aircraft at Dodd Army Airfield from September though November 1942. The departure of the 63d ended flying operations at Dodd. In 1943, a prisoner of war camp was established there, and it held Axis POWs until 1946.

In 1949, Dodd was converted into a government housing area for Army personnel stationed at Ft. Sam Houston. The area eventually was absorbed into Fort Sam Houston.

== See also ==
- Texas World War II Army Airfields
