= Camp Taliaferro =

Former US Army Air Service post in Texas

- Fort Worth, Texas
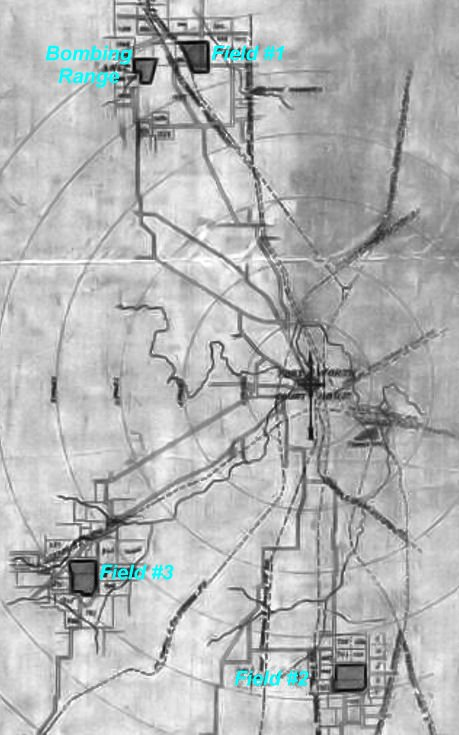
- Locations of the Camp Taliaferro training fields around Fort Worth, Texas

Site information
- Type: Pilot training complex
- Controlled by: Royal Flying Corps (1917); Air Service, United States Army (1918–1919)

Location
- Coordinates: 32°54′44″N 97°24′05″W; Hicks Field #1; 32°40′41″N 97°27′36″W; Benbrook Field #2; 32°37′26″N 97°18′24″W; Barron Field #3

Site history
- Built: 1918
- In use: 1918–1921
- Battles/wars: World War I

Garrison information
- Garrison: Training Section, Air Service

Camp Taliaferro was a World War I flight-training center run under the direction of the Air Service, United States Army in the Fort Worth, Texas, area. Camp Taliaferro had an administration center near what is now the Will Rogers Memorial Center complex in Fort Worth's cultural area near University Drive and W Lancaster Avenue.

== History ==
After the United States' entry into World War I in April 1917, General John J. "Blackjack" Pershing invited the British Royal Flying Corps (RFC) to establish training fields in the Southern United States, where the warmer weather would be more conducive for flying year-round. In June, the War Department inspected six sites around Fort Worth, which had been offered by the Chamber of Commerce. By July, RFC representatives from Canada inspected five potential sites in Texas and Louisiana for use during the winter.

After looking at sites in Dallas, Fort Worth, Waco, Austin, Wichita Falls, and Midland, the War Department signed leases in August with the RFC on three sites around Fort Worth. Known as the Flying Triangle, these sites were Hicks Field, Barron Field, and Benbrook Field based on their locations, and construction began in late August and early September.

The Canadians named the training complex Camp Taliaferro after First Lieutenant Walter R. Taliaferro, a U.S. Army aviator. Taliaferro was killed in an accident at [San Diego], California, on 11 October 1915. The Camp Taliaferro offices for the Air Service and RFC Canada were initially located in the basement of the Chamber of Commerce building in Fort Worth to handle pay, purchasing, and administrative services for their own personnel assigned at the three fields.

US Air Service squadrons, which had been training in Canada, began arriving in October 1917, and the RFC squadrons began to arrive in early November.

RFC instructors trained about 6000 men there. In six months, 1,960 pilots were trained, completing 67,000 flying hours on the Curtiss JN4 Canuck, a two-seater biplane weighing 2,100 lb (950 kg) with a maximum speed of 75 mph (120 km/h). About 69 ground officers and 4,150 others received training in ground trades and skills. During the winter, eight deaths were due to influenza and 39 RFC personnel died as the result of aircraft accidents, influenza, or other illnesses.

Canadian cadets were at Benbrook and Everman Fields, while the US cadets and the Canadian aerial gunnery school went to Hicks. The training was a major life experience, sufficiently so for veterans to keep memorabilia long afterwards. For example, the wife of Harry Kuhlmann from San Jose, California, (22d Aero Squadron 1917-9) died in 1974, still holding Camp Taliaferro post exchange tickets. In Cornell's Alumni News, L. H. Germer announced as his permanent address: Squadron 139, Field No. 1, Camp Taliaferro, Hicks, Texas. At Christmas, special postcards were available from the camp for residents.

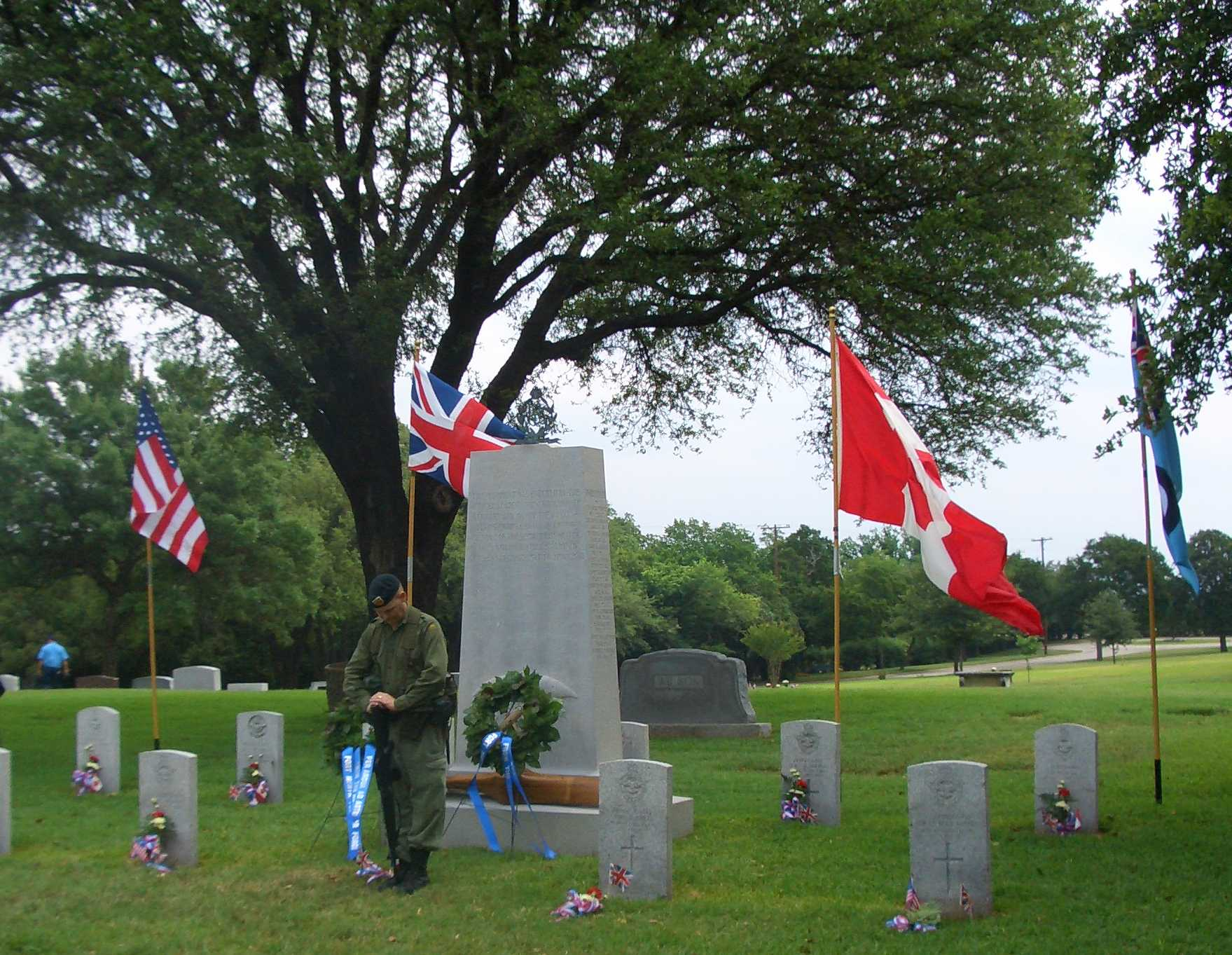
A guard at the Fort Worth war graves cemetery, Memorial Day 2005, Greenwood Cemetery, Fort Worth, Texas

For those who survived the training, combat life expectancy was short. Only two US Air Service squadrons—the 17th and 148th Aero Squadrons—saw active service with the British, flying with them until November 1918, after which they were absorbed into the US Air Service. The obituary of one veteran may be typical:

ELLIOTT, Edward William. 1st Lieutenant. Son of Samuel A. and Myrtle Elliott; born September 9, 1895, Wapakoneta, OH. Living in Muncie, IN when he entered First Officers Training Camp, Ft. Harrison, IN, May 15, 1917. Commissioned 1st Lieutenant. Assigned to 27th Aero Squadron. Transferred to Toronto, Canada; then to Camp Taliaferro, TX. Overseas in March 1918. Killed in an air battle, Chateau-Thierry, France, July 2, 1918. Survived by widow, Reba Thorpe Elliott, Muncie, IN.

Others survived the war, but to continue in aviation was almost as perilous:

Edmund Pike Graves: born in Newburyport, Massachusetts, on March 13, 1891. Middlesex School, Class of 1907; Harvard, Class of 1913. Enlisted as a cadet, Royal Flying Corps in Canada on July 9, 1917 to avoid a delay in getting into a U.S. flying program. Commissioned 2nd Lieutenant, R.F.C. on October 29, 1917. Assigned as instructor in aerial gunnery at Camp Taliaferro, Hicks Field, Fort Worth, Texas. One of the first pilots to do elaborate stunts in a Curtiss. Transferred to Officers' School of Special Flying at Armour Heights, North Toronto in early spring, 1918. Promoted to 1st Lieutenant in May, 1918. Posted overseas, arrived on November 5, 1918 - armistice signed prior to movement to France. Demobilized in July, 1919. Volunteered for Kosciuszko Squadron flying for the new state of Poland and flew Albatross aircraft in patrols over the front in the Lemberg (Lwow) area. Killed during the celebration of the liberation of Lemberg from the Ukrainians when his aircraft lost its right wing during a double roll at 150 feet. Buried in Lemberg, with honors, by the Government of Poland.

Thirty-nine officers and cadets died in Texas. Eleven British, Canadians, and Americans remain there, reinterred in 1924 at a Commonwealth War Graves Commission cemetery plot in Greenwood Memorial Park, Fort Worth. The plot is in Section 5 of the cemetery, at 32-45-47, 97-21-48. Also interred there are one of their comrades who died in 1975, and the daughter of a Canadian instructor who died as a baby in 1918. A stone monument serves as a focal point on Memorial Day in May of odd-numbered years, when friends of the cemetery support a moving Remembrance Service, at which people from the three nations remember the sacrifice of those buried there.

Following the departure of the Royal Air Force in April 1918, Camp Taliaferro was closed and each of the three fields operated as separate sites. When the RFC Canada arrived in Fort Worth in November 1917, they brought 254 Curtiss JN-4 (Can) license-built aircraft with them for training at these fields around Fort Worth. When they returned to Canada in April 1918, they turned over 180 serviceable aircraft to the Army Air Service. By then, American and Canadian license-built JN-4s were keeping up with demand.

== See also ==
- List of Training Section Air Service airfields
