= Hicks Airfield =

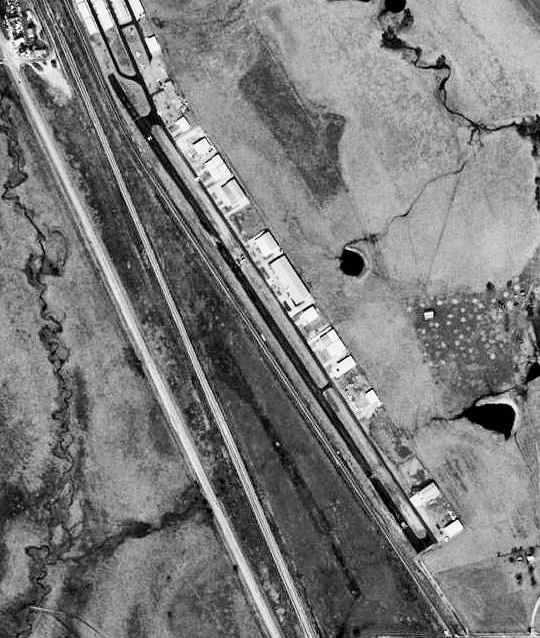
- IATA: none; ICAO: none; FAA LID: T67

Summary
- Airport type: Private
- Owner: Hicks Airfield Pilots Assn.
- Serves: Fort Worth, Texas
- Location: Tarrant County
- Elevation AMSL: 855 ft (261 m)
- Coordinates: 32°54′44″N 097°24′04″W
- Website: https://www.t67.org/
- Interactive map of Hicks Airfield

Runways
Direction	Length		Surface
Direction	ft	m	Surface
14/32	3,740	1,140	Asphalt

Statistics (2009)
- Aircraft operations: 31,000
- Based aircraft: 327
- Source: Federal Aviation Administration

Hicks Airfield (FAA LID: T67) is a private use airport located 14 nautical miles (16 mi; 26 km) northwest of the central business district of Fort Worth, in Tarrant County, Texas, United States. The airport is used solely for general aviation purposes.

== History ==
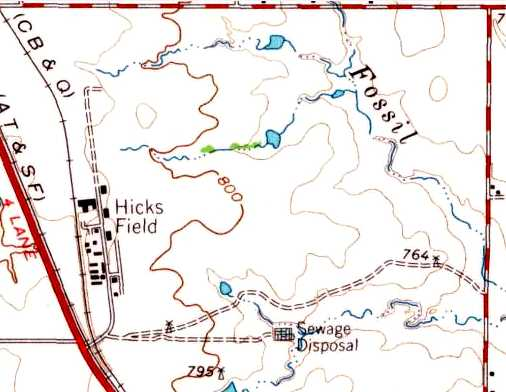
The 1955 USGS map of the original Hicks Field, southeast of the present-day airfield

The present Hicks Airfield opened in 1985. It is located near the former site of the unrelated Hicks Field, a military training field used in World War I and World War II. The original Hicks Field was converted to civil ownership by April 1945 but it fell into disuse by 1976; it was redeveloped into an industrial park by the early 1990s, although a few World War II-era hangars still stood.

== Facilities and aircraft ==
Hicks Airfield covers an area of 77 acres (31 ha) at an elevation of 855 feet (261 m) above mean sea level. It has one runway designated 14/32 with an asphalt surface measuring 3,740 by 60 feet (1,140 by 18 m).

For the 12-month period ending March 7, 2009, the airport had 31,000 general aviation aircraft operations, an average of 84 per day. At that time there were 327 aircraft based at this airport: 92% single-engine, 6% multi-engine, 1% helicopter and 1% ultralight.

== Accidents and incidents ==
- 20 July 2005: A Mooney M20J, registration number N5670M, executed a series of "erratic" maneuvers culminating in a "knife-edge drop" while flying near the airport; the aircraft then leveled off at very low altitude and maneuvered to miss two nearby houses before crashing in the yard between them. The crash and post-crash fire killed the pilot and both passengers, destroyed the aircraft, and caused minor injuries to a person on the ground. National Transportation Safety Board (NTSB) investigators were unable to conclusively determine the cause of the crash.
- 26 December 2005: A Boeing A75N1 biplane, registration number N67195, lost engine power during a steep climb to reenter the airfield traffic pattern after a touch-and-go landing; the aircraft spun and crashed southeast of the departure end of Runway 14. The aircraft was substantially damaged, the pilot was seriously injured, and the single passenger was killed. The accident was attributed to "The pilot's failure to maintain airspeed, which resulted in an inadvertent stall/spin. Contributing factors were the reported loss of engine power for undetermined reasons and the low altitude maneuver."

== See also ==
- List of airports in Texas
