= William L. Kenly =

United States Army general (1864–1928)

William Lacy Kenly
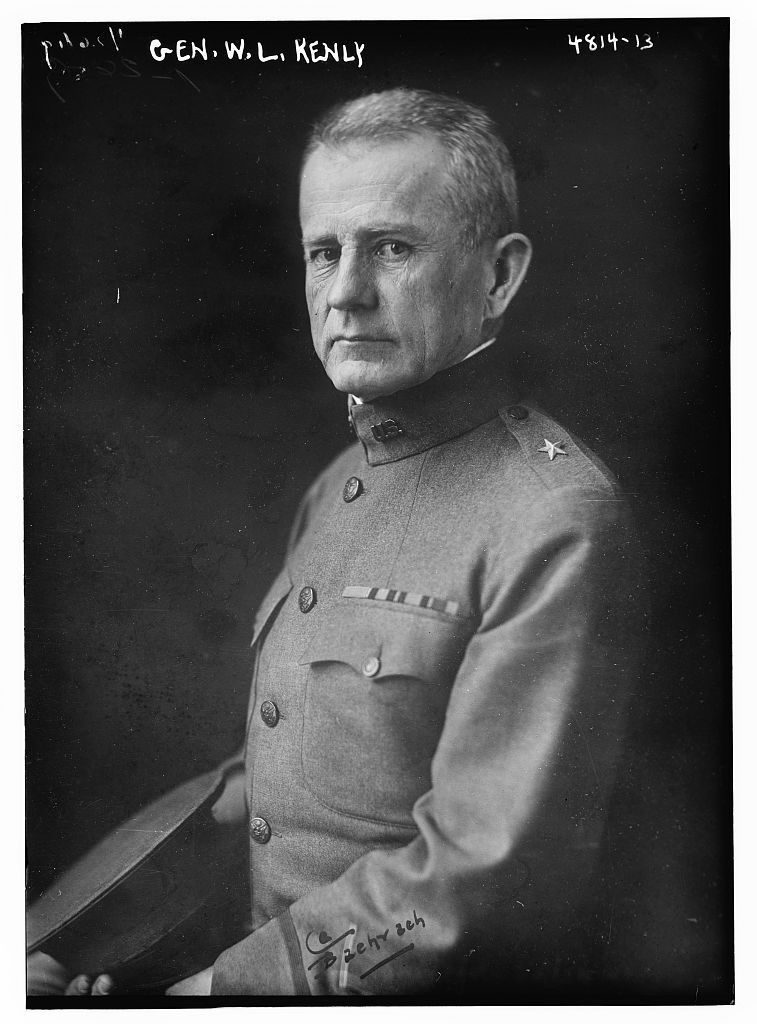
- Kenly, c. 1918
- Born: February 18, 1864; Baltimore, Maryland, U.S.
- Died: January 10, 1928 (aged 63); Washington, D.C., U.S.
- Military career
- Allegiance: United States
- Branch: United States Army
- Service years: 1889–1919
- Rank: Major general
- Conflicts: World War I
- Awards: Army Distinguished Service Medal; Silver Star (2)

William Lacy Kenly (February 18, 1864 – January 10, 1928) was a major general in the United States Army. During World War I, he was a leader of the United States Army Air Service, the progenitor of the United States Air Force.

== Early life ==
William L. Kenly was born on February 18, 1864, in Baltimore, Maryland, the son of Major William L. Kenly and Marion Hook. His father participated in the American Civil War (but is not to be confused with the General Kenly of that war). His immigrant ancestor was his great great grandfather Rev. Daniel Kenly who emigrated from Scotland to Maryland in the 1700s. Kenly was married to Julie Closson, the daughter of Brigadier General Henry W. Closson.

== Military career ==
He was a graduate, 11th in a class of 49, of the United States Military Academy at West Point, 12 June 1889, in field artillery and took part on August 16, 1899, in the Battle of Angeles, in the Pampanga Province during the Philippine–American War.

On September 3, 1917, Brigadier General Kenly became the first Chief of Air Service of the American Expeditionary Force (AEF) in France, effectively taking control away from the Aviation Section, U.S. Signal Corps. Previously a field artillery commander, he did not have experience leading an air force, and General Billy Mitchell wielded a large amount of influence in the AEF's operational decisions. Kenly was replaced a short time later by Brig. Gen. Benjamin Foulois.

Kenly then returned to the United States to become Director of Military Aeronautics from May 20, 1918, to August 28, 1918. During this period, he was the titular head of the newly established United States Army Air Service. He retired in 1919 and King George of Great Britain awarded Kenly the honor of Companion of the Order of the Bath.

== Death ==
Kenly died of a heart attack on January 10, 1928, in Washington, D.C. He was buried at Arlington National Cemetery in Virginia. He was survived by his wife, Mrs. Julie Kenly, and two sons, including Thomas Kenly, founder of Camp Quinebarge in Moultonborough, NH.

Military offices
New title Post established	Chief of Air Service, AEF; September 3 – November 27, 1917	Succeeded by Benjamin Foulois
