= Division of Military Aeronautics =

US Air Force precursor

The Division of Military Aeronautics was the name of the aviation organization of the United States Army for a four-day period during World War I. It was created by a reorganization by the War Department of the Aviation Section, U.S. Signal Corps on April 24, 1918, still as part of the Signal Corps. It was removed from the Aviation Section by executive order on May 20, 1918, and existed as the sole Army aviation agency until a War Department general order issued May 24, 1918, established it and the Bureau of Aircraft Production, created by the same reorganization on April 24, as coordinate components of the "Air Service". As such, it is recognized by the United States Air Force as the third of its antecedents.

As a subordinate component of the Air Service, the DMA continued until March 19, 1919, when the Board of Aircraft Production was consolidated with it into the Air Service, United States Army.

== History of the DMA ==
=== Creation ===
The failure of the Aircraft Production Board (after October 1, 1917, the Aircraft Board) and the Aviation Section, U.S. Signal Corps to meet aircraft production goals for the establishment of an adequate air combat force in France by the summer of 1918 forced the administration of President Woodrow Wilson to overhaul the bureaucratic structure of military aviation. In –addition the Aircraft Board was being investigated by both the Justice Department and the United States Senate for possible fraud. For similar reasons, the Division of Military Aeronautics was created on April 24, 1918, replacing the Air Division, which had been the final designation of the original Aeronautical Division, U.S. Signal Corps.

On May 20, 1918, by Executive Order 2862, issued under authority of the Overman Act signed into law that date, the Division of Military Aeronautics was removed from the Aviation Section of the Signal Corps for the duration of the war and six months thereafter. The administration, training, aircraft requirements, personnel, and facilities of Army aviation became the responsibility of the DMA, headed by the Director of Military Aeronautics, reporting directly to the secretary of war, Newton Baker. The existing Aircraft Board was replaced at the same time by a Bureau of Aircraft Production (BAP), headed by a civilian director, John D. Ryan, formerly president of Anaconda Copper, who had been appointed Director of Aircraft Production on April 24.

=== Consolidation into the Air Service ===
Four days later War Department General Order 51 implemented the executive order, specifying the duties and responsibilities of both the DMA and BAP, in effect creating the Air Service, United States Army. From May 24, 1918, to March 19, 1919, the Division of Military Aeronautics continued as a part of the nominal Air Service. Although it recognized that both the DMA and BAP together formed its Air Service, the War Department determined that no Director of Air Service would be appointed as long as the BAP was a separate executive bureau. The Director of Military Aeronautics thus also acted as titular head of the Air Service except in matters of aircraft production, a major shortcoming in authority.

In August, the Senate completed its investigation of the Aircraft Board, and while it found no criminal culpability, it reported that massive waste and delay in production had occurred. Ryan, the Director of Aircraft Production (who had also been chairman of the Aircraft Board), was appointed to the vacant position of Second Assistant Secretary of War and by War Department General Orders No. 81, designated as Director of Air Service on August 28. The separate status of both the Division of Military Aeronautics and the Bureau of Aircraft Production technically ended, but Ryan allowed them to continue to operate separately, reporting to him, and were not officially terminated until an executive order was issued on March 19, 1919.

The first Director of Military Aeronautics was Major General William L. Kenly. His executive officer was Colonel Henry H. Arnold, who had also held the same position in the former Aviation Section. On March 6, 1919, Kenly reverted to his permanent rank of Colonel, Field Artillery, and Brig. Gen. Billy Mitchell was named to replace him as Director of Military Aeronautics. Mitchell became Director on March 10, but nine days later Executive Order 3066 by President Wilson consolidated the Board of Aircraft Production and the DMA into the Air Service under a Chief of Air Service, leaving the position titular only. Mitchell retained the title until the Training and Operations Group came into being. Initially Menoher's "Third Assistant Executive", as chief of the Training and Operations Group he was able to expound his airpower theories.

== Lineage of the United States Air Force ==
- Aeronautical Division, Signal Corps: August 1, 1907 – July 18, 1914
- Aviation Section, Signal Corps: July 18, 1914 – May 20, 1918
- Division of Military Aeronautics: May 20, 1918 – May 24, 1918
- Air Service, United States Army: May 24, 1918 – July 2, 1926
- United States Army Air Corps: July 2, 1926 – June 20, 1941
- United States Army Air Forces: June 20, 1941 – September 18, 1947
- United States Air Force September 18, 1947–present

== Sources ==
- Mortenson, Daniel R., "The Air Service in the Great War," Winged Shield, Winged Sword: A History of the United States Air Force Vol. I (1997), ISBN 0-16-049009-X
- "2005 Almanac," Air Force Magazine, May 2005, Vol. 88, No. 5, the Air Force Association, Arlington, Virginia

Preceded by Aviation Section, Signal Corps	Division of Military Aeronautics; 1918	Succeeded by United States Army Air Service
