= Walter R. Taliaferro =

American aviator

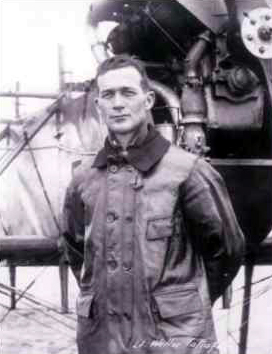
Walter R. Taliaferro (1880–1915)

Walter Robertson Taliaferro (September 9, 1880 – October 11, 1915) was a pioneer aviator in the U.S. Army who died in a flying accident. After his first and last "loop the loop" in a Curtiss tractor biplane, the plane suddenly dove into San Diego Bay, killing him instantly.

== Biography ==
Taliaferro was born on September 9, 1880, in Campbell County, Kentucky. He served as an enlisted man in the artillery for seven years before being commissioned as an officer in the 21st infantry in 1908. He did surveying work in the Philippine Islands and in 1913 was detailed to the Aeronautical Division, U.S. Signal Corps, for pilot training.

Taliaferro was married to Leicester Sehon (1894-1918), the daughter of San Diego mayor John L. Sehon. He died on October 11, 1915, in San Diego. He was buried in San Diego at the Mount Hope Cemetery.

Camp Taliaferro in Texas was named in his honor, as was Camp Taliaferro in San Diego.

== Records ==
Taliaferro made an aviation distance record, flying 220 miles in about 3.5 hours. With Lieutenant Joseph E. Carberry, he set a new American altitude record for a plane carrying two persons of about 7,000 feet, although it was only a month until Carberry and another reached 11,690 feet. Taliaferro also achieved a flight endurance record in September 1915 of 9 hours and 45 minutes, before he ran out of fuel.
