= Lewis E. Goodier =

Lewis E. Goodier may refer to:

- Lewis Edward Goodier Sr. (1857–1935), United States Army judge
- Lewis E. Goodier Jr. (1885–1961), his son, pioneer aviator, United States Army and later United States Air Force officer
