= Paul L. Williams (general) =

United States Air Force general

- Major General Paul L. Williams
- Born: April 16, 1894; Detroit, Michigan
- Died: March 3, 1968 (aged 73)
- Military career
- Allegiance: United States of America
- Branch: United States Army; United States Air Force
- Service years: 1917–1950
- Rank: Major General
- Commands: Tenth Air Force; Second Air Force; Ninth Air Force; Third Air Force; IX Troop Carrier Command; 51st Troop Carrier Wing; XII Air Support Command; 27th Bombardment Group; 3rd Bombardment Group; 90th Attack Squadron
- Conflicts: World War II: Operation Torch; Tunisia Campaign; Allied invasion of Sicily; Allied invasion of Italy; Operation Overlord; Operation Dragoon; Operation Market Garden; Operation Varsity
- Awards: Distinguished Service Medal; Legion of Merit; Distinguished Flying Cross (2); Air Medal; Légion d'honneur (France); Knight Commander of the Order of the Bath (UK)

Paul Langdon Williams (16 April 1894 – 3 March 1968) was a United States Army Air Forces and United States Air Force general. As head of the IX Troop Carrier Command during World War II, he was responsible for the airlift of the airborne landings in North Africa, Sicily, Italy, Normandy, southern France, the Netherlands and Germany.

== Early life ==
Paul Langdon Williams was born in Detroit, Michigan on 16 April 1894 but his family moved to Los Angeles when he was still a boy. He graduated Stanford University in 1917 with a Bachelor of Arts degree.

== World War I ==
Williams was commissioned as a 2nd Lieutenant in the Infantry Reserve on 28 April 1917. On 20 October he enlisted as a private first class in the aviation cadet in the Aviation Section, Signal Enlisted Reserve Corps. On graduation from flight training on 19 February 1918 he was commissioned as a 2nd Lieutenant in the Aviation Section, Signal Reserve. In April 1918 he was posted to Carlstrom Field near Arcadia, Florida. In December 1918 he moved to Gerstner Field, Louisiana, and then, in November 1919, to Calexico, California, for border patrol duty with the 9th Aero Squadron. From December 1919 to December 1920 he served with it at Rockwell Field and Mather Field in California.

== Between the wars ==
Williams received a regular commission as a 2nd lieutenant in the United States Army Air Service on 1 July 1920, and was promoted to 1st lieutenant the same day. He became post transportation officer at Mather Field in January 1921. In July 1921 was posted to Clark Field at Fort Stotsenburg in the Philippine Islands with the 3rd Pursuit Squadron. In September 1925 he was transferred to Kindley Field, Philippine Islands, where he joined the 2nd Observation Squadron, serving in post and squadron staff duties. Returning to the United States, he became operations officer for the 96th Bombardment Squadron at Langley Field. Williams served at the Air Corps Primary Flying School at Brooks Field, Texas, from June to October 1927. He qualified as a flying instructor at the primary flying school at March Field in 1930. Williams was Director of Flying at March Field from July 1930 to October 1931, when he became Director of Basic Flying Training at Randolph Field. He was promoted to captain on 1 March 1931 and temporary major on 16 March 1935. He became Director of Flying Training at Randolph Field in September 1935. From August 1936 to June 1937 he attended the Air Corps Tactical School. He then became commander of the 90th Attack Squadron at Barksdale Field, Louisiana.

== World War II ==
In September 1940, Williams became Operations Officer of the 3rd Bombardment Group (Light), of which the 90th Bombardment Squadron was a part. He became its commander in December 1940, and was promoted to lieutenant colonel. In July 1941, he became commander of the 27th Bombardment Group. He was promoted to colonel on 5 January 1942. From May to November 1942 Williams was involved with the organisation of the Eighth Air Force in the United Kingdom.

=== North Africa ===
When the use of paratroops was contemplated for Operation Torch, Williams was given the task of organizing and commanding the 51st Troop Carrier Wing. The headquarters of the 51st Troop Carrier Wing arrived in Scotland on 1 September 1942 and was assigned to the Eighth Air Force. Williams was given all three of the troop carrier groups in the theater: the 60th Troop Carrier Group, the 62nd Troop Carrier Group and the 64th Troop Carrier Group. None of them had their full complement of 52 C-47 aircraft and many of the personnel of their air and ground crews were fresh out of training schools. Nonetheless, they constituted the entire Allied troop carrier force in the North African Theater of Operations operating in support of US and British airborne operations in North Africa. Williams reached North Africa by air on 15 November 1942. On 28 November Williams personally led forty-forty aircraft of the 62nd and 64th Troop Carrier Groups carrying 530 paratroops of the British 2nd Parachute Battalion. The battalion commander, Lieutenant Colonel John Dutton Frost rode with Williams in the lead aircraft. Williams picked his landmarks carefully and successfully navigated his way to Depienne Airfield, dropping the paratroops nearby. All his aircraft returned safely. Frost and his paratroops were not so lucky; half of them were killed or captured fighting their way back to Allied line.

On 21 January 1943, Williams became head of XII Air Support Command, the ground support aircraft operating in support of II Corps on the Tunisian front. Nominally the XII Air Support Command had a strength of 52 P-40s, 23 P-39s, 27 A-20s and eight DB-7s. Williams' assumption of command coincided with an increase in German activity. Reacting to a concentration of German armor around Faïd, Williams' aircraft bombed and strafed it all day on 26 January, claiming twelve German tanks destroyed. However, German opposition was increasing in the air as well. On 2 February, six P-40s and four P-39s encountered twenty to thirty Stukas escorted by eight to ten Bf 109s. A Stuka was shot down; but so were five P-40s. His most experienced group, the 33d Fighter Group took so many losses that it had to be withdrawn to Morocco to rebuild. Then reverses suffered by the ground forces in the Battle of the Kasserine Pass forced Williams to evacuate his forward airfields around Thélepte. Eighteen aircraft, of which five were irreparable, were destroyed to prevent their capture. On 22 and 23 February, Williams attempted to launch an all-out attack on German forces withdrawing through Kasserine Pass, but the weather hampered his efforts.

=== Sicily ===
Williams was promoted to brigadier general on 18 March 1943. After four hectic months with the XII Air Support Command, Williams returned to troops carriers as commander of the Northwest African Air Force Troop Carrier Command (Provisional). This had been created on 21 March 1943 to handle the airborne phase of Operation HUSKY, the Allied invasion of Sicily. In addition to the 51st Troop Carrier Wing, the Troop Carrier Command included the 52nd Troop Carrier Wing and No. 38 Wing, RAF. Getting this force ready for action was a major challenge. The 51st was assigned to work with the British and the 52nd with the Americans because the 51st had prior experience working with the British in North Africa, and its aircraft had been modified to work with British troops. However the British plan called for a glider infantry mission and the 51st had no experience with gliders, whereas the 52nd had conducted training with gliders before leaving the United States, but was committed to a parachute mission. Gliders were delivered disassembled and a major effort was required to assemble the required number of gliders. In the meantime, valuable training time was lost.

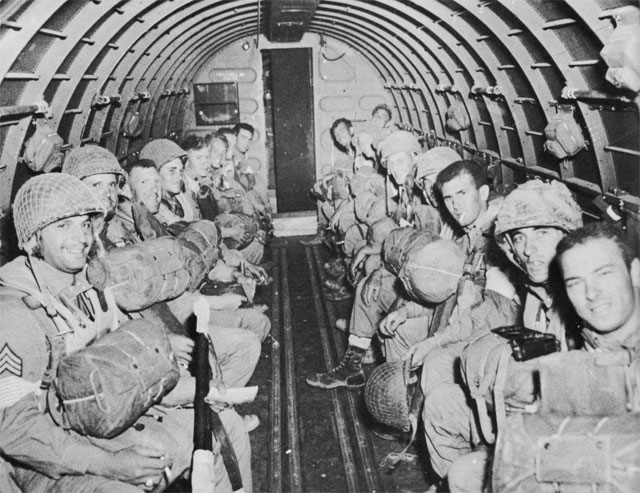
US paratroops bound for Sicily

Williams had not been involved with experiments that had been carried out by troop carriers over the previous months and was therefore not up to speed on the latest pathfinder equipment and tactics, which were neglected during the planning phase of HUSKY. Moreover, the route chosen for the 52nd Troop Carrier Wing's operation was particularly difficult, involving three sharp turns over water in dim moonlight. Williams was unable to secure the necessary agreement from the naval commander, Vice Admiral Henry Kent Hewitt for a straighter route. Nor was he able to persuade the Twelfth Air Force to provide a fighter escort for his troop carriers or to fly searchlight neutralisation missions, although the RAF agreed to fly some missions against searchlights. On 21 May, Williams moved his headquarters from Casablanca to Oujda in order to observe the progress of training of the 52nd Troop Carrier Wing and the 82nd Airborne Division. At least one of his group commanders felt that Williams was over-optimistic about the proficiency of his crews.

The British glider operation, codenamed Operation LADBROKE on the night of 9/10 July 1943 was poorly executed. The aircrew of the 51st Troop Carrier Wing had difficulty with navigation and formation flying at night. The aircraft were buffeted by high winds, subjected to flak which caused some aircraft to veer off course, and encountered poor visibility. No aircraft were lost but only 12 of the 133 gliders reached the landing zone, while 47 came down in the sea. The simultaneous American operation, which involved 226 C-47s of the 52nd Troop Carrier Wing carrying 2,781 paratroops, encountered similar problems, resulting in the drop being widely scattered. Less than one-sixth of the paratroops landing on or near the intended drop zone. The 82nd Airborne Division's commander, Major General Matthew Ridgway, felt that the operation had "demonstrated beyond any doubt that the Air Force... cannot at present put parachute units, even as large as a battalion within effective attack distance of a chosen drop zone at night."

The HUSKY mission on 11 July was far less successful. The 144 C-47s of the 52nd Troop Carrier Wing that took part had to fly at night over the front line. Moreover, Allied naval vessels had not been cleared from the approach corridor. The troop carriers came under heavy flak from friend and foe alike. Some 23 aircraft were lost and half of those that did return suffered damage. The paratroops of the 504th Parachute Infantry were widely scattered and suffered heavy casualties. A mission codenamed Operation FUSTIAN, flown on 13 July in support of the British, cost 11 C-47s destroyed and 50 damaged out of 124 participating. After the costly failures in Sicily, Lieutenant General Lesley J. McNair, the commander of Army Ground Forces, was prepared to break up the airborne divisions, but Williams retained his faith in the possibilities of airborne operations.

=== Italy ===
Because no British airborne operations were contemplated for the Allied Invasion of Italy, Williams directed both the 51st and 52nd Troop Carrier Wings to train with the 82nd Airborne Division. Taking the lessons of Sicily to heart, pathfinders were created. These were aircrew with the best available navigators carrying specially trained paratroops equipped with navigational aids. These included the British Rebecca/Eureka transponding radar and flashing Krypton lamps. The pathfinders' role was to locate and mark the drop zones for other airborne units. pathfinder training was conducted in Tunisia and encouraging results led to Williams' decision to employ Eureka in upcoming operations.

The Troop Carrier Command moved from Tunisia to Sicily in early September and Williams opened his headquarters at Licata. Two airborne operations were planned. GIANT I was an airborne assault on the Volturno River crossing. It was cancelled as the risks to both paratroops and aircraft were considered too great. GIANT II was an airborne assault on Rome area. Williams planned parachute drops on airfields at Poligono di Furbara and Cerveteri, northwest of the city. It too was cancelled amid doubts as to whether the Italian Rome garrison could hold the area. However, in response to the deteriorating situation in the Battle of Salerno, Lieutenant General Mark Clark called for an emergency mission to bring the 82nd Airborne Division. The 51st and 52nd Troop Carrier Wings were given only hours to prepare but Williams was able to improvise by using the plans for GIANT I. This time extraordinary measures were taken to silence Allied anti-aircraft guns afloat and ashore. Three pathfinder aircraft led the way, dropping fifty paratroops equipped with Rebecca/Eureka and Krypton lamps precisely on the drop zone behind Allied lines. Most of the paratroops landed within 200 yards (180 m) of the drop zone, and no troops or aircraft were lost. A second drop the following night was just as successful. This encouraged Allied commanders to attempt a battalion-sized drop behind enemy lines at Avellino the night after but the hilly terrain made it difficult for the pathfinders' Aldis lamps and radio transmitters and the drop was scattered.

=== Normandy ===
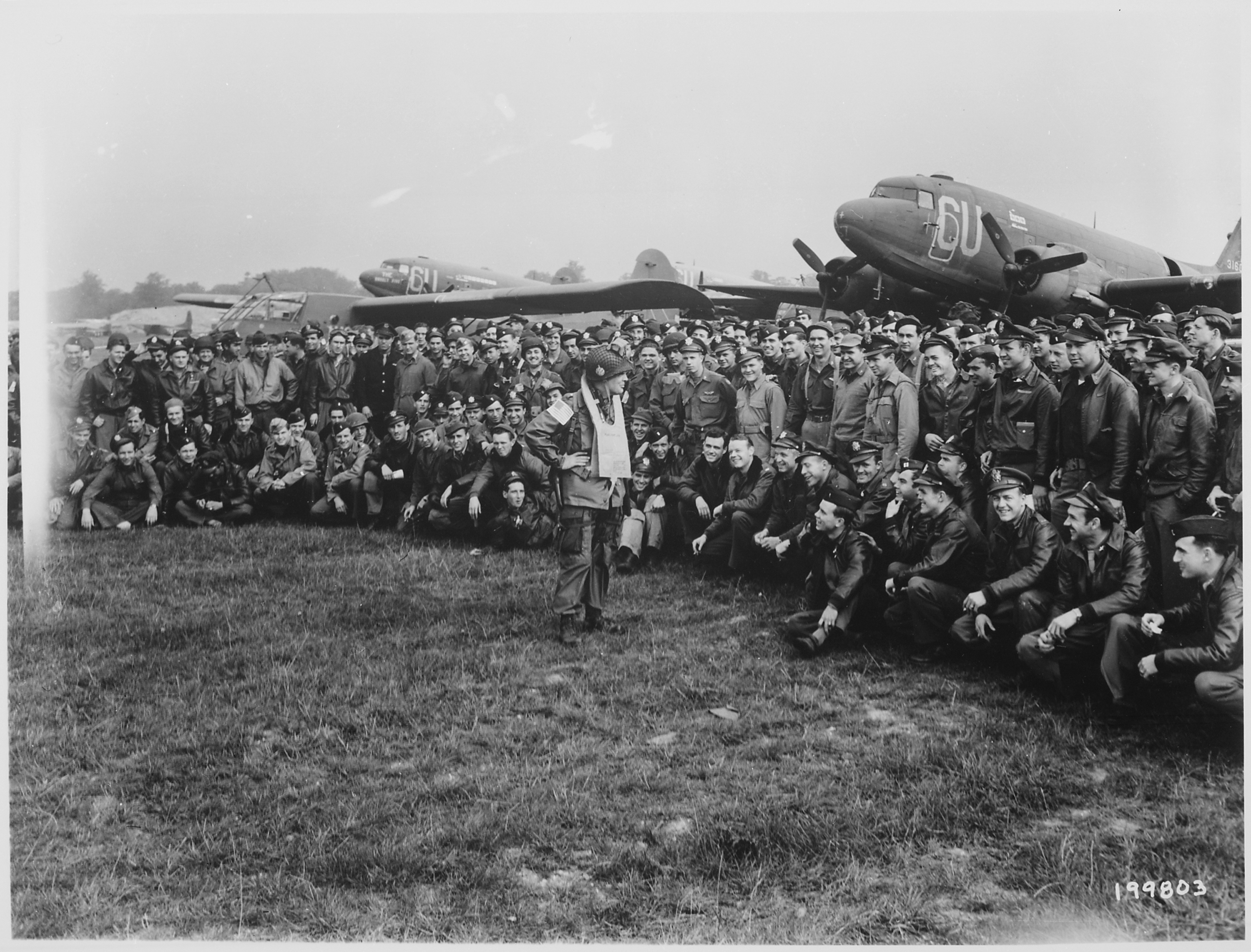
Brigadier General Anthony C. McAuliffe, artillery commander of the 101st Airborne Division, gives his various glider pilots last minute instructions before the take-off on D minus 1.

Planning for Operation OVERLORD, the invasion of Normandy, had begun years before and had included the prospect of airborne operations. To control them, Major General Lewis H. Brereton's Ninth Air Force activated the IX Troop Carrier Command in October 1943 under Brigadier General Benjamin F. Giles. However, even before Giles assumed command, it was understood that Williams would be in charge of the operations. He took over on 25 February 1944, bringing with him a number of experienced officers from the Mediterranean. When Giles assumed command, IX Troop Carrier Command consisted of the 50th Troop Carrier Wing, with the 315th and 434th Troop Carrier Groups. The 53rd Troop Carrier Wing arrived from the United States in February followed by the 52nd Troop Carrier Wing from Sicily in March. This brought the IX Troop Carrier Command's strength to three wings with fourteen groups. By the end of May, it had 1,116 crews and 1,207 operational aircraft. In addition, it had 1,118 operational Waco and 301 operational Horsa gliders.

Williams paired the 52nd Troop carrier Wing with the 82nd Airborne Division and the 53rd Troop Carrier Wing with the 101st Airborne Division. With so many inexperienced units and personnel, the IX Troop Carrier Command embarked on an intensive training regime as a matter of urgency. A Command Pathfinder School opened at Cottesmore on 26 February and one of Williams' first appointments was Lieutenant Colonel Joel L. Crouch as its commandant. A major command exercise called EAGLE was conducted on the night of 11 May. Except for some serious failures by the very inexperienced 315th and 442nd Troop Carrier Groups, the exercise went very well. Even Air Chief Marshal Sir Trafford Leigh-Mallory, the commander of the Allied Expeditionary Air Force, seemed impressed, although he later warned General Dwight Eisenhower that the American airborne operation was a potential disaster in the making. For Williams, who had already predicted that, barring pathfinder failure or heavy flak, over 90% of the paratroops would land in their correct drop zones in Normandy, the exercise affirmed his opinion. During the final days before the operation, Williams visited his groups, giving pep talks.

On D-Day and D+1, IX Troop Carrier Command flew 1,606 aircraft and 512 glider sorties. Losses of 41 aircraft and 9 gliders was lighter than expected, and Leigh-Mallory was quick to admit that he had been wrong. However, the drop was still scattered. Clouds and flak broke up the formations and fog made identification of the drop zones difficult, and in some areas the enemy prevented the pathfinders from marking the drop zones correctly. In all, some 13,348 paratroops had been embarked for Normandy, of whom 90 were brought back for various reasons and 18 were in a plane that ditched before reaching Normandy. Perhaps as many as 140 were killed when their planes were shot down. Of the rest, about 10% landed on the drop zone, 25-30% within a 1 mile (1.6 km) of their beacon, and 15-20% within 2 miles (3.2 km).

=== Southern France ===
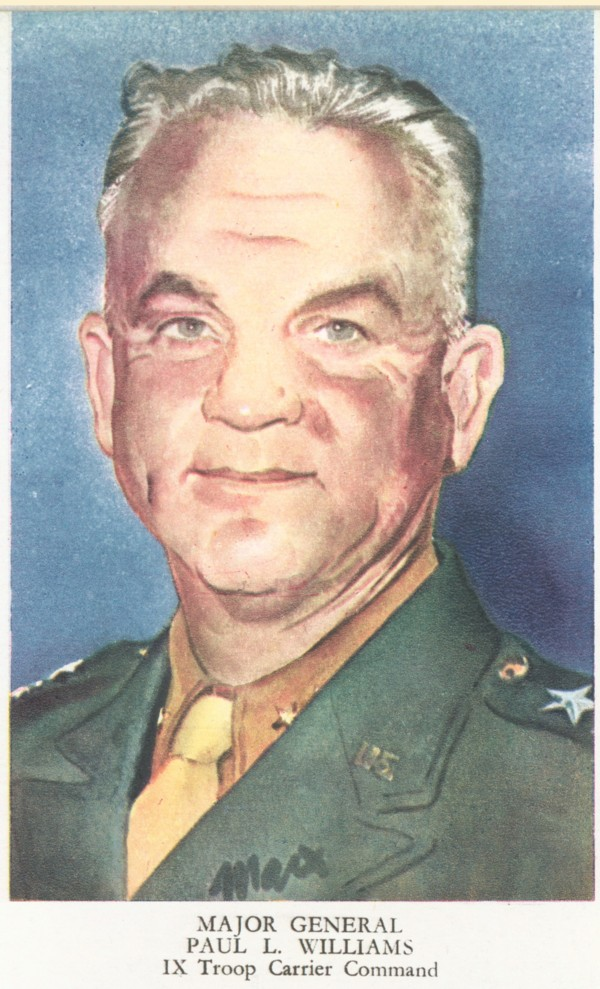
Watercolor portrait of Major General Paul L. Williams, 9th Air Force, United States Army Air Force 1945

The next major operation was Operation DRAGOON, the invasion of southern France. The Mediterranean theatre's troop carrying aircraft had been drawn down by the requirements of OVERLORD, and the XII Troop Carrier Command (Provisional) had been disbanded. All that remained was the 51st Troop Carrier Wing, albeit at full strength following the return of a detachment from China Burma India Theater. General Eisenhower agreed to send the 50th Troop Carrier Wing and 53rd Troop Carrier Wing with a total of 416 aircraft. In addition, 12 pathfinder planes were sent, bringing with them radar and visual aids, and pathfinder teams from the 82nd and 101st Airborne Divisions. The planes flew from the United Kingdom to Italy via Gibraltar or Marrakesh and moved to recently captured airfields in the Rome area. They brought with them 225 glider pilots. To provide co-pilots for the gliders, another 375 despatched by the Air Transport Command. Only about 140 gliders were on hand, but the US War Department agreed to ship another 350 on the next convoy. They had to be given special priority in order to clear the congested port of Naples, but by 9 August, 327 gliders had been delivered and assembled.

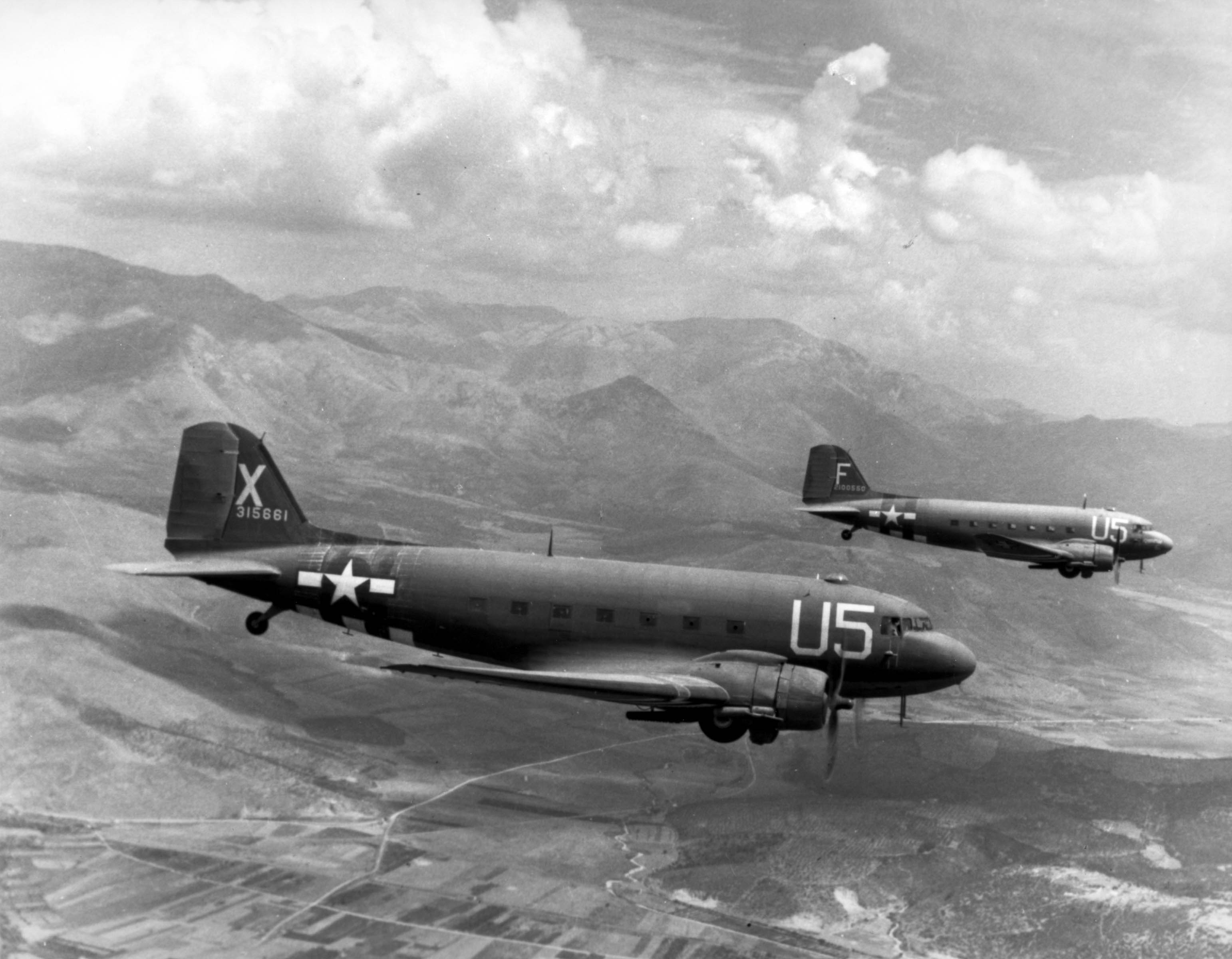
Two USAAF C-47s loaded with paratroopers on their way to the invasion of southern France.

Williams was sent from the European Theater of Operations with a hand-picked staff of 20 officers and 19 enlisted men from the IX Troop Carrier Command to command this force. His headquarters became the Provisional Troop Carrier Air Division on 16 July. Williams and Brigadier General Robert T. Frederick, the commander of the 1st Airborne Task Force, began to jointly plan the operation, codenamed of Operation RUGBY, on 13 July. Williams was convinced that a daylight operation conferred a number of advantages. The transport aircraft would have the cover of darkness as they approached the drop zones, as well as surprise, and the airborne troops would be able to begin their assaults before the amphibious landings took place; they would also drop sufficiently late that the Germans would not have enough time to prepare to counter the beach landings. Having the remainder of the 1st Airborne Task Force land by glider in the afternoon would give aircraft crews a rest after the initial drops, and would also give the airborne troops time to clear the landing zones for the gliders.

To ensure that there was no repetition of the sorry experience during Operation HUSKY, safety corridors were established in which all anti-aircraft fire was prohibited and advance notice of aircraft passing overhead was sent to all anti-aircraft positions, both afloat and ashore. Three beacon vessels were provided to highlight where the aircraft would need to turn towards their destinations. The transports were protected during their journey by fighter cover provided by the Desert Air Force and the XII Tactical Air Command. In all, the Provisional Troop Carrier Air Division flew 444 paratroop, 372 Waco and 36 Horsa sorties, delivering 6,488 paratroops and 2,611 glider troops. Thanks to the daylight and use of navigational aids, 50% of the paratroops and over 90% of the glider troops landed on or near their drop zone. Flak was minimal but fog still caused problems. General Frederick, whose troops took most of its objectives, considered that it had been "a wonderful operation."

=== The Netherlands ===
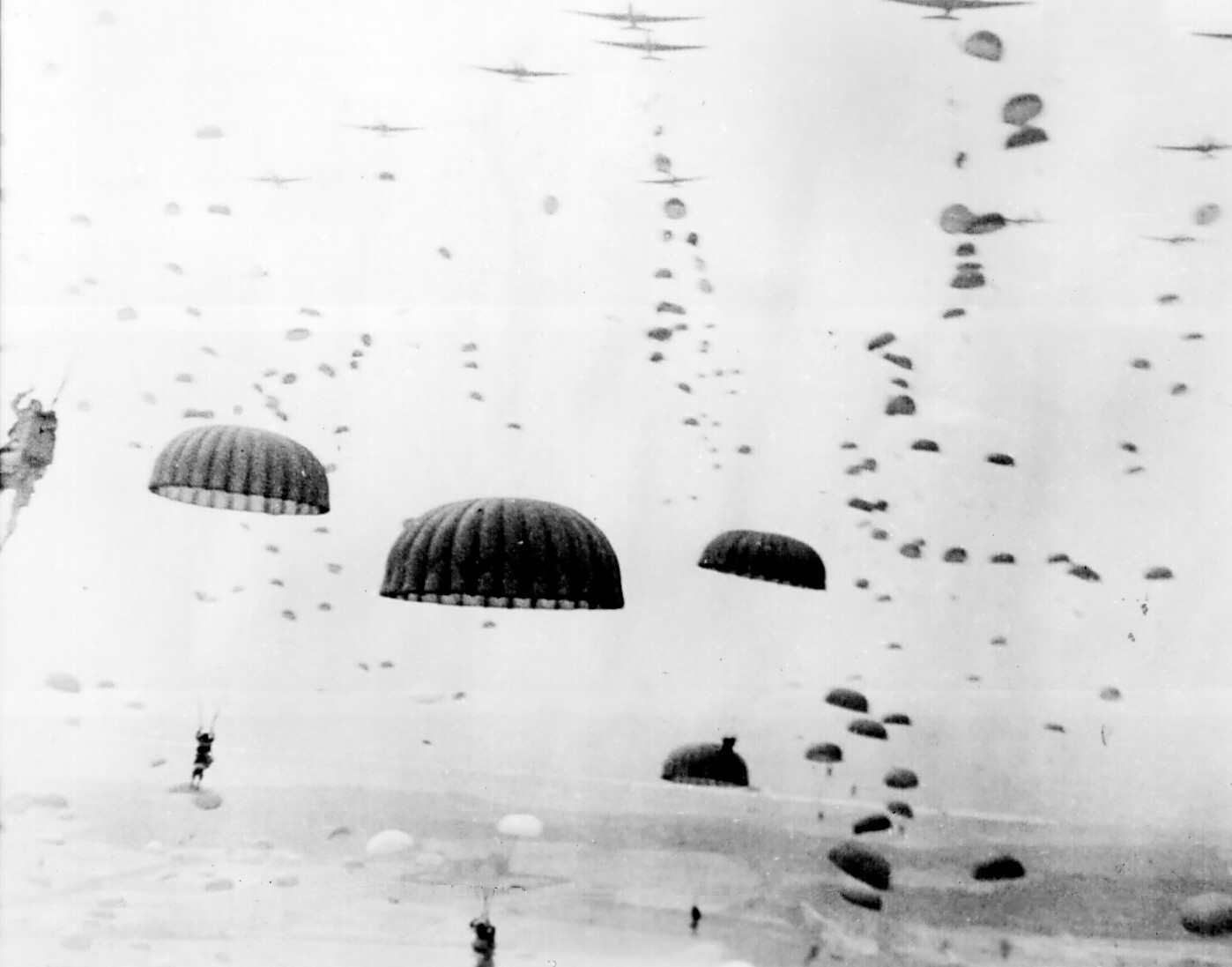
Parachutes open overhead as waves of paratroops land in the Netherlands during operations by the First Allied Airborne Army in September 1944

Williams was promoted to Major general on 26 August, shortly after returning to the European Theater to resume command of the IX Troop Carrier Command. While he had been away, operational control of IX Troop Carrier Command had been transferred from the Allied Expeditionary Air Force to the First Allied Airborne Army, a newly formed formation under Brereton's command. On 10 September Brereton held a conference with his troop carrier and airborne commanders and their staffs at his headquarters at Sunnyhill Park, near Ascot, Berkshire, where they were briefed on Operation MARKET, an airborne operation to seize a series of bridges in the Netherlands to enable the 21st Army Group to cross the Rhine River. At the conference Williams was given operational control of the Nos 38 and 46 Groups RAF, which he would exercise from his command post at Eastcote.

Brereton ordered MARKET to be flown in daylight. The conference allocated directives to the three airborne divisions, giving the southernmost objectives to the 101st Airborne Division so that the flight paths of aircraft bringing it from its bases in southern England would not cross those bring the 82nd Airborne Division from the Grantham area. Another fateful decision taken at the conference was to only have C-47s tow a single glider. Double-towing gliders was difficult and dangerous, but single-towing meant stretching the glider lift out over four days. The next day, Williams held a conference with his wing and group commanders. Two routes were considered, a northern one that ran across the occupied Netherlands, and a southern route that approached through Belgium. The northern route was shorter and simpler but the southern was safer. In the end Williams decided to use both, with the British 1st Airborne Division and the 82nd Airborne Division taking the northern route and the 101st Airborne Division using the southern one. Once again, the 52nd Troop Carrier Wing would work with the 82nd Airborne Division while the 53rd Troop Carrier Wing worked with the 101st Airborne Division.

The gamble to carry out the operation in daylight proved successful. Daylight not only helped the aircraft to navigate better, but also greatly reduced the time required for units to assemble on the drop zones. This was achieved with over 5,200 sorties by fighters and bombers devoted to warding off the Luftwaffe and suppressing German flak batteries. However, it did not eliminate the need for pathfinders. The recovery rate for airdropped supplies also improved but was still poor. The 101st Airborne Division retrieved less than 50% of its supplies, while the 82nd Airborne Division, greatly aided by Dutch civilians, still managed less than 70%. The beleaguered British 1st Airborne Division retrieved less than 15% of its supplies. Major General James M. Gavin of the 82nd Airborne Division estimated that collecting all of the airdropped supplies would have required a third of men. Nothing like that was available in battle. In all, IX Tactical Air Command flew 4,242 aircraft and 1,899 glider sorties, losing 98 aircraft and 137 gliders. Nos 38 and 46 Groups RAF flew 1,340 aircraft and 627 glider sorties, losing 55 aircraft and two gliders.

=== Germany ===
Operation VARSITY was another airborne operation to assist the crossing of the Rhine by the British 21st Army Group. Starting at 0709 on 24 March 1945, transport aircraft carrying the 14,365 troops of the British 6th Airborne Division and the US 17th Airborne Division Varsity took off from airbases in England and France and rendezvoused over Brussels, before turning northeast for the Rhineland dropping zones. The airlift consisted of 540 transport aircraft containing paratroops, and a further 1,050 troop-carriers towing 1,350 gliders. The 17th Airborne Division consisted of 9,387 personnel, who were transported in 836 C-47 transports, 72 C-46 Commando transports, and more than 900 Waco gliders. The 6th Airborne Division consisted of 7,220 personnel transported by 42 Douglas C-54 and 752 C-47 Dakota transport aircraft, as well as 420 Horsa and Hamilcar gliders. This immense armada, which stretched for more than 200 miles (322 km) across the sky and took over two and a half hours to pass any given point, was protected by 1,253 Ninth Air Force and 900 RAF Second Tactical Air Force fighters.

Williams now had routeing, scheduling and tactics down to a fine art. Not one pilot failed to follow the simple, well marked course correctly. In some areas smoke obscured the visual aids but the Eureka beacons worked faultlessly. The major innovation was the use of double-tow, whereby a C-47 towed two gliders instead of one, thereby increasing the glider lift by 50%. The IX Troop Carrier Command had practiced the technique over the previous months and found it not a difficult as had been feared. The problem of the reduced range of a C-47 towing two gliders was eliminated by using bases in the Paris area instead of in England. The combination of the two divisions in one lift made this the largest single day airborne drop in history. General Brereton rated Operation VARSITY a "tremendous success." But the cost was not light: seven British and 46 American aircraft were lost. The flammability of the C-46 caused an unacceptable loss rate of 28%. Williams returned to the United States in July 1945. He remained in command of the IX Troop Carrier Command, which moved to Stout Air Force Base, Indiana.

== Post-war ==
Williams became commanding general of the Third Air Force, a troop carrier air force, based at Greenville, South Carolina in April 1946. The Third Air Force was inactivated in November 1946 and Williams then assumed of the Ninth Air Force at Greenville. In August 1947 he became commanding general of the Second Air Force, with its headquarters at Offutt Air Force Base, near Omaha, Nebraska. In July 1948, the Second Air Force was absorbed by the Tenth Air Force, and Williams became its commander. Based at Fort Benjamin Harrison near Indianapolis, Indiana, the Tenth Air Force was responsible for protection of the mid west against attacks from the north and west. In January 1950 its headquarters moved to Selfridge Air Force Base, Michigan. In April 1950 Williams was transferred to Air Force Headquarters, for temporary duty as a member of the Air Force Personnel Board. He retired on 30 April 1950 as a major general and died on 3 March 1968.
