= Samuel H. McLeary =

American aviator

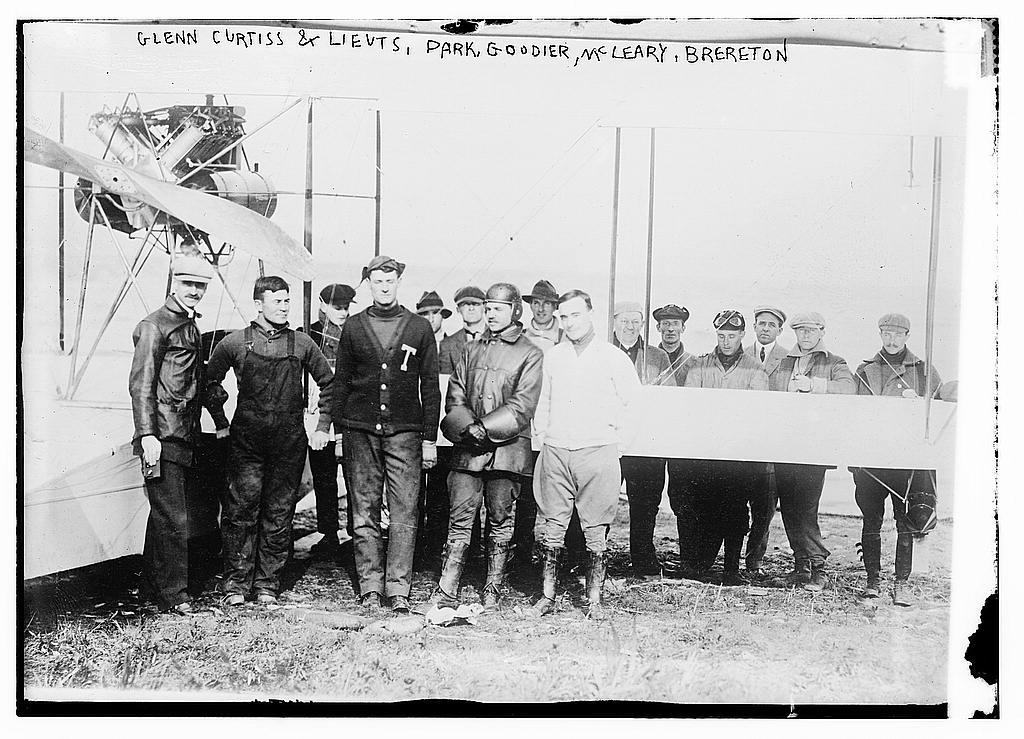
Glenn Curtiss and Lieutenants Joseph D. Park; Lewis Edward Goodier, Jr.; Samuel H. McLeary; and Lewis Hyde Brereton on December 4, 1912

Samuel H. McLeary (1881 – July 2, 1924) was an aviation pioneer. He was one of the first 24 people chosen by the Aviation Section of the U.S. Signal Corp to be pilots.

== Biography ==
He was born in 1881.

He was murdered by a hitchhiker on July 2, 1924 in Chesterfield, South Carolina. He was buried in Arlington National Cemetery.

== See also ==
- List of aviation pioneers
