= Lewis H. Brereton =

Lieutenant General in the United States Air Force (1890-1967)

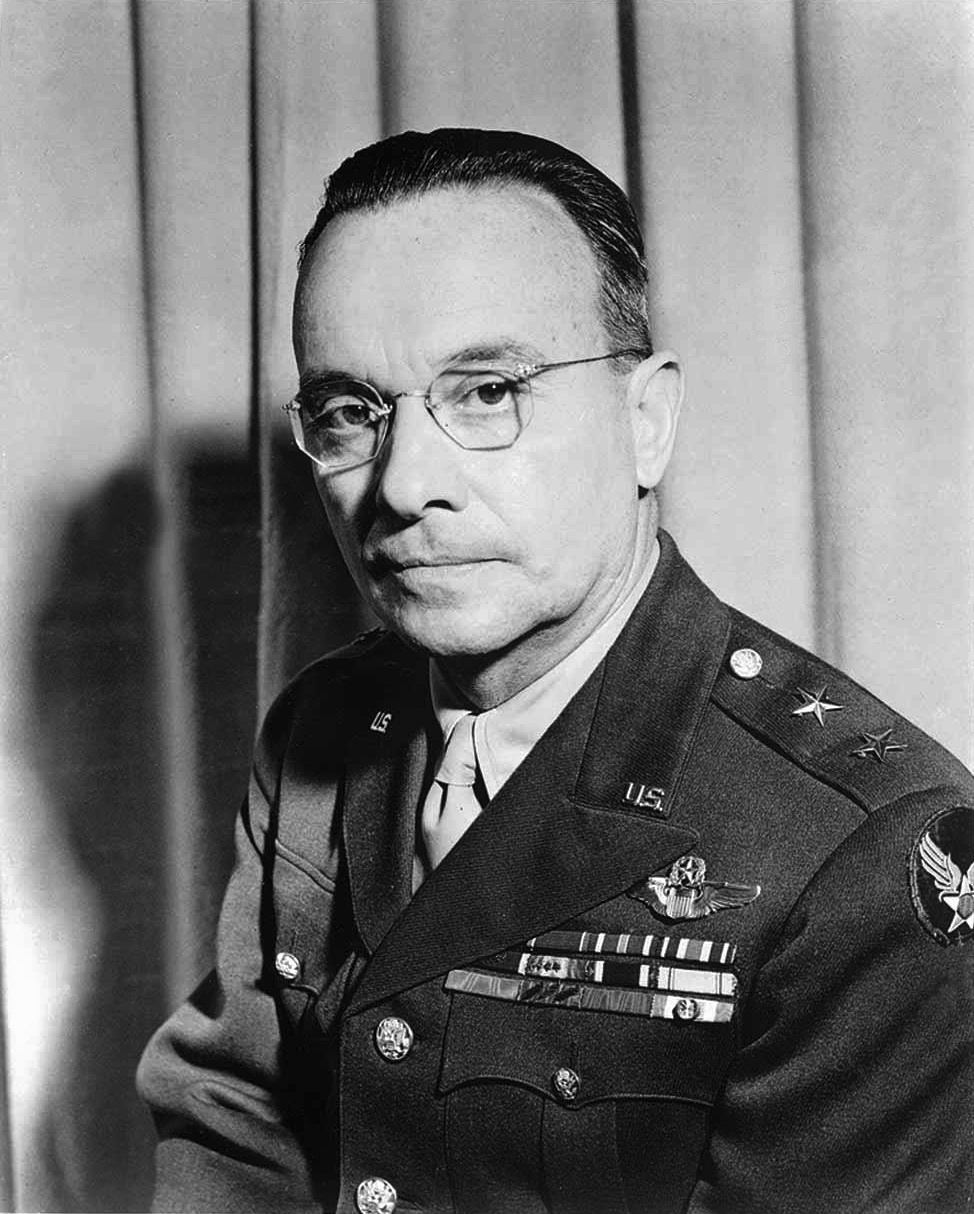
- Born: Lewis Hyde Brereton; June 21, 1890; Pittsburgh, Pennsylvania, U.S.
- Died: July 20, 1967 (aged 77)
- Burial place: Arlington National Cemetery
- Education: United States Naval Academy
- Military career
- Allegiance: United States
- Branch: Service branches: Coast Artillery Corps; Aeronautical Division; Aviation Section; Army Air Service; United States Army Air Corps; United States Army Air Forces; United States Air Force
- Service years: 1911–1948
- Rank: Lieutenant General
- Service number: 0-3132
- Commands: Third Air Force; First Allied Airborne Army; Ninth Air Force; Tenth Air Force; Far East Air Force
- Conflicts: World War I World War II
- Awards: Distinguished Service Cross (2); Army Distinguished Service Medal (2); Silver Star; Legion of Merit (2); Distinguished Flying Cross; Bronze Star; Purple Heart; Air Medal

Lewis Hyde Brereton (June 21, 1890 – July 20, 1967) was a military aviation pioneer and lieutenant general in the United States Air Force. A 1911 graduate of the United States Naval Academy, he began his military career as a United States Army officer in the United States Army Coast Artillery Corps prior to World War I, then spent the remainder of his service as a career aviator.

Brereton was one of the few senior U.S. commanders in World War II who served in combat theaters continuously from the Japanese attack on Pearl Harbor to the German surrender, and he saw action in more theaters than any other senior officer. He began World War II as a major general commanding the Far East Air Force in the Philippines and concluded it as a lieutenant general in command of the First Allied Airborne Army in Germany. Brereton commanded forces in four controversial events of the war: the destruction on the ground of much of the United States Army Air Forces in the Philippines, Operation Tidal Wave; Operation Cobra; and Operation Market Garden. (Note: Dr. Miller was a USAF historian. The title of his history of Brereton was part of a larger characterization of Brereton by a former subordinate, Major General Cecil F. Combs: "a cocky, aggressive, intelligent, experienced, pretty damn able commander.")

Brereton was one of the first military pilots of the United States Army, assigned to the Aeronautical Division, U.S. Signal Corps in September 1912. He was also one of five officers (the others being General of the Air Force Henry H. Arnold, Major Generals Frank P. Lahm and Benjamin D. Foulois, and Brigadier General Thomas DeW. Milling) who were members of the United States Air Force and all of its progenitors, but the only one to do so on continuous active duty (Arnold, Lahm, Foulois, and Milling were all on the retired list when the USAF came into being).

== Early life and career ==
=== Family and personality ===
Brereton was born in Pittsburgh, in 1890, the second son of William Denny Brereton and Helen (Hyde) Brereton. The family moved to Annapolis, Maryland while Brereton's older brother, William Jr., was a midshipman at the Naval Academy. His father was a successful mining engineer and a 4th-generation Irish-American. His mother was English and Episcopalian by birth. At the age of eight, Brereton suffered a recurring infection of the middle ear, purulent otitis media, which proved impossible to treat in the pre-antibiotics era.

His personality characteristics were said to be "cool and thoughtful", able to "think rapidly on his feet", with a "quick, analytical mind". However, he was also said to have an "appropriate temper" and "able to swear in three or four languages", a "party-loving streak", and when referring to himself, to use the third person. He had a reputation, especially among critics, for being hedonistic. Gen. Omar N. Bradley, who intensely disliked Brereton, was quoted by a biographer of Dwight D. Eisenhower as saying that Brereton was "marginally competent ... (and) more interested in living in the biggest French chateau". (Note: D'Este also asserts that Brereton was a "protected protégé" of Arnold's, but despite four decades as peers in the army, they in fact had no personal history and never served together in any capacity.) However, from July 1942 to the end of the war, Brereton had a close association with and was well-regarded by Royal Air Force Air Marshal Sir Arthur Coningham, who found in him not just a fellow bon vivant but an effective air commander on whom he could rely for efficient and competent cooperation. (Note: "Mary" Coningham was frequently criticized for similar off-duty living habits throughout the war, like Brereton primarily by his detractors in the ground forces, which included Bradley. (Orange, pp. 144-145, 163, 221))

=== Aviation training ===
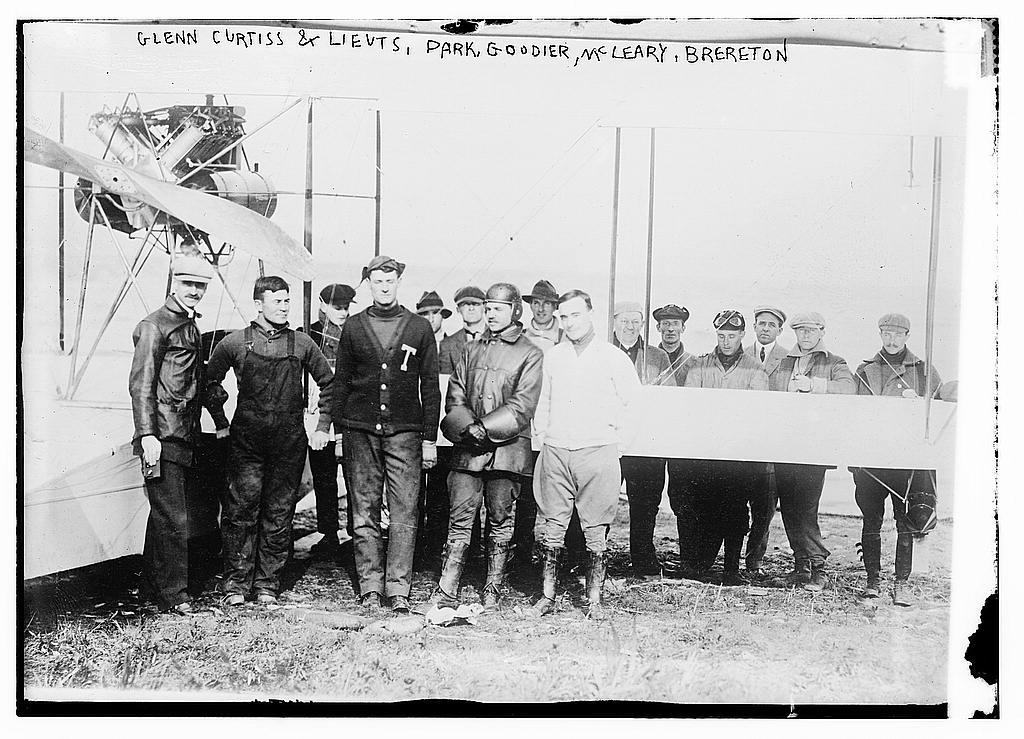
L-R (in front of wing): Glenn Curtiss, Joseph D. Park, Lewis E. Goodier, Jr., Samuel H. McLeary and Brereton, December 4, 1912.

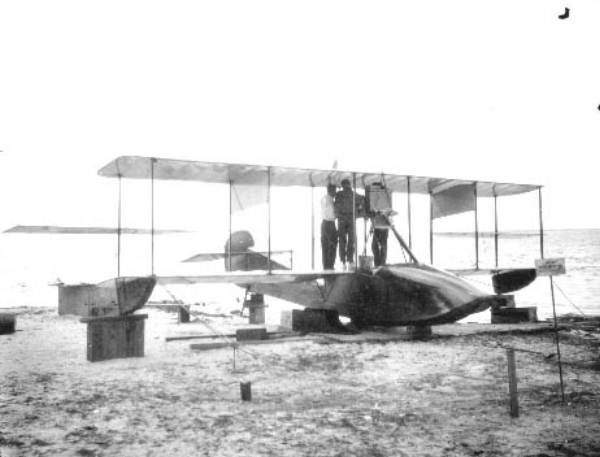
Curtiss F float plane of the type flown by Brereton in fatal crash of April 8, 1913.

He attended St. John's College in Annapolis with the intention of entering West Point, but unable to secure an appointment, he followed his older brother into the Naval Academy in 1907, graduating in June 1911, ranked 58th in merit in a class of 194. In March 1911, he submitted a letter of resignation effective on the date of graduation, listing seasickness as a primary reason, and as a result, the Academy's Permanent Medical Examining Board rejected him for active duty. After two days as an ensign, his resignation was accepted. He applied for commissioning in the United States Army and was appointed a second lieutenant in the Coast Artillery Corps on August 17, 1911, and went on active duty September 6 with the 118th Company CAC at Fort Monroe, Virginia. The next year he served in the 17th Company CAC at Fort Washington, Maryland.

In September 1912, he volunteered for detached service with the Signal Corps' Aeronautical Division to undertake flying training at the planned aviation school at Rockwell Field, San Diego, California. He became the 26th serving officer so detailed. The lack of facilities at Rockwell forced most of his training to take place at the Curtiss Aeroplane Company in Hammondsport, New York during October 1912. Brereton returned to Rockwell in November, and after the Signal Corps Aviation School officially opened in December, passed the test qualifying him for a rating of Military Aviator on March 27, 1913, the 10th pilot to earn the rating. (Note: Brereton had to complete the required Aero Club of America's certification test twice because the first was not presented in the proper order to the ACA Secretary's satisfaction.) He began to train and instruct on float planes but experienced two crashes, the first as pilot of a fatal crash of a Curtiss F on April 8, 1913, (Note: 1Lt. Rex Chandler, a student, was killed in the crash of Signal Corps No. 15 when he was knocked unconscious and drowned.) and the second as an observer on May 21. At his own request, Brereton was relieved of aviation duties on July 3, 1913. He returned to the Coast Artillery Corps, posted to the 115th Company at Fort Rosecrans, on the Point Loma peninsula across the channel from Rockwell. While stationed in San Diego, he married Helen Clason Willis on February 27, 1913, and subsequently had two children.

In July 1916, he was promoted to first lieutenant and sent to the Philippines to join the 1st Company, Fort Mills (138th Company CAC) on Corregidor. Less than two months later he requested to return to the Aviation Section, Signal Corps. Because of the "Manchu Law" regulating length of detached service away from an officer's permanent branch, (Note: The "Detached Service Law," familiarly known in the Army as the "Manchu Law," was a provision of the Army appropriations act passed by Congress on 24 August 1912 that required a Detached Officers List be kept by the Army to enforce its regulation limiting the amount of time an officer could spend away from the organization in which he was commissioned. Prior to passage of the act, detached service was limited by policy, using a regulation created and enforced by War Department General Order No. 68 (26 May 1911), issued in response to criticism of the forming of a General Staff in 1903, which many philosophically opposed in a standing army. The regulation was also intended to curb favoritism shown in embassy and other "soft living" assignments perceived as "homesteading," and affected many Army agencies and all aviation officers except those permanently assigned to the Signal Corps. The regulation varied in wording from year to year but all variations stressed that at least one-third of an officer's time in service be spent with a "troop unit." Regulations in succeeding years tended to be more complex and legalistic as challenges to the policy grew in the officer ranks, and after 1914, included all officers in the grade of colonel or lower. The regulation required an officer to serve troop duty in his "arm of the service" (branch) for at least two years in any six-year period. Leave, illness, and travel time did not count towards the two required years. The Manchu Law was rigorously enforced by the General Staff and was much hated by the field forces. It was suspended during World War I and repealed by the National Defense Act of 1920. The term arose in usage comparing staff officers sent back to their regiments to bureaucrats of the Manchu dynasty ousted by revolution in China at the same time.) Brereton first transferred to the 17th Field Artillery Regiment to qualify, (Note: The 17th Field Artillery had been constituted in July 1916 but was not yet organized, thereby providing a vacancy for Brereton to fill. The move allowed Brereton to be placed on the Detached Service List without waiting for a vacancy to open by removal from it of another Coast Artillery officer in the same grade.) and was assigned to duty with the 2nd Aero Squadron, also stationed on Corregidor, on January 17, 1917. Returning to the United States in March 1917, he was assigned to duty in Washington, D.C., at the Aviation Section headquarters in the Office of the Chief Signal Officer.

=== Air Service in World War I ===
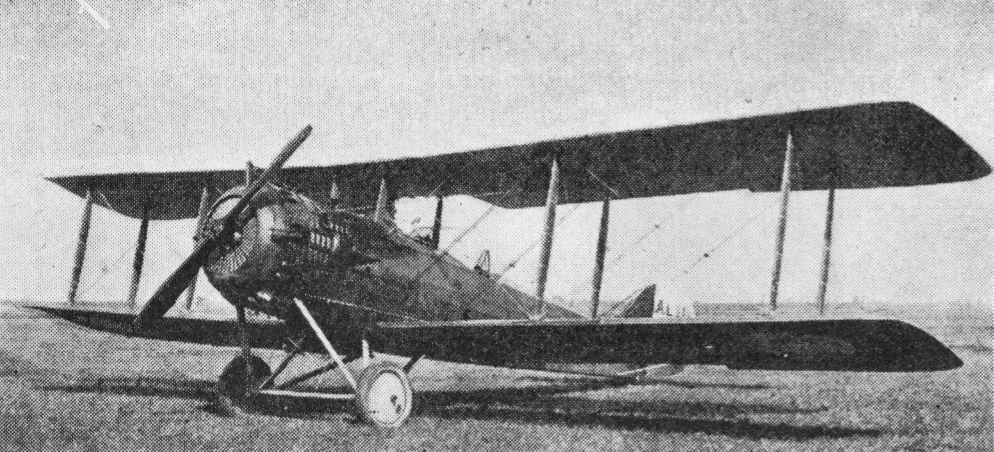
Salmson 2 armed reconnaissance aircraft

After World War I began, Brereton entered flying training a second time at Hazelhurst Field, Mineola, New York. While in pilot training he was promoted to captain on May 15, 1917, and his rating was revised to Junior Military Aviator on June 27. (Note: The law creating the Aviation Section in 1914 included a provision requiring three years' service as a JMA before being eligible for a Military Aviator rating, and all those previously awarded the rating were re-rated as JMAs. Following the war, Brereton received his MA rating back for "distinguished service." (Davis, p. 678, note 50)) During most of the remainder of 1917, he worked in the Equipment Division at Aviation Section headquarters under Col. Benjamin D. Foulois. In November, when Foulois was promoted to brigadier general and sent to France to command the Air Service of the American Expeditionary Forces (AEF), he took with him over 100 members of his staff, including Brereton. Although initially sent to a Services of Supply unit, Brereton's JMA rating enabled him to enter advanced flying training at Issoudun, which qualified him to take command of the 12th Aero Squadron on March 1, 1918. (Note: Miller (Part I) states that Brereton while on an inspection trip found the 12th Aero Squadron performing labor duties at the Amanty training center. Its commander expressed a preference for bombardment duty to Brereton, who arranged a transfer so that he himself could take command.) His unit had no aircraft on his arrival, and he could only procure a dozen obsolete Dorand AR.Is (Note: The "AR" stood for Avion Renault, but American pilots quipped that it stood for "antique rattletrap".) to fly until first-line Salmson 2 A2s became available. The 12th A.S. began combat operations from Ourches airdrome on May 3, patrolling the "Toul Sector" between Flirey and Apremont in support of the U.S. 26th Division Brereton and his pilots moved overland to Vathiménil to receive their Salmsons in the first week of June and carried out extensive operations between Blâmont and Badonviller in the "Baccarat Sector" for three weeks supporting the U.S. 42nd Division.

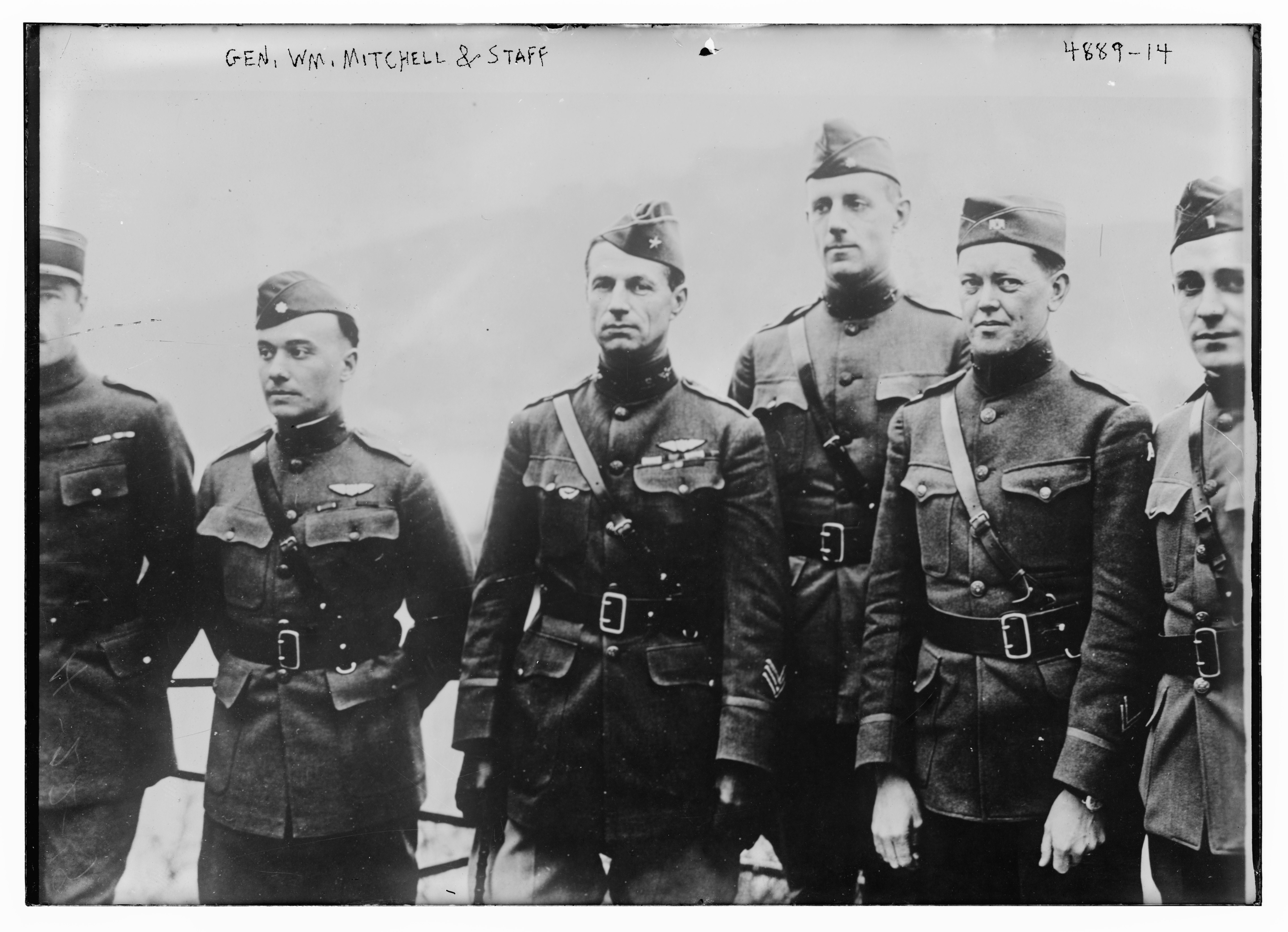
Brigadier General Mitchell and members of his staff in Dierdorf, Germany, January 1919. Lieutenant Colonel Brereton is stood second from the left.

Brereton left the 12th Aero Squadron on July 1, was promoted to major on July 2 and three days later became Air Service Officer to the I Corps. When the U.S. 2nd Division attacked Chateau-Thierry in mid-July, Brereton flew the first artillery adjustment mission near Vaux with his old command. Chateau-Thierry brought him to the attention of Brig. Gen. Billy Mitchell, who assigned him command of the Corps Observation Wing on August 28, supervising the observation groups of three corps, one army, and a French group, in preparation for the St-Mihiel Offensive. On September 12, 1918, while flying a troops-in-contact observation mission on the first day of the offensive, Brereton became involved in an air-to-air combat over Thiaucourt that earned him the Distinguished Service Cross

Mitchell, now the Chief of Air Service, Group of Armies and de facto commander of all U.S. air combat units, made Brereton his assistant for operations on October 26. Brereton was promoted to temporary lieutenant colonel on November 1. Less than 3 weeks before the end of the war, he proposed a plan to drop members of the 1st Division on the German-occupied city of Metz, in what would have been the first parachute airborne assault. While Mitchell supported the plan, General John J. Pershing, commander of the AEF, shelved it.

After the armistice, he was appointed chief of staff, Third Army Air Service, under Mitchell, on November 19, 1918, for occupation duty in Germany until February 1919.

== Inter-war service ==
Upon his return to the United States in early 1919, he was assigned to the Office of the Director of Air Service, Major General Charles T. Menoher. When Menoher, acting under an executive order issued by President Woodrow Wilson, reorganized the office in March and established a "divisional system", Brereton was picked as Chief of the Operations Division, Training and Operations Group, again under Mitchell. (Note: War Department Special Orders 95-0, para. 110, 23 April 1919, awarded Brereton, Mitchell, and four other officers (Lt. Col. John N. Reynolds, Major Carl A. Spaatz, Major Melvin A. Hall, and Captain Reed M. Chambers) the rating of "Military Aviator" for "distinguished service" in France during the war, the only six awarded for service. When the Military Aviator rating was abolished in 1920, these six were permitted to keep it. (Davis, p. 678, note 50.)) He remained there until December 1919, when he became an assistant military attaché for air at the U.S. Embassy, Paris, France, under Ambassador Myron T. Herrick. Brereton served in Paris until August 1922, where he learned "to speak French with a Parisian accent", and to "appreciate fine wine". On July 1, 1920, the date that the Air Service was given statutory existence as a combatant arm of the line, Brereton transferred from the Field Artillery in the permanent establishment rank of major, a rank he held for the next 15 years.

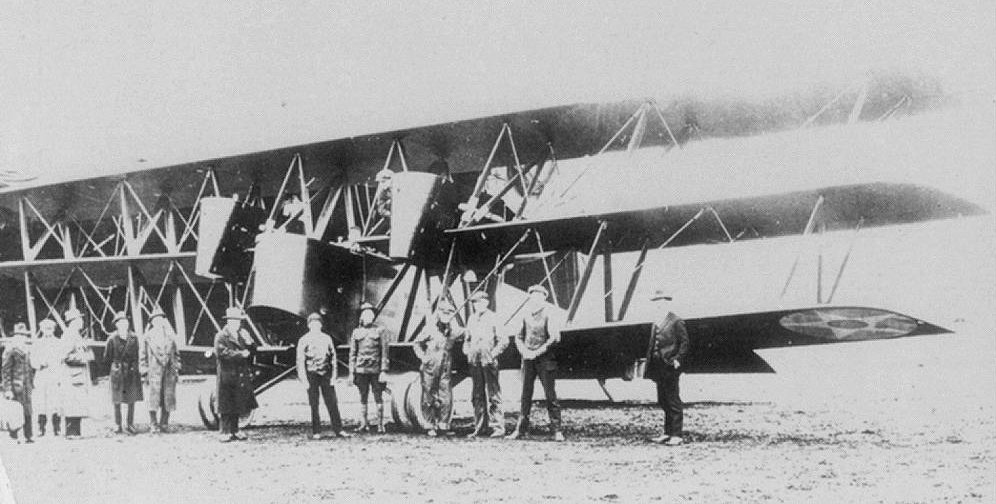
Boeing GA-1

Brereton became commanding officer of the 10th School Group on September 1, 1922 at Kelly Field, Texas, responsible for the advanced flying training of pilot candidates. At Kelly, Brereton successively became Assistant Commandant of the Advanced Flying Training School, Director of Attack Training, and President of the Board of Attack Aviation. On February 5, 1923, while on an inspection tour, Mitchell relieved the inexperienced commander of the 3rd Attack Group, at that time one of only three combat groups in the Air Service, and replaced him with Brereton. During this period the 3rd Attack Group conducted field tests on the new Boeing GA-1, a heavily armed and armored attack aircraft, ultimately determining it to be unfit for combat service. On September 16, 1924 he transferred to Langley Field as an instructor at the Air Service Tactical School for its 1924–1925 term.

=== Personal difficulties ===
On June 4, 1925, Brereton was named commanding officer of the 2nd Bombardment Group at Langley Field, (Note: In a practice common to the Army in that era, as commanding officer of the 2d Bomb Group Brereton was "dual-hatted" as commanding officer of the 15th School Group, an Organized Reserve unit allocated to the Air Service Tactical School, and its 54th School Squadron. (Clay 2010, pp. 1308. 1415)) and was summoned to Washington in November as associate counsel for the defense at the court martial of now-Col. Mitchell for insubordination. Subpoenaed as a witness in November 1925, he was not called to testify. In July 1926, the Air Service became the Air Corps in the aftermath of Mitchell's conviction and resignation from the service.

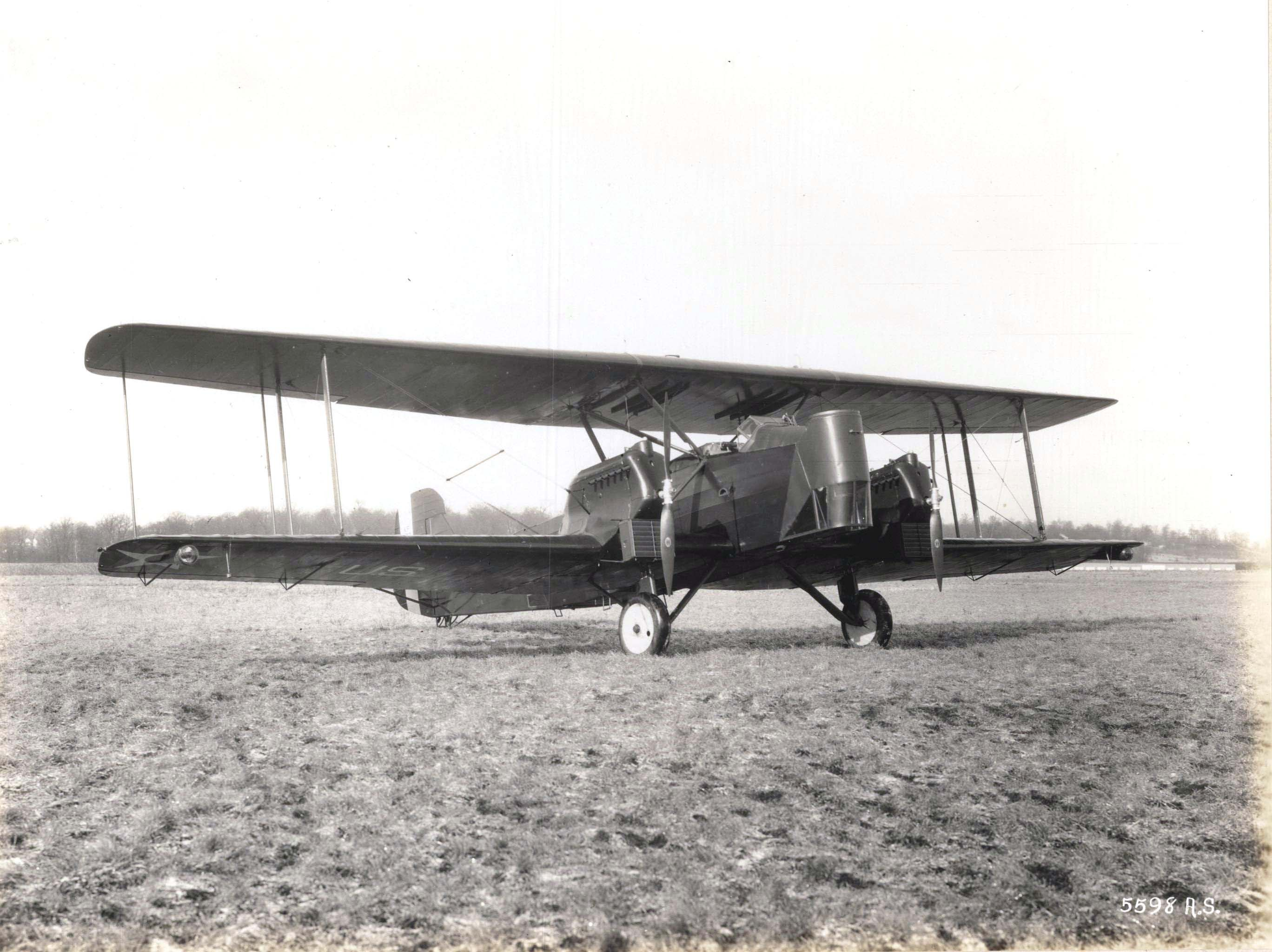
Huff-Daland XLB-5 prototype that crashed May 28, 1927, from engine failure.

During 1927, Brereton experienced a stressful amount of friction with superiors over his membership on technical boards, which required an inordinate amount of time from his command duties at 2nd BG. His 14-year marriage, never strong, was disintegrating and he developed a negative reputation for drinking. On April 7, the Huff-Daland LB-1 bomber he was flying crash-landed near the Back River after an engine quit during takeoff. Returning to Langley from maneuvers in Texas on May 28, Brereton was the copilot of the XLB-5 when it experienced catastrophic engine failure over Reynoldsburg, Ohio, and crashed, killing a crewman who failed to parachute from the craft. Ten days later Brereton requested a medical leave of two months to deal with an "incipient ... fear of flying". Although a preliminary medical leave was granted, his wife left him to file for divorce in June 1927, (Note: Per Miller, Part II, Brereton's New York Times obituary stated that the divorce was not final until 1929.) and he suffered "nervous anxiety, insomnia, and nightmares" from the strain. These culminated in the issuance of a reprimand for being Absent Without Leave for 24 hours in a misunderstanding over an assignment to lead an aerial escort for Charles A. Lindbergh's return from France.

In August 1927, after private treatment for his emotional problems, Brereton was restored to flying status by a flight surgeon, found not to be an alcoholic, and accepted into the Command and General Staff School at Fort Leavenworth, Kansas, for which he had been rejected in 1919. He did poorly, and although he successfully completed the course, it was recommended that he receive no further advanced training. His post-graduation assignment to headquarters of the First Corps Area in New York City was cancelled by Maj Gen. Preston Brown, who felt he did not have the requisite social skills. (Note: Gen. Brown commanded the 2nd Division at Chateau-Thierry and had thought well of Brereton's command capabilities.) Instead he was assigned to command of the 88th Observation Squadron at Post Field, Oklahoma, as well as instructor at the Army Field Artillery School at Fort Sill, from July 1928 to August 1931. (Note: In this assignment, Brereton was also Aviation Officer to the inactive 5th Division from August 15, 1928, to February 15, 1929, when all divisional aviation services were demobilized throughout the Army. (Clay 2010, p. 1271)) While stationed in Oklahoma, Brereton remarried, to Icy V. Larkin, and his officer fitness reports, which had fallen to "average" during most of his time in the Air Corps, returned to "excellent".

=== Restoration of reputation ===
Between July 7, 1931 and June 20, 1935, Brereton served in the Panama Canal Zone. He concurrently commanded the 6th Composite Group, based at France Field, and the Panama Air Depot. His superior in Panama was the same Gen. Brown who had rejected him for duty at First Corps Area headquarters, but Brereton's work performance reversed the general's earlier opinions and he received excellent ratings that restored the professional reputation nearly destroyed in 1927. On March 4, 1935, he received promotion to lieutenant colonel and became Air Officer, Panama Canal Department.

Following his duty in Panama, Brereton returned to Fort Leavenworth for a four-year tour as the Chief of the Air Corps Subsection at the Command and General Staff School, for which he received temporary promotion to colonel. Brereton had only a few hours of instruction duty during each year's course, where the curriculum had not changed since 1926 and still emphasized horse cavalry. Nevertheless, Brereton received high ratings for efficiency and was recommended for higher command and staff duty, unlike a number of his Air Corps pupils, including future Air Force Chief of Staff Major Carl Spaatz.

Brereton then began six and one-half years of successive command assignments, including seven tours as a commanding general. He took command of Barksdale Field, Louisiana, in July 1939. His performance during joint maneuvers resulted in increasingly high ratings that led to a promotion to brigadier general on October 1, 1940. He transferred to Savannah Army Air Base on October 25 to organize and command the 17th Bomb Wing (3rd and 27th Bomb Groups), was promoted to major general on July 11, 1941, and took command of the Third Air Force at MacDill Field, Florida on July 29. That assignment was to have included participation in the Carolina Maneuvers but on October 3, he was called to Washington D.C. to meet with the Chief of the Army Air Forces, Maj. Gen. Henry H. Arnold. There he was informed that he was relieved of command of Third Air Force to go the Philippines to command the Far East Air Force, which would be activated November 16, 1941. With war imminent, the assignment was crucial, and he replaced an aging brigadier general who had a penchant for drinking and suffered frequent bouts of malaria. General Douglas MacArthur, commanding in the Philippines, personally picked Brereton from three candidates. (Note: The other two candidates were Jacob Fickel, a long-time friend of Arnold's, and Walter H. Frank. Fickel commanded the Fourth Air Force, while Frank headed Third Air Force's Interceptor Command (and became Third Air Force commander as soon as Brereton left for Washington). The general replaced was Henry B. Clagett, who had been sent to the Philippines in May specifically to prepare its air defenses for war. Clagett was both aware that war was near and hard-working, but, as Edmunds (p. 19) put it, "lacked the necessary elasticity of mind and body for realistic preparation for total war." Brereton was the youngest of this group of generals by at least four years. MacArthur remembered Brereton from World War I, when he had been chief of staff of the 42nd Division at the time Brereton's 12th Aero Squadron had supported it.)

After being briefed on October 15 regarding his new responsibilities by Arnold, his staff, and General George C. Marshall, Brereton left Washington for San Francisco. Delayed by bad weather for 11 days at various points along the way, (Note: One of the delays was on Wake Island on October 31, where he observed the B-17s of the 19th Bomb Group land on their way to reinforce his new command. Traveling different routes, both arrived on Luzon on the same afternoon. (Edmunds1951, p. 8)) Brereton and his small staff finally reached Manila on November 4 aboard a Pan American Clipper. He met almost immediately with MacArthur and delivered to him a memorandum revising War Plan Rainbow 5 to authorize more aggressive action in the event of war, including offensive air strikes. He found that despite war warnings, the headquarters he inherited continued to operate under lax, peacetime conditions, in part because MacArthur and his staff did not expect war with Japan before April 1942. Airfield construction was behind schedule, many units were at half strength or less, a significant shortage of .50-caliber ammunition hampered training, and no equipment existed to provide oxygen to interceptor pilots, severely limiting operating ceilings. Brereton immediately instituted a wartime regimen. (Note: "Cleaned house" is the phrase used by Miller (Part II).)

He had been in the Philippines less than two weeks when MacArthur sent him to Australia "for twelve precious days" to finalize plans for use of Australian bases in the event of war, disrupting his attempts to organize an effective air force. Nevertheless, his work in Australia resulted in the upgrading of several important airfields and the establishment of the "Brereton Route" for aircraft flying from Brisbane and Sydney to northern Australia and to the islands to the north. On his return, Brereton found the Boeing B-17 Flying Fortresses based at Clark Field lined up in orderly rows and ordered their immediate dispersal. On December 6, he sent half of the bomber force 800 mi (1,300 km) south to Mindanao, but anticipating the imminent arrival from the United States of a second bombardment group, left the other half at Clark to make room for the expected reinforcements on the more distant airfield.

== World War II ==
=== Far East ===
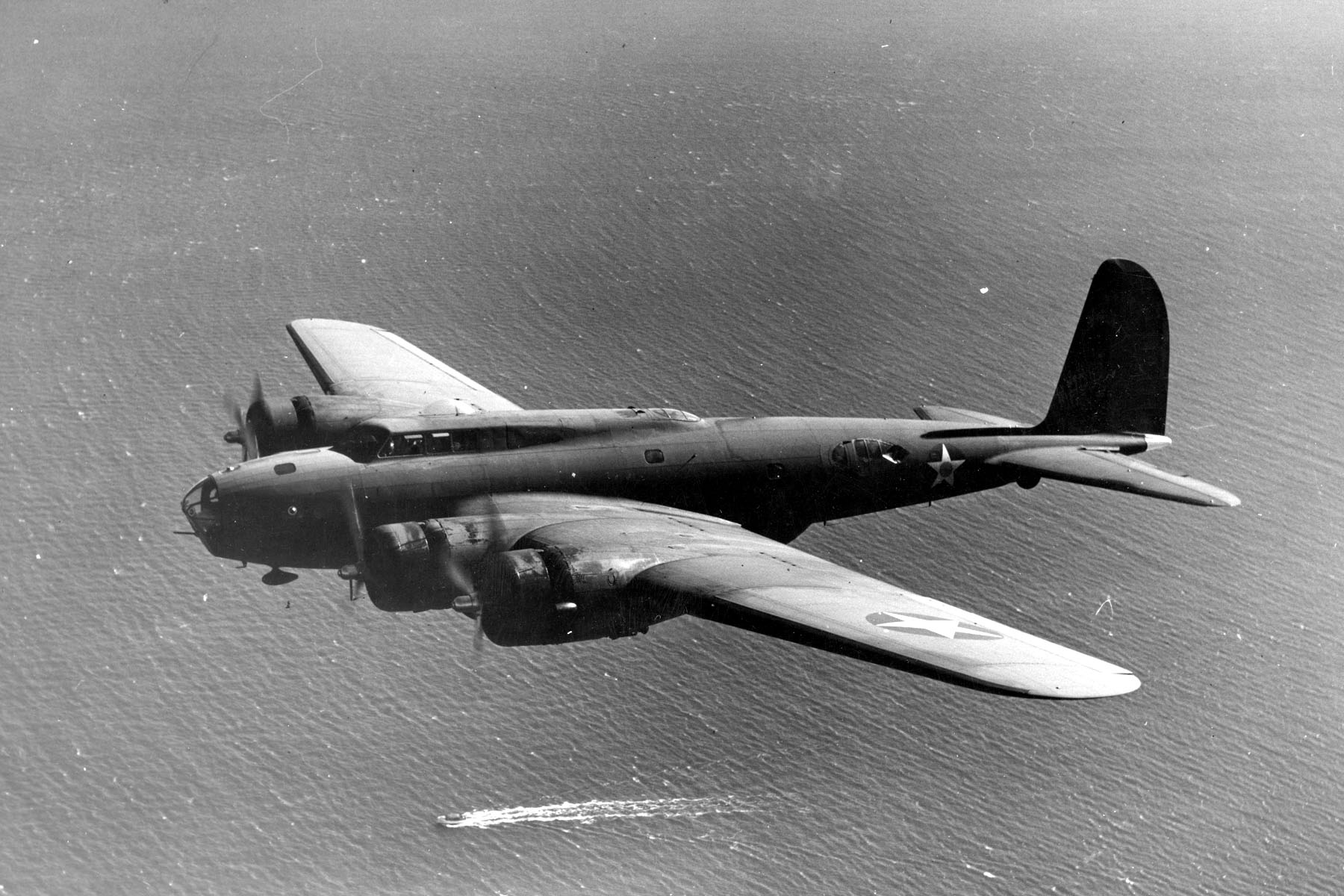
B-17D Flying Fortress

Shortly after word of the attack on Pearl Harbor reached the Philippines on December 8, 1941, Brereton urged immediate air attacks against Japanese bases on Formosa in accordance with the Rainbow 5 war plan and Brereton's own aggressive nature. However, Brereton was twice thwarted from seeing General Douglas MacArthur about bombing Formosa by MacArthur's chief of staff Richard K. Sutherland; Brereton sent his bombers and P-40 pursuit planes aloft to prevent them from being destroyed by air attack. Hours later, MacArthur initially denied permission for the attack, but then reversed himself minutes afterwards. Brereton ordered his bombers to return to base to prepare for the mission, and by then all fighters aloft had become short on fuel. While they were being fueled and armed for the afternoon mission, the bombers and many of the pursuit planes were caught on the ground when Japanese air units, whose takeoff from Formosa had been delayed for six hours by fog, attacked shortly after noon. Consequently, FEAF was largely destroyed on the first day of the war. (Note: Brereton claimed that MacArthur approved the attack. Neither Arnold, notoriously impatient and quick to fire commanders, nor MacArthur attributed any blame to Brereton during the war. MacArthur remained mute on the matter until after the war, when he denied any knowledge of a request for an attack, after publication of the Brereton Diaries.)

Multiple Japanese landings on Luzon between December 10 and December 23 forced the defenders to withdraw into Bataan peninsula. After the 14 surviving bombers of the B-17 force escaped to Darwin, Australia just ten days into the war, and with only a handful of fighters remaining, FEAF was broken up as an organization on December 24 and moved by individual units into the peninsula. Brereton and his headquarters were ordered by MacArthur to evacuate south. With only two hours' notice, Brereton left Manila by PBY Catalina for Java, where he was picked up by a B-17 and transported to Batchelor Field, Australia, on December 29. The next day he dispatched 11 of the bombers to Malang on Java to conduct operations.

In early 1942, Brereton was named Deputy Air Commander, under Royal Air Force Air Marshal Sir Richard Peirse, of ABDAIR, a component of the short-lived ABDACOM unified command of Allied forces in Southeast Asia and the Southwest Pacific. He also resumed active command of FEAF. Brereton arrived on Java on January 10, 1942, and except for a nine-day period at the end of January when he acted as commander of United States Army Forces In Australia, remained until February 23, despite requesting relief from command on February 8 over "honest differences" with Peirse and demoralizing criticism from the British commander of ABDACOM, Gen. Sir Archibald Wavell. (Note: Except for the last two days of the Java campaign, the small combat force of ABDAIR was entirely American. Edmunds notes: "Seldom in the history of war have so few been commanded by so many." (Edmunds 1951, p. 272)) Brereton received a cable from Gen. George C. Marshall on February 22 giving him complete freedom of action in the evacuation of himself and his headquarters from Java, including choice of destination, and he left for India via Ceylon on February 24 before orders from Arnold to organize an air force in Australia could reach him. For his performance in commanding the FEAF, Brereton received his first award of the Distinguished Service Medal on February 18, 1943.

On March 5, 1942, Brereton took command of the new Tenth Air Force in New Delhi. In addition to organizing the new Tenth AF for attack, Brereton was also ordered to establish an air route to China. On the night of April 2–3, 1942, he participated in the first bombing mission of the Tenth Air Force: a LB-30 and two B-17s (one of which he co-piloted) attacked Japanese warships at Port Blair in the Andaman Islands. For this mission, he received the Distinguished Flying Cross. (Note: Brereton may have flown as co-pilot because of a "pronounced loss of stereo-optic vision" diagnosed in 1937, per Miller, Part I.)

In June 1942, in response to the German threat to the Suez Canal in North Africa, he was transferred to Cairo with the best bomber aircraft and crews then in India.

=== Middle East ===
In June 1942, Brereton was appointed commander of United States Army Middle East Air Forces. He formed a provisional bomb group from 19 Consolidated B-24 Liberators of the Halverson Detachment and the nine B-17s he had brought from India, (Note: The 1st Provisional Group became the 376th Bomb Group on October 31 and its B-17s were sent to the Twelfth Air Force.) but it was forced to fall back to Lydda in Palestine. With the arrival of B-24s of the 98th Bomb Group at the end of July 1942, USAMEAF began to attack German depots in Libya, the chief of which was Tobruk, and ship convoys as far away as Navarino Bay in Greece.

His small air force was reinforced by the 57th Fighter Group (P-40s) and 12th Bomb Group (B-25s) in July and August, and Brereton drew heavily on the experiences of Coningham's Western Desert Air Force. While the heavy bombers continued to operate from Palestine, (Note: On October 12, these were organized into Bomber Command, USAMEAF, consisting of 61 heavy bombers that included the Liberators of No. 160 Squadron RAF.) the mediums and fighters moved forward as the battle line advanced. On October 22, 1942, the U.S. Desert Air Task Force was formed with Brereton in command to support the British offensive at El Alamein and gain experience for arriving USAAF staff officers. By October 25, the small force under Brereton had flown 743 heavy bomber sorties and 259 medium bomber, dropping 806 tons of bombs.

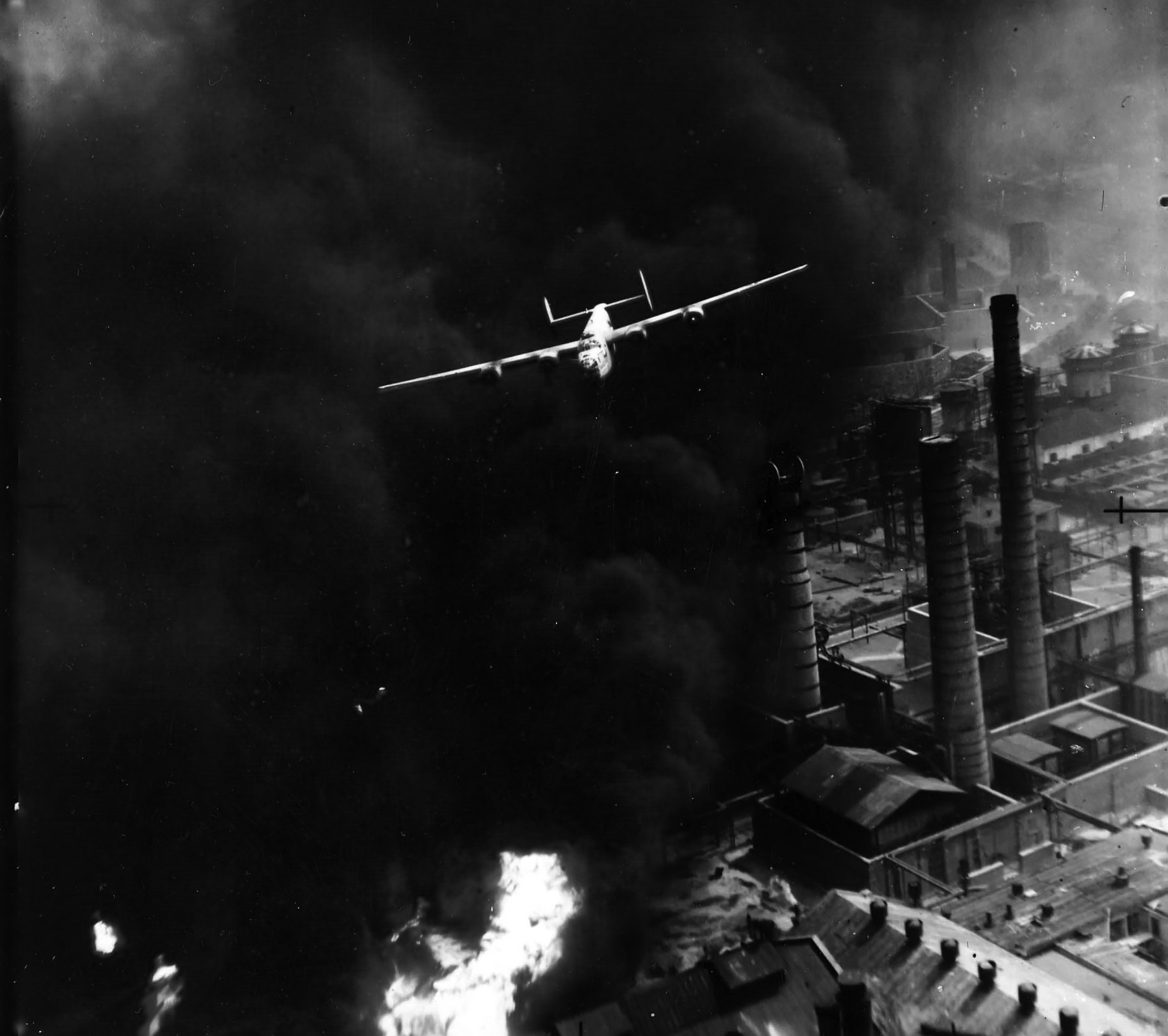
Tidal Wave B-24 at Ploieşti, August 1, 1943.

The heavy bombers used the campaign as a proving ground for tactics, particularly pattern bombing against maneuvering ships. When the headquarters of the U.S. Ninth Air Force was activated in Egypt on November 12, 1942, it replaced USAMEAF and all its temporary components, with Brereton still in command, and the heavy bombers returned to bases in Egypt. Beginning November 21, 1942, an advanced landing ground at Gambut was used to stage strategic bombing missions against Tripoli and Naples. From January 31, 1943, Brereton had collateral duty as commanding general of the U.S. Army Forces in the Middle East (USAFIME) when Maj. Gen. Frank M. Andrews was reassigned following the Casablanca Conference.

Among the missions undertaken in 1943 by the heavy bomber units under Brereton's command was the minimum-altitude (Note: Brereton's staff considered that aspect of the plan too risky; he went ahead with it because he believed the likelihood of surprise offset the risks posed by flying at lower altitudes than the bombers usually operated at.(Abbatiello 2022, p. 156)) bombing of oil refineries at Ploieşti, Romania as part of Operation Tidal Wave. Intelligence estimates predicted a 50% loss among the attacking B-24s, and in fact 30% (54 of the 178) were destroyed or written off after bad weather forced the pilots to fly at a higher altitude and into the path of German radar. The raid fell short of bomb damage expectations but the bombing was very accurate and heavy damage (but not decisive) was inflicted that would have been greater had not many bombs failed to explode. Since the refineries had not yet been operating at full capacity when they were bombed, the Germans were able to get it there quickly by putting the undamaged portions online.

Air Force historian Dr. Roger G. Miller wrote:

In August 1943, Operation Tidal Wave took place under Brereton's command. Plans for the low-level bombing raid on the Ploesti oil refineries in Rumania originated in the Air Staff, but Brereton determined that the attack would originate from Libyan rather than Syrian bases, trained the bomber force, and ably defended the controversial low-level concept.

=== Ninth Air Force ===
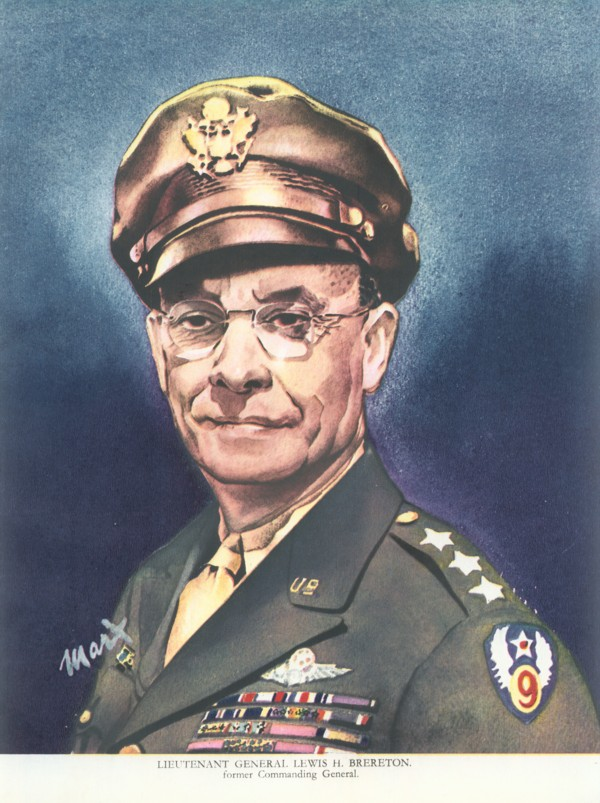
Watercolor portrait of Lieutenant General Lewis H. Brereton, 9th Air Force, United States Army Air Force 1945

In January 1943, the "Combined Bomber Offensive" plan was approved by the Combined Chiefs of Staff, calling for a force of 2,700 heavy bombers and 800 medium bombers based in England to attack German targets on the continent around the clock. In April, Maj. Gen. Ira C. Eaker, commanding the Eighth Air Force, submitted a plan to the USAAF requesting creation of a new tactical air force within the Eighth AF of 25 medium and light bomb groups to carry out the medium bomber portion of the CBO plan. His proposal was investigated and endorsed by a committee from Headquarters USAAF under Brig. Gen. Follett Bradley. At the same time but unrelated to the CBO, Gen. Dwight D. Eisenhower proposed a consolidation of the Ninth and Twelfth Air Forces in the Mediterranean Theater, and suggested that Brereton be reassigned to become deputy commander of the Allied tactical air force commanded by Coningham.

General Henry H. Arnold instead offered Brereton a choice of assignments on July 31: a command in the United States, a position of responsibility in the Cairo headquarters of the new combined air force, or command of the new tactical air force being formed as part of Eighth Air Force. Brereton "with utmost eagerness" chose the new command in England.

The Quadrant Conference in August, however, called for a combined tactical air force initially based in England that would eventually support Allied ground operations on the continent, the Allied Expeditionary Air Force. The AEAF would be distinct from strategic bombing and commanded by Air Marshal Sir Trafford Leigh-Mallory. The Ninth Air Force under Brereton would become the USAAF component of the new force while Coningham was brought back from Italy to command the RAF component, Second Tactical Air Force. In October the air units of the Ninth in Africa were transferred to other air forces and the several command headquarters of the Ninth sent to England. The Ninth was re-activated on October 16 using the medium bomber component of the VIII Air Support Command as its nucleus, (Note: VIII ASC stood down in anticipation of the rearrangement (and disbanding afterwards) and its 3d Bomb Wing, one of the original three wings of GHQAF, was redesignated 98th Bombardment Wing. The 44th Bomb Wing, still forming, was redesignated the 99th Bombardment Wing and also assigned to IX BC. A third wing, the 97th Bombardment Wing, was activated at the same time, but its light bomber groups were not assigned until the spring of 1944.) and Brereton made his headquarters at Sunninghill Park, Berkshire. A temporary administrative "super-command" under Eaker ("USAAF in the UK", which in January was replaced by the United States Strategic Air Forces) stood up at the same time to coordinate the administrative activities of the Eighth and Ninth, but when the AEAF was activated on November 1, Brereton took his operational orders from it.

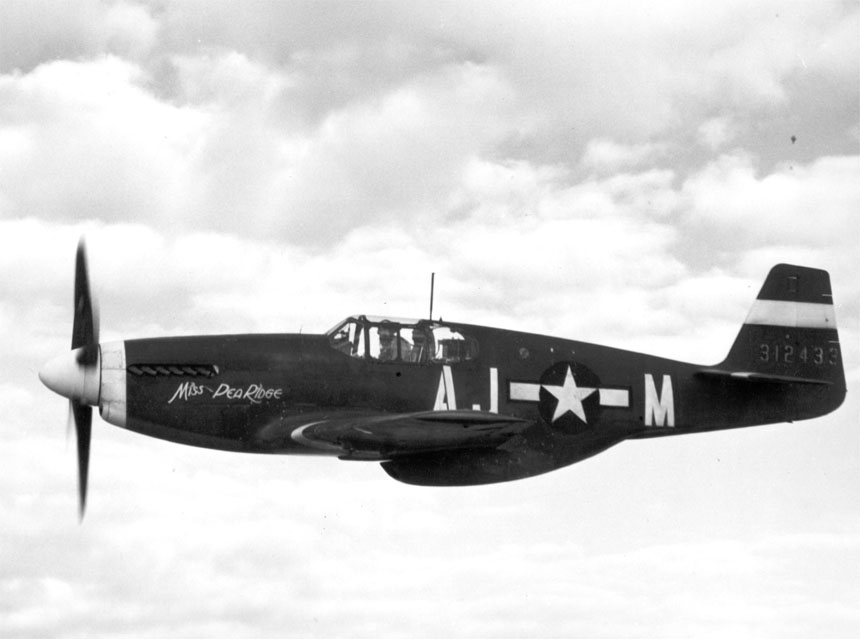
P-51B Mustang of the 356th FS, 354th FG, Ninth AF.

The Ninth Air Force was organized into three combat commands that employed all tactical functions of combat airpower: bomber, fighter and troop carrier. IX Bomber Command was an amalgamation of VIII ASC's medium bombers and two headquarters elements from the "old" Ninth, including the previous IX Bomber Command. IX Fighter Command was created out of the transferred headquarters of the Ninth AF and was basically a training organization for the subsequent tactical air commands. IX Troop Carrier Command was activated in England under a caretaker commander to organize and train its new units for airborne operations as they arrived in theater. (Note: IX TCC's first commander was Brig. Gen. Benjamin F. Giles.) Two tactical fighter commands, IX and XIX Air Support Commands, were added to the organization on November 29, 1943. (Note: These were re-designated "Tactical Air Commands" on April 18, 1944. A third tactical air command, XXIX TAC, was created on September 15, 1944, under the command of Brig. Gen. Richard E. Nugent to support the US Ninth Army in its thrust into Germany. Ninth Air Force also had a sixth tactical command, IX Air Defense Command under Brig. Gen. William L. Richardson, created in July 1944 to defend 9AF airfields.)

From the start Brereton benefited from a strong command team for his diverse tactical commands. Brig. Gen. Samuel E. Anderson took command of IX Bomber Command. (Note: IX BC was renamed 9th Bombardment Division on August 30, 1944.) Brig. Gen. Elwood R. Quesada was assigned to command IX Fighter Command, and after Ninth Air Force moved to the continent, also IX TAC. On February 3, 1944, Brig. Gen. Otto P. Weyland arrived in England to take command of XIX TAC. To handle the troop carrier command, Brereton acquired Brig. Gen. Paul L. Williams, experienced in directing airborne operations in North Africa, Sicily and Italy, to take over IX TCC on February 25, 1944.

During the winter of 1943–44 Ninth Air Force grew at an extraordinary rate. In the first six months under Brereton's command, October 16, 1943 to April 16, 1944, the Ninth Air Force expanded from 2,162 to 163,312 men. By the end of May, its strength was nearly 185,000, the Ninth's order of battle included 45 flying groups, 160 squadrons and 5,000 aircraft. Organizationally it had added an engineer command, (Note: IX Engineer Command, under Brig Gen. James B. Newman, was a highly mobile force of 16 engineer aviation battalions in four regiments for constructing air landing grounds.) an air defense command, (Note: IX ADC had a fighter wing and several night fighter squadrons for interception of attacking aircraft, but it primarily consisted of mobile antiaircraft and air warning battalions attached from the Army Ground Forces.) and two tactical air commands, so that by D-Day it had received and trained 11 medium bomb groups, 19 fighter groups, 14 troop carrier groups, and a photo-reconnaissance group. The number of personnel assigned to the Ninth Air Force was nearly 220,000, a total greater than that of the Eighth Air Force. (Note: Personnel totals included 23,000 in bomber command; 36,000 in fighter command; 30,000 in troop carrier command; 62,000 in IX Air Force Service Command; 23,000 in engineer command, and 43,000 in air defense command. (Craven and Cate III pp. 111-118; Kohn and Harahan pp. 66-84))

==== Operation Overlord ====
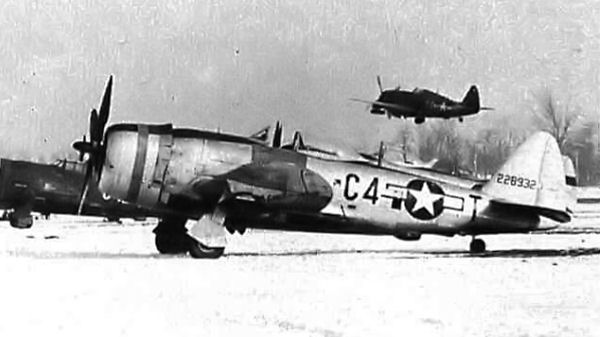
P-47D Thunderbolt of the 388th FS, 365th FG, Ninth AF.

Brereton was promoted to lieutenant general in April 1944 as his units began a campaign of planned attacks against airfields (April 1), railway centers and rolling stock (April 1), coastal batteries (April 13), and bridges (May 7) in France preparatory to Operation Overlord, the invasion of Normandy by the Western Allies on June 6, 1944. When Leigh-Mallory proposed that an "Allied Tactical Air Force" be created to command both tactical air forces after D-Day, and that Coningham command it in addition to 2TAF, Brereton objected on the basis that the Ninth would be made subordinate to its RAF counterpart. Instead Coningham was assigned to command a temporary Advanced Headquarters of AEAF on the continent active during the initial phase of the campaign, where he and Brereton made a formidable command team for tactical air operations during the buildup of the Allied bridgehead.

The American airborne landings in Normandy by IX Troop Carrier Command were the first United States combat operations of Operation Neptune, (the assault operation for Overlord). 13,100 paratroopers of the U.S. 82nd Airborne and 101st Airborne Divisions made night parachute drops early on D-Day, followed by nearly 4,000 glider troops flown in by day in six missions. The divisions were assigned to support the U.S. VII Corps in capturing Cherbourg (to provide the Allies with a port of supply) by blocking approaches threatening the amphibious landing at Utah Beach, capturing exits off the beaches, and to establishing crossings over the Douve River to assist the merging the two American beachheads. The assault did not succeed in blocking the approaches to Utah for three days. Numerous factors played a part, most of which dealt with excessive scattering of the drops. Despite this, German forces were unable to exploit the chaos. Many German units made a tenacious defense of their strongpoints, but all were systematically defeated within the week. A follow-up operation was scheduled in which one wing of IX TCC would deliver the British 1st Airborne Division to Évrecy on June 14 to support a breakout attempt by British armored forces (Operation Wild Oats) but was so perilous that airborne and troop carrier commanders agreed to it only reluctantly. Crews were being briefed on June 13 when a strong German counterattack at Villers Bocage forced cancellation of the drop.

Seven fighter groups moved to the continent shortly after the invasion, and by August all of the Ninth's fighter groups were operational in beachhead. Brereton had learned from Coningham and the Western Desert Air Force, and made a slogan of the Ninth that all units must "Keep Mobile".

==== Operation Cobra ====
In mid-July 1944, the First United States Army became stalled in its operations in the Norman bocage. Gen. Omar Bradley implemented Operation Cobra, a plan to end the near-stalemate by using massive air power to punch a hole in the strong German defenses near Saint-Lô, allowing the VII Corps to break through into the French interior. The key to the plan, at the insistence of Leigh-Mallory, was the use of heavy bombers to pattern bomb a small area of the defenses immediately before the start of the offensive, preceded by fighter-bomber attacks of IX TAC, and followed by attacks in the German rear by 11 groups of medium and light bombers of the Ninth Air Force. At a conference at AEAF headquarters at Stanmore on July 19, air commanders expressed serious reservations about the safety of U.S. troops, particularly their proximity to the target area, resulting in tactical compromises that ultimately proved inadequate.

Poor weather delayed the attack until July 24, and a request for postponement another 24 hours was denied. After the aircraft began taking off, Leigh-Mallory vacillated before recalling the mission, and while some fighter-bombers completed their missions, the medium bombers did not take off from their English bases. The heavy bombers, however, were already in the air and did not receive the recall. Finding a severe ground haze over the target, most returned to base as instructed in their field orders, but others attacked, resulting in the bombing of American troops. Brereton and Quesada were near the front with Bradley to observe the results, and were nearly killed by errant bombs.

The next day, July 25, Operation Cobra was finally launched as planned with a "maximum effort" by the air forces that included 559 sorties by fighter-bombers and 480 by medium and light bombers of the Ninth Air Force. Fighter-bomber attacks of the immediate front lines by eight groups of IX TAC, to a depth of 250 yards (230 m), were generally excellent, but as air planners had predicted, created smoke and dust that obscured aiming points for the bombers at higher altitudes. The second day of heavy bomber attacks also resulted in further accidental bombings of American troops, particularly the 47th Infantry of the 9th Infantry Division and the 120th Infantry of the 30th Infantry Division. The latter was also attacked by B-26 bombers of the Ninth that dropped their bombs short of the German lines. (Note: Lt. Col. George gave the number as 42, but that was the total of all bombers mis-dropping on July 25. Richard Hallion, Chief Historian of the Air Force, set the figure at five in his 1994 monograph added to Army Air Forces in World War II.) In both days of bombing, approximately 3% of bombs fell within American lines, resulting in 111 killed and 490 wounded. (Note: The total does not include four airmen killed and 18 wounded on July 24 when one B-24 dropped its bombs on the 404th Fighter Group at landing ground A-5. (Carafano)) Although not apparent at first, the air attacks succeeded in their objective of disrupting German formations and destroying their communications, facilitating the breakthrough.

Brereton was awarded the Legion of Merit for his performance in commanding the Ninth AF during 1944.

=== First Allied Airborne Army ===
In July Gen. Eisenhower decided to implement tentative plans for a unified command of all British and American airborne forces and the troop carrier units needed to deliver them into battle, under an American commander, over the resistance of Leigh-Mallory, who opposed the separation of the troop carrier units from AEAF. Eisenhower nominated Brereton on July 16 to command the organization, (Note: There is some evidence that this promotion was because Arnold and Spaatz had lost confidence in Brereton's abilities as a commander of tactical units after Tidal Wave and Cobra.) based on his extensive and diverse combat command experience at the air force level, over Lt. Gen. Frederick Browning, commanding the British I Airborne Corps, despite Browning being four months senior. After first suggesting (and having rejected) that the airborne troops be made a part of Ninth Air Force, Brereton accepted the command and was appointed August 2, 1944, as commander of the "Combined Airborne Headquarters", reporting directly to SHAEF. He turned over command of Ninth Air Force to Maj. Gen. Hoyt S. Vandenberg on August 8 and made his new headquarters at Sunninghill Park. Brereton recommended that the organization be called the First Allied Airborne Army and despite personal friction between them, Browning became his deputy. On August 25 the IX Troop Carrier Command was assigned to the Airborne Army.

==== Operation Market Garden ====
After alerts and cancellations of several airborne drops to cut off retreating German forces, Eisenhower on September 10 tasked Brereton with planning Operation Market Garden. A previous smaller airborne operation called Comet had been developed but then cancelled by Montgomery. Brereton developed a large three-division airborne assault in the Netherlands to be called Operation Market, coordinated with a simultaneous ground offensive called Operation Garden. The objective of the combined Operation Market-Garden was to seize a bridgehead across the Rhine River at Arnhem. The anticipated date of the operation (dependent on good flying weather) was September 14. Because that date was so close at hand, the plans of a large cancelled drop, Operation Linnet, were revived and adapted to Market.

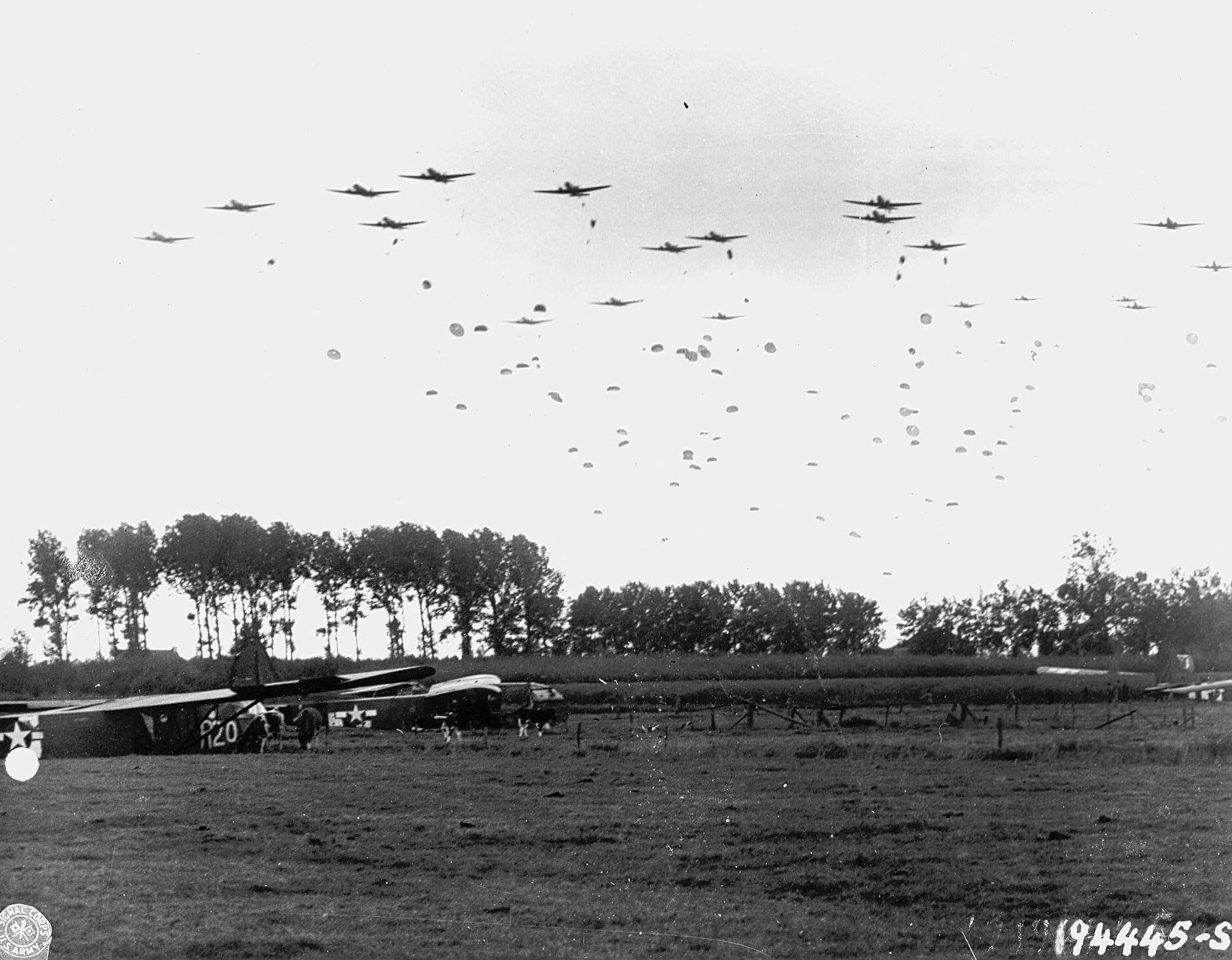
Parachute assault of the 82nd Airborne Division on September 17, 1944

Brereton, however, made key changes to the Linnet plan, first in restricting glider missions to "single-tows", that is, one tug aircraft towing one glider, whereas Linnet had contemplated a double-tow mission. A combination of poor weather, extensive resupply missions to the pursuing Allied armies, and anticipation of last-minute airborne drops cancelled virtually all training for IX TCC in August, as a consequence of which Brereton believed that untried and unpracticed double-tows were too hazardous. Brereton also decided that the operation, protected by massive air support from the RAF and the AAF, would take place in daylight, to avoid the dispersion experienced during both the British and American airborne landings in Normandy in June. His decision was finalized when weather and other delays pushed back D-Day for the operation to September 17, which was the dark moon. Finally, the shorter hours of daylight in September caused Brereton to refuse authorization for two lifts per day, (Note: Brereton had been advised by Major General Paul Williams, head of IX Troop Carrier Command, that two lifts a day would be too exhausting for his pilots and not allow a sufficient time window for his understaffed forces to complete proper maintenance on planes between flights.(Abbatiello 2022, p. 162)) and as a result of the limited number of troop carrier aircraft, the air movement of the Army required three consecutive days to complete.

Weather intelligence had indicated four consecutive days of clear weather, but after the first day, operations were delayed or postponed because of fog, low clouds, haze, and other conditions of poor visibility over the bases in England, the planned routes to the Netherlands, and the drop/landing zones. Airborne operations on the first two days had been successful to an unexpected degree, but nevertheless the overall operation had begun to fall seriously behind schedule, and only grew worse as the weather deteriorated. The cancellation of a reinforcement lift of an American glider infantry regiment and a Polish paratrooper brigade on September 19 proved crucial to failure of the operation.

==== Operation Varsity ====
On October 17, 1944, after the completion of Market Garden, the staff of the First Allied Airborne Army learned that Gen. Bradley hoped to cross the Rhine River at Wesel, Germany, and on November 7 completed a study for an airborne operation by two divisions, Operation Varsity, to support the endeavor. A number of factors delayed the target date to January 1, 1945, and the Battle of the Bulge further disrupted the schedule. After the Allied counter-offensive in January, Eisenhower planned an assault over the Rhine in the same area, and Operation Varsity was revisited on February 10 with few changes in the outline plan. Its objective was to seize the low wooded heights overlooking the Rhine to prevent German artillery from disrupting bridging operations.

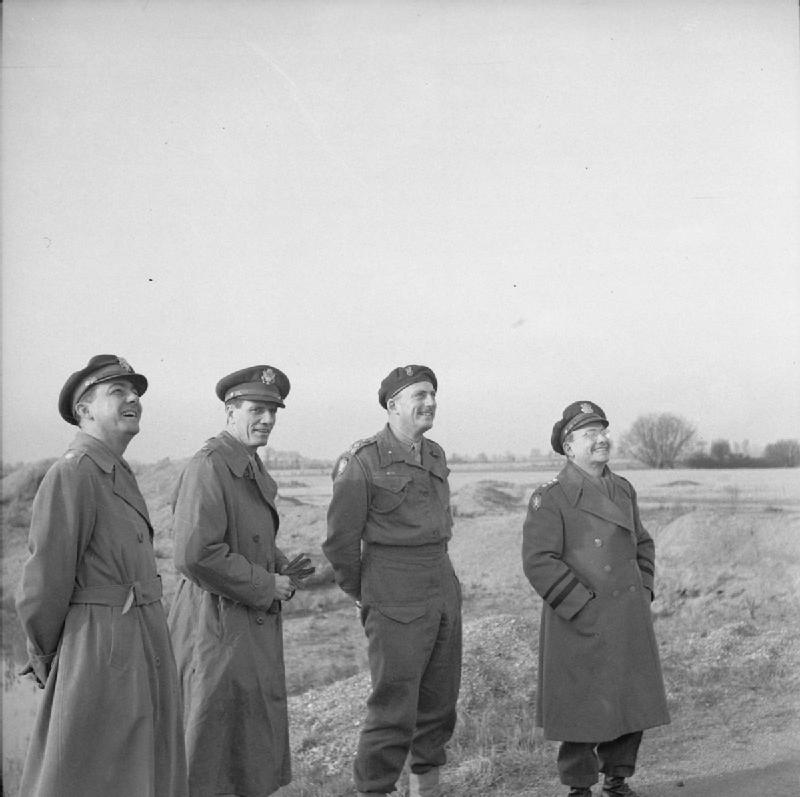
Lieutenant General Lewis H. Brereton with British Brigadier Robert Goldsmith, FAAA deputy, and American officers of the Allied Air staff watching a large scale exercise by the British 6th Airborne Division in the West Country.

The Anglo-Canadian 21st Army Group, commanded by Field Marshal Sir Bernard Montgomery, would cross the Rhine in Operation Plunder. Varsity would support the crossings by landing two airborne divisions of the Airborne Army's US XVIII Airborne Corps by parachute and glider behind the Rhine, near Wesel and Hamminkeln. A second U.S. airborne division was added to the original plan, but when it became apparent that the Airborne Army barely had enough troop carriers for two divisions, the third division was placed in reserve and then released altogether from the operation on March 6. The consequences of the poor weather during Operation Market led Brereton to plan for the delivery of both divisions in a single lift. On February 18, to establish a command post for the operation, Brereton moved the headquarters of First Allied Airborne Army to Maisons-Laffitte, near Paris.

In late February Montgomery set the date for Plunder/Varsity as March 24, which SHAEF approved on March 8. (Note: The date was advanced from March 31.) On the afternoon of March 23, Brereton and Coningham, commanding all the cooperating air forces, made the final decision to launch Varsity when weather officers predicted clear weather the next day. Although the Germans had anticipated the assault and prepared positions for 10,000 defending troops, the unprecedented size of the airborne operation overwhelmed the defense. Using 300 double-tow glider sorties, a troop carrier group of 72 Curtiss C-46 Commandos, and three parallel ingress lanes, nearly 17,000 troops were concentrated in the objective area in less than four hours, using 540 planeloads of paratroopers and 1,348 gliders.

== Post-war career and legacy ==
After serving continuously overseas in combat theaters since before the attack on Pearl Harbor, Brereton returned to the United States in May 1945 for assignment to Headquarters AAF at Washington, and in July was again given command of the Third Air Force. In January 1946, he was named commanding general of the First Air Force at Mitchel Field, New York. The following month he was assigned to the Office of the Secretary of War for duty with the Joint Chiefs of Staff Evaluation Board as observer for Operation Crossroads. From July 1947 to June 1948 Brereton was Chairman of the Military Liaison Committee to the U.S. Atomic Energy Commission, then became secretary general of the Air Board to his retirement on September 1, 1948. Brereton retired in the grade of lieutenant general.

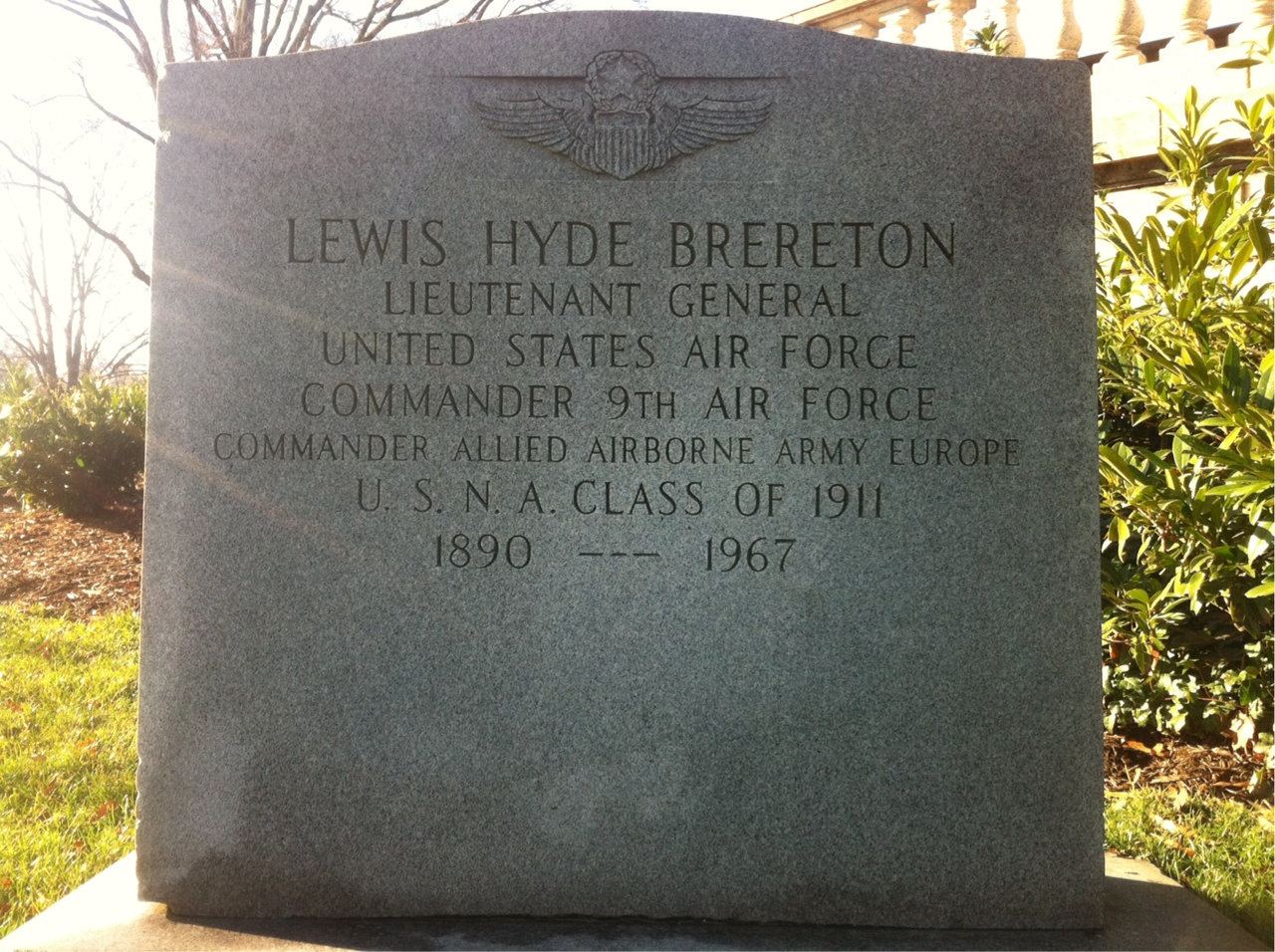
The grave of Lieutenant General Lewis Brereton at Arlington National Cemetery.

He divorced in February 1946 and married a third time. In 1946 William Morrow published his wartime memoirs, The Brereton Diaries, which have been sometimes criticized as allegedly written after-the-fact to absolve Brereton of any blame for controversies, and created further friction with MacArthur and his acolytes. Brereton died on July 20, 1967, of a heart attack while in Walter Reed Army Medical Center recovering from abdominal surgery July 10.

Dr. Miller reviewed both laudatory and condemnatory histories of Brereton and summarized his contribution to World War II:

As in the case of colorful figures ... little room seems to exist for neutral opinions about Brereton's reputation. Second, earlier historians generally have had a more favorable view of his performance; more recent historians have given him less credit for ability. Third, and closely related to the previous point, historians who have tended to give Brereton higher marks for competence, especially concerning the events in the Philippines, have largely been those ... who have written extensively on the history of air power. Fourth, an individual's view about Brereton's actions in the Philippines are generally the reverse of his view of Gen. of the Army Douglas MacArthur. Pro-MacArthur historians tend to condemn Brereton; anti-MacArthur historians are generally pro-Brereton. Many of the most serious assaults on Brereton's reputation have thus originated from those who have risen to MacArthur's defense.

and:

The evidence examined for this article suggests that Lewis Brereton was a capable commander and effective leader, but not a great general. He was a solid product of the U.S. military system prior to World War II, and as such was neither a star performer nor mediocre failure. He fits into that large middle ground of competent but unspectacular American officers who brought victory in World War II. Brereton had important strengths. In both world wars, he proved himself a brave, aggressive, and candid officer. Gen. Carl Spaatz (in his last Officer Efficiency Report on Brereton in 1946) justly described him as "personally fearless, forthright and given to firm and direct expression of his opinions regardless of the consequences to himself."

In the early 21st century, U.S. Air Force Academy historian John Abbatiello made Brereton the focus of his contribution to the anthology The Worst Military Leaders in History, since he was in command of air operations that were failures, or not as successful as had been hoped, during four separate engagements. While Abbatiello acknowledges that those were not directly the result of any decision Brereton made, and that in many respects he performed up to expectations, he nevertheless faults Brereton for being unwilling to challenge plans made at higher levels and being too cautious. Market Garden in particular "was not the time for Brereton to be conservative" by limiting pilots to one drop per day, since the operation was so full of risks to begin with.

== Awards and decorations ==
SOURCE: Biographical Data on Air Force General Officers, 1917–1952, Volume 1 – A thru L

Command Pilot Badge

Distinguished Service Cross (with oak leaf cluster)*
Distinguished Service Medal (with oak leaf cluster)
Silver Star
Legion of Merit (with oak leaf cluster)
Distinguished Flying Cross
Bronze Star Medal
Purple Heart*
Air Medal
World War I Victory Medal* (with six battle stars)
American Defense Service Medal
American Campaign Medal
Asiatic-Pacific Campaign Medal (with three campaign stars)
European-African-Middle Eastern Campaign Medal (with seven campaign stars)

World War II Victory Medal

Grand Officer, Order of Orange-Nassau, with crossed swords (Netherlands)

Grand Officer, Order of Albert (Belgium)*

Commander, Order of Prince Danilo I (Montenegro)*

Commander and Officer of the Legion of Honor (France)*

Companion, Order of the Bath (CB) (Great Britain)

Croix de Guerre with three Palms (France)*

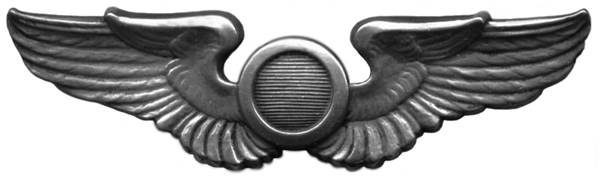
Combat Observer

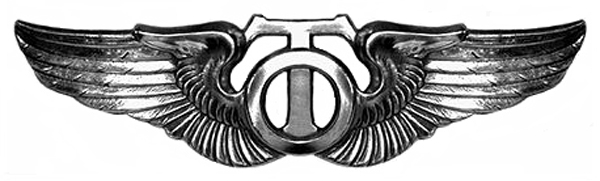
Technical Observer

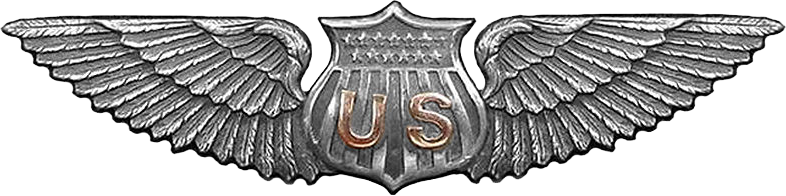
Junior Military Aviator

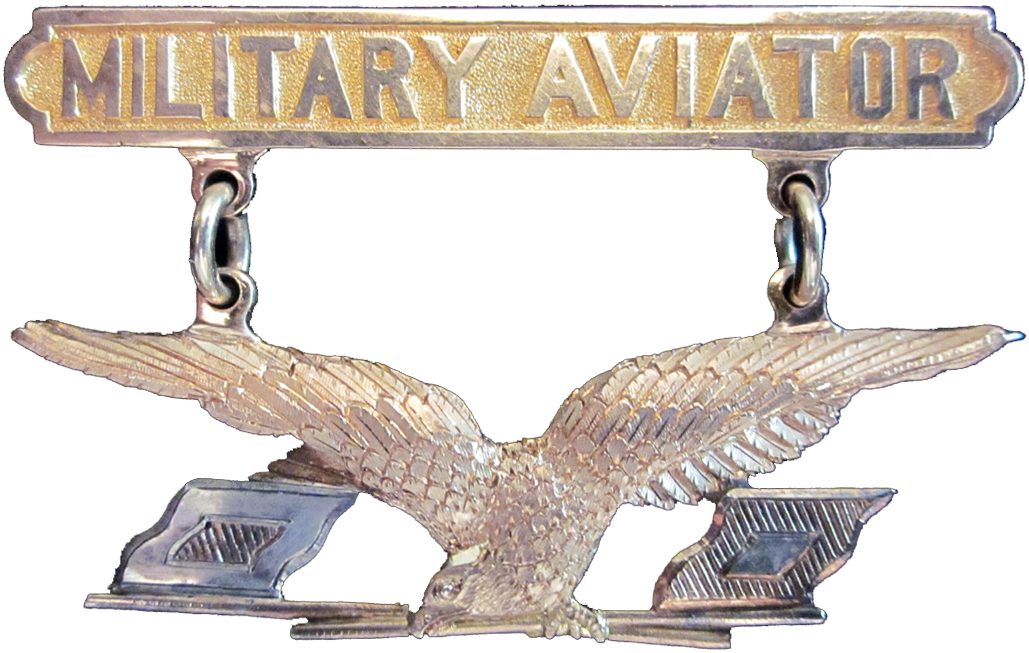
Military Aviator Badge

*Decorations received for service in World War I. The officier of the Legion of Honor and one of the DSCs were awarded for World War I. The Purple Heart was awarded in 1932 after Brereton petitioned the Adjutant General to have it replace the Meritorious Service Citation Certificate he was awarded in 1918.

=== Distinguished Service Cross citation ===
General Orders: War Department, General Orders No. 15 (1919)

Action Date: 12 September 1918

Service: Army Air Service

Rank: Major

Unit: Corps Observation Wing, American Expeditionary Forces

Citation: The President of the United States of America, authorized by Act of Congress, July 9, 1918, takes pleasure in presenting the Distinguished Service Cross to Major (Air Service) Lewis Hyde Brereton (ASN: 0–3132), for extraordinary heroism in action while serving with Corps Observation Wing, Air Service, A.E.F., over Thiaucourt, France, 12 September 1918. Major Brereton, together with an observer, voluntarily and pursuant to a request for special mission, left his airdrome, crossed the enemy lines over Lironville, and proceeded to Thiaucourt. In spite of poor visibility, which forced them to fly at a very low altitude, and in spite of intense and accurate anti-aircraft fire they maintained their flight along their course and obtained valuable information. Over Thiaucourt they were suddenly attacked by four enemy monoplane Fokkers. Maneuvering his machine so that his observer could obtain a good field of fire, he entered into combat. His observer's guns becoming jammed, he withdrew until the jam was cleared, when he returned to the combat. His observer then becoming wounded, he coolly made a landing within friendly lines, although followed down by the enemy to within 25 meters of the ground. By this act he made himself an inspiration and example to all the members of his command.

== Dates of rank ==
Insignia	Rank	Component	Date
No insignia in 1911	Ensign	United States Navy	March 1911
No insignia in 1911	Second Lieutenant	Coast Artillery Corps	August 17, 1911
	First Lieutenant	Coast Artillery Corps	July 11, 1916
	First Lieutenant	Field Artillery	January 13, 1917
	Captain	Field Artillery	May 15, 1917
	Captain	Signal Corps	June 27, 1917
	Major	Temporary	July 2, 1918
	Lieutenant Colonel	Army Air Service	November 1, 1918
	Major	Air Service	July 1, 1920
	Major	Army Air Corps	July 2, 1926
	Lieutenant Colonel	Army Air Corps	March 4, 1935
	Colonel	Temporary	August 26, 1936
	Colonel	Army Air Corps	August 1, 1940
	Brigadier General	Army of the United States	October 1, 1940
	Major General	Army of the United States	July 11, 1941
	Colonel	Army Air Forces	March 9, 1942
	Lieutenant General	Army of the United States	April 28, 1944
	Brigadier General	Army Air Forces	June 2, 1946
	Lieutenant General	United States Air Force	September 18, 1947
	Lieutenant General	United States Air Force (Retired)	September 1, 1948
