= Poligono di Furbara =

The Poligono di Furbara was a small launchpad at the Furbara airport, in the municipality of Santa Marinella, on the Italian coast north of Rome. It was used for testing the first Italian-designed and built missiles from the late 1930s.

It was later abandoned as a launch site. In the mid-1950s its activities were transferred to the new ITAF facilities at Salto di Quirra, on Sardinia.
