= Lewis Edward Goodier Sr. =

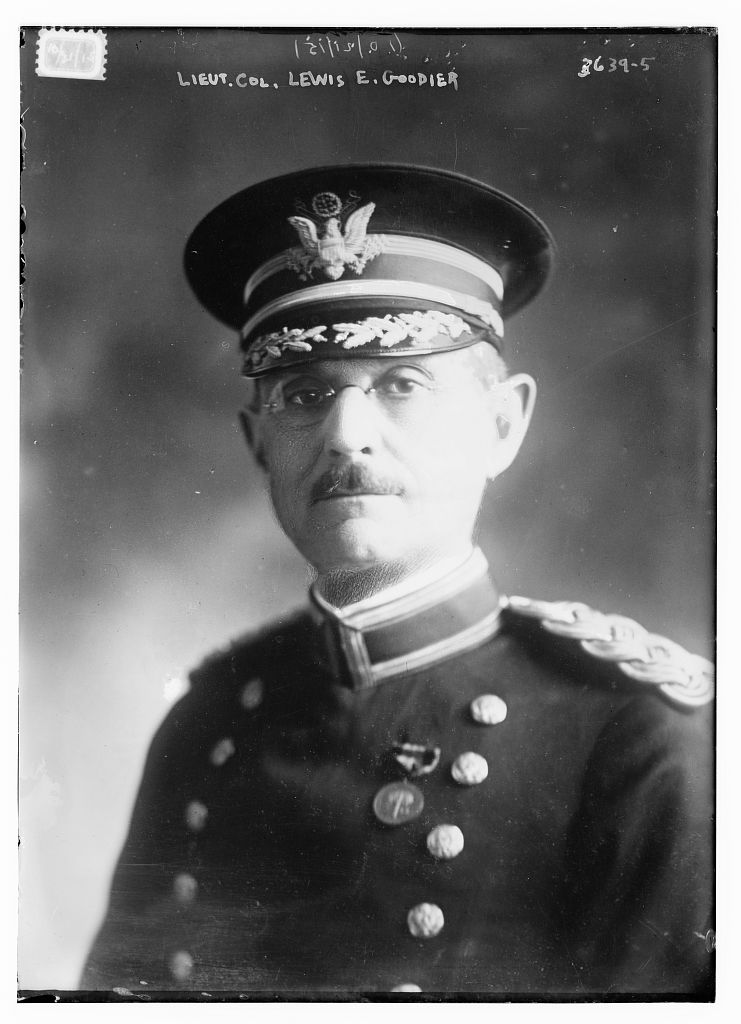
Lewis Edward Goodier Sr.

Lieutenant Colonel Lewis Edward Goodier Sr. (March 23, 1857 – May 14, 1935) was the Judge Advocate General's Corps, United States Army of the Department of the West in San Francisco, California.

== Biography ==
Goodier was born on March 23, 1857, in Utica, New York. He attended Yale University. He married Jane Estelle Northrup around 1884 and had as their son Lewis Edward Goodier Jr.

A court martial in 1915 resulted in a reprimand for advising two junior officers on filing a complaint against a more senior officer.

He died on May 14, 1935, in San Francisco, California. He was buried in San Francisco National Cemetery.
