= Lewis E. Goodier Jr. =

Aviation pioneer

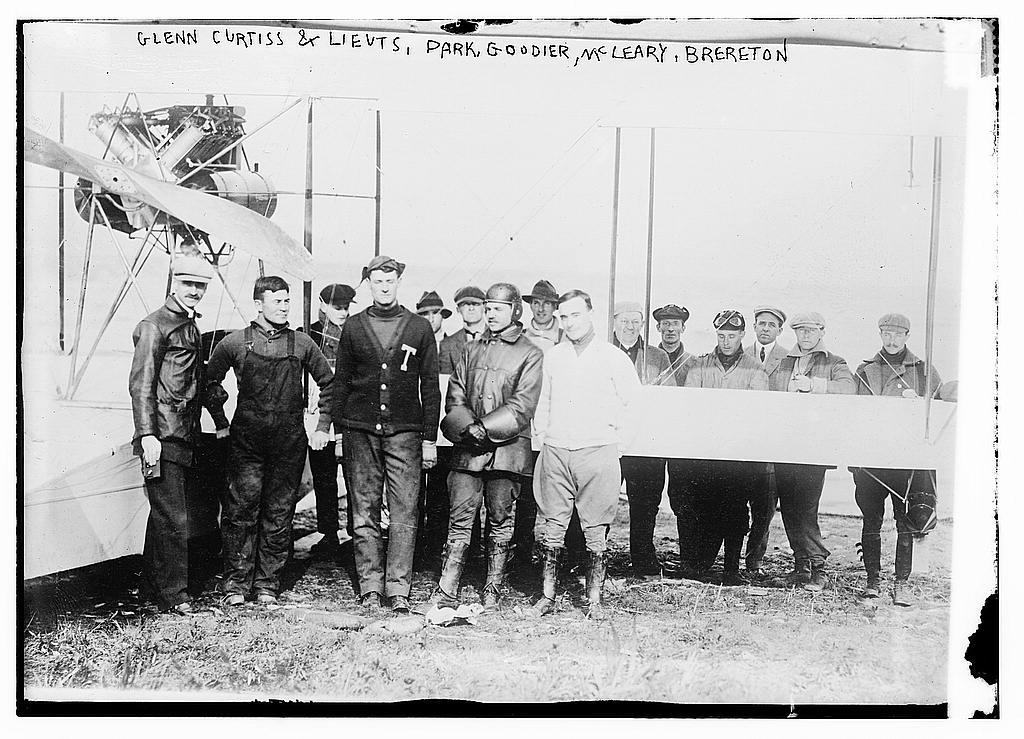
Glenn Curtiss and Lieutenants Joseph D. Park; Lewis E. Goodier Jr.; Samuel H. McLeary; and Lewis Hyde Brereton on December 4, 1912

Lewis Edward Goodier Jr. (August 5, 1885 – December 29, 1961) was a pioneer aviator and, as such, a member of the Early Birds of Aviation. He served in the United States Army and later the United States Air Force, and rose to the rank of lieutenant colonel.

== Biography ==
He was born on August 5, 1885, to Lewis Edward Goodier Sr. and Jane E. Northrop in Utica, New York. He graduated from the Georgia School of Technology c. 1908 and was a member of the ANAK Society, the school's oldest known secret society and honor society.

He joined the United States Army and was one of "the first five officers to report to the new Signal Corps Aviation School on North Island near San Diego, California". Signal Corps Aviation School General Order No. 10, dated August 15, 1914, listed Captain Lewis E. Goodier Jr. as the commanding officer of 2nd Company, 1st Aero Squadron, with the school under the command of Captain Arthur S. Cowan. On August 17, 1914, Captain Goodier tested a "bomb-dropping device designed by Lt. Riley Scott in a Martin Model T".

He was seriously injured in a demonstration accident on November 5, 1914 while flying with Glenn L. Martin in a new aircraft undergoing a required competitive slow speed test, the aircraft stalled, and when Martin overcorrected with too much throttle, went into a tailspin. Goodier suffered a nearly severed nose, two broken legs, a re-opened skull fracture, and a severe puncture of his knee from the drive shaft. The accident occurred amidst a series of fatal training crashes, all involving the Wright Model C pusher airplane, that resulted in six deaths between July 1913 and February 1914, and culminated in pilots refusing to fly pusher airplanes. Captain Cowan refused to discontinue use of the aircraft, dismissing the pilots as "nothing but amateurs".

While recuperating, Goodier Jr. and his father, Lieutenant Colonel Lewis Edward Goodier Sr., the Judge Advocate of the Western Department in San Francisco, assisted two other officers in trying to prefer charges against Cowan for fraudulently collecting flight pay. The charges were dismissed, and Goodier Sr. himself received a reprimand in a 1915 court-martial. However, evidence was introduced during the court-martial showing a pattern of retribution against officers on flying duty who fell into Cowan's disfavor, and that Lieutenant Colonel Reber, the head of the Aviation Section, and Cowan had used Captain Goodier's injuries as a pretext to have him dismissed from the Aviation Section while he was recuperating.

Goodier Jr. continued to serve in the military into World War II and retired as a lieutenant colonel in the United States Air Force.

In 1919, he married Myrtis Mahood.

He died on December 29, 1961, in Santa Barbara, California.
