= Air yacht =

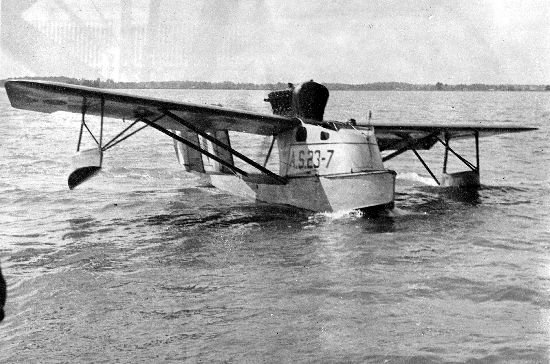
Loening S-1 Flying Yacht

An air yacht is a private aircraft, usually a flying boat. They developed between the wars as a recreation and status symbol for rich businessmen.

The first aviation of this form developed immediately before World War I, when 'sporting' gentlemen, i.e. those both rich and with ample leisure time, could indulge in private flying. For the first time this regarded flight as a means of safe and reliable transport, not merely an achievement in itself. Right from the outset, the speed of flight and its ability to make long distances manageable was recognised as an advantage. The idea of seasonal commuting between New York and Florida, previously done by train, was one goal.

All aspects of aviation were spurred by World War I and there were many technical developments, particularly for engine reliability and the construction of larger, more robust aircraft, including seaplanes. Despite this, the time immediately after World War I was a recession in the aircraft industry, as the surplus market was flooded by ex-military machines and engines. Manufacturers sought any available market they could, including building a handful of specialised aircraft for the very rich. In a more buoyant climate, this minority market might have been less attractive.

A typical air yacht of the early 1920s was the Kirkham Air Yacht, built to the order of Harold Vanderbilt. Vanderbilt intended it for transport between his business offices in New York and the family estate at Newport, Rhode Island. Like the contemporary Loening Flying Yacht, it included an enclosed passenger cabin for four with an open pilot's cockpit ahead. Both were of the most modern construction, as monoplanes with duralumin stressed-skin construction. A difference was that the Loening used a war-surplus Liberty engine whilst the Kirkham had the latest, and more powerful, British Napier Lion. Both were flying boats, able to land on any expanse of open water, which was available to the rich at both New York and their seaside country homes. The journey to Newport could be made in around two hours, three times faster than by train and still twice as fast as the journey by car today. As public airfields developed in this decade, later aircraft became amphibians, making them more flexible about their destinations.

In 1927, Vanderbilt's Kirkham was destroyed in a hangar fire (Note: Reports of the hangar fire are conflicting and it is not clear if there was one fire, which aircraft was involved, or two. Many reports claim that the Kirkham burned in a fire and was replaced by the Fokker B.IIIc because this was available quickly.) and he replaced it with a larger, six-seater Fokker. First the Fokker B.IIIC registered as NC149,. (Note: later NC3996) This design had been developed by Fokker as the B.3 military patrol aircraft, but failed to sell to the Dutch Navy and so had been converted with a passenger cabin and shipped to the US, meaning it was available to Vanderbilt at short notice. A crash in March 1928, or possibly a further hangar fire, destroyed Vanderbilt's Fokker and this was replaced by NC7887, an example of Fokker's new F.11 design. This was an amphibian design, making it much more flexible for travel inland. Flight in this 'Golden Age' period of aviation was developing rapidly in the US, and better airfield facilities were becoming available throughout the country.

Even after the start of the Great Depression, these very-rich pilots were little affected and continued to order larger and larger custom-designed aircraft. Commercial land-based aircraft were also developing and many new owners, affluent but not super-rich, could afford a production-line aircraft when they could not afford a custom design. 'Production' in this pre-war era often meant only a handful of aircraft.

Air yachts were owned by rich businessmen and were also found to be useful for purely business travel. These were mostly landplanes by now, rather than seaplanes. Belgian financier Alfred Loewenstein used a Fokker F.VII Trimotor for this purpose, but fell to his death from it in 1928. In time they gave rise to the wider use of executive aircraft.

== Air yachts ==
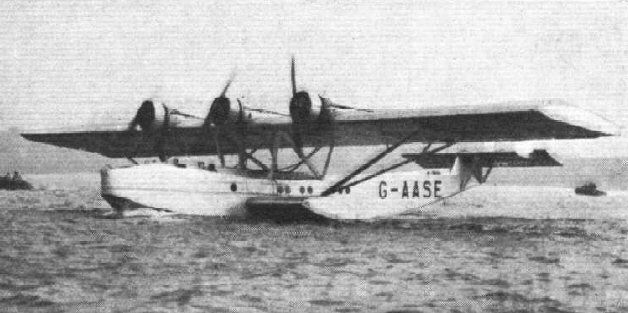
Supermarine Air-Yacht

Early air yachts and their owners:

- Loening Type 23 Flying Yacht (1921), Vincent Astor
- Kirkham Air Yacht (1925), Harold Vanderbilt
- Supermarine Solent (1928), Ernest Guinness
- Fokker B.IIIC (1927), Harold Vanderbilt, as a replacement for his Kirkham
- Fokker F.11 (1928), Harold Vanderbilt, Gar Wood
- Sikorsky S-38 (1928) Howard Hughes, newspaper publisher Robert R. McCormick, John Hay Whitney
- Supermarine Air Yacht (1930) Ernest Guinness, later Mrs J. J. James as Windward III
- Saro Cloud (1930), Ernest Guinness. Unhappy with the underpowered Supermarine Air Yacht, Guinness purchased a Saro Cloud instead.
- Douglas Dolphin (1931), Harold Vanderbilt, Armand Esders
- Sikorsky S-43 (1935), Harold Vanderbilt and Howard Hughes.
- Spencer Air Car (1941), an attempt to popularise the concept and make it more accessible to less wealthy purchasers
- Republic Seabee (1946), a post-war development of the Air Car, with over a thousand built.

Despite its name, the Bach Air Yacht (1928) was a 10-passenger small airliner, rather than an individual's 'air yacht' in this sense.

== In popular culture ==
In the 2004 biopic The Aviator, Howard Hughes is portrayed as wooing actress and fellow pilot Katharine Hepburn with flights in his Sikorsky S-38.
