= Fokker F-11 =

Luxury flying boat

F-11 or B.IV
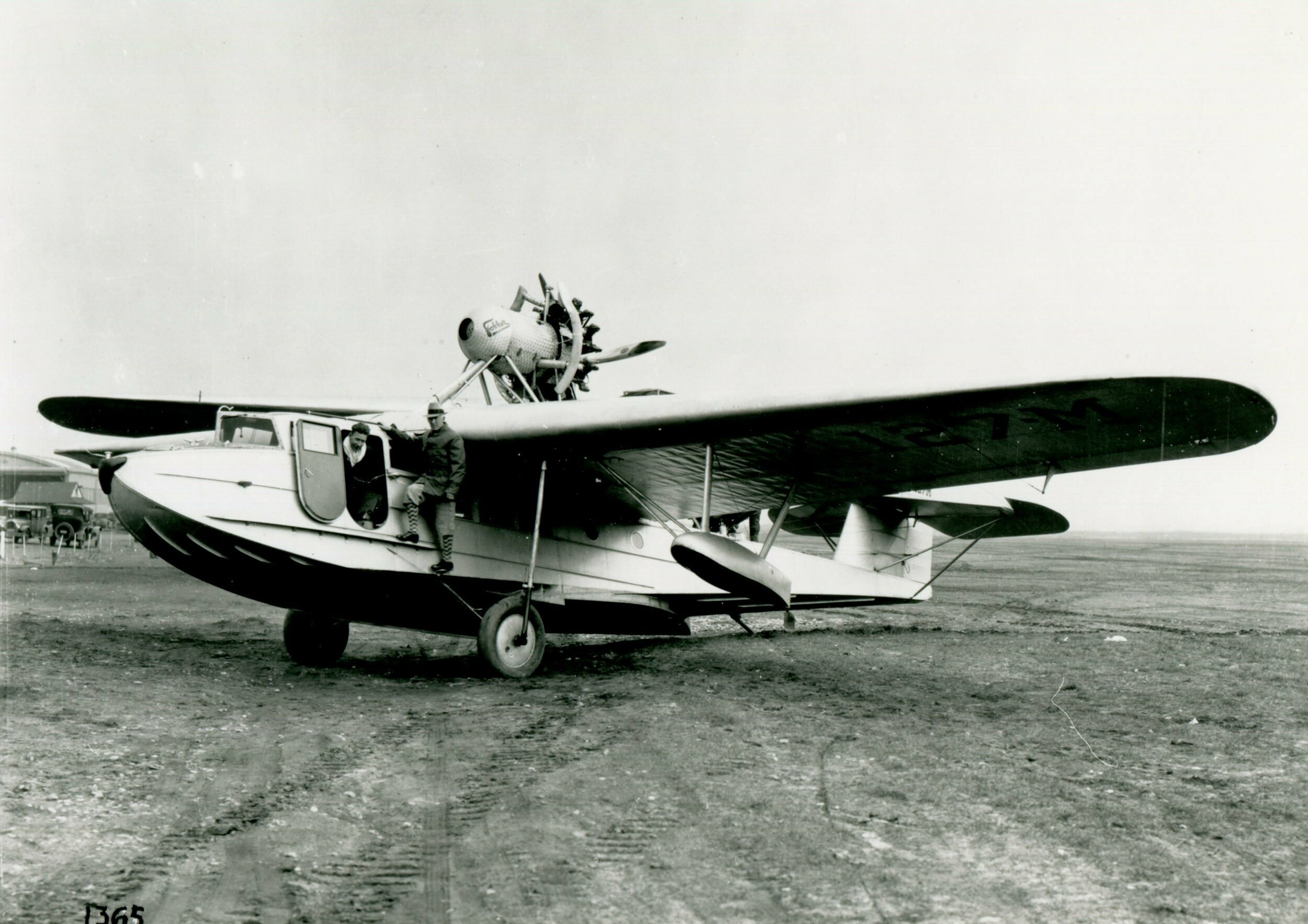

General information
- Type: transport flying boat
- Manufacturer: Fokker Aircraft Corporation of America
- Designer: Alfred Gassner
- Number built: 6

History
- First flight: 1928

The Fokker F-11 was a luxury flying boat produced as an 'air yacht' in the United States in the late 1920s. Technically the aircraft was the Fokker Aircraft Corporation of America's Model 9. It was sold in North America as the Fokker F-11 and was offered in Europe as the Fokker B.IV. By the time the first six aircraft had been constructed, it was already evident that the design was not going to sell well. A few were sold, two to notable multi-millionaires; Harold Vanderbilt and Garfield Wood each purchasing one. One was bought by Air Ferries in San Francisco. The F-11A cost $40,000 but the price was slashed to $32,500 as the depression set in during 1930. The F-11 was a commercial failure.

== Development ==
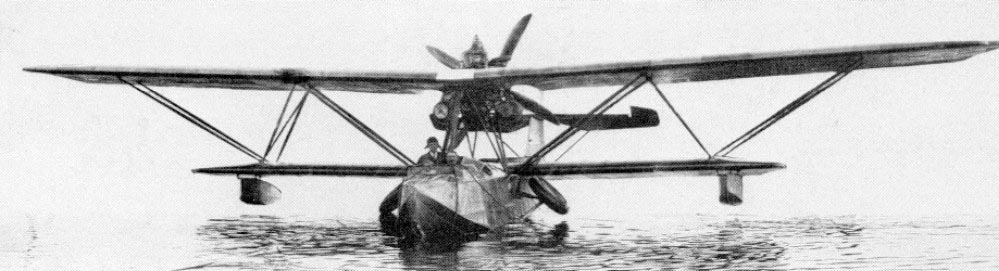
Fokker B.I

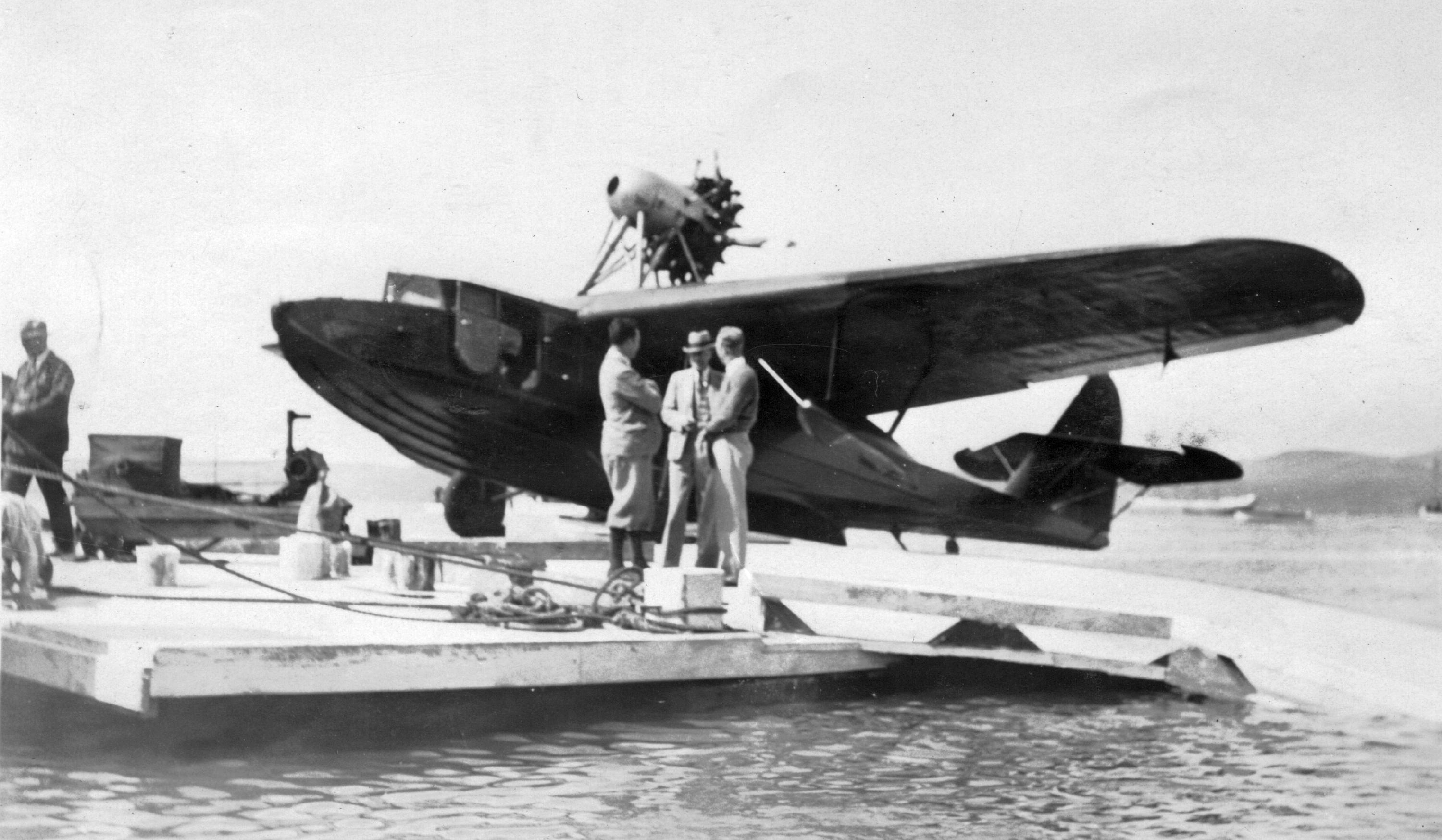
Air Ferries Fokker F-11A on San Francisco ramp

In 1922 Fokker designed the B. I flying boat, one of which was delivered to the Dutch Navy. The design was updated in 1926 as the Fokker B.III, which the Dutch Navy refused to purchase. The B.III was rebuilt as a civilian passenger plane, the B.IIIc. When that airplane failed to sell Anthony Fokker had it sent to his American subsidiary, Fokker Aircraft Corporation of America. The intent was to use the B.IIIc as a pattern for an amphibious biplane to be manufactured in the USA. The B.IIIc eventually did sell. When Harold Vanderbilt's custom-built Kirkham Air Yacht was destroyed in a hangar fire he quickly needed a new air yacht, so he purchased the B.IIIc which was replaced by the prototype F-11 when it became available.

Fokker Aircraft Corporation of America decided to redesign the aircraft extensively and convert it to a monoplane configuration by mating a redesigned fuselage to the wings of the Fokker Universal. That decision required Fokker Aircraft Corporation of America Chief Engineer Albert Gassner to create a new aircraft. Both the fuselage and the wing were so extensively redesigned that they no longer bore much resemblance to their B.III and Fokker Universal origins. The production F-11A had a high mounted Fokker F.14 wing. The pusher engine nacelle with a 525-horsepower Pratt & Whitney Wasp was strut mounted atop the wing. (Note: Peter Bowers asserts the F-14 used the wing for the F-11.) The prototype F-11, which first flew in 1928, was an amphibian with a retractable combination sponson/landing gear. It was the only F-11 Amphibian so equipped. The prototype was converted into a flying boat with wing-mounted floats like the F-11As. The production machine was the F-11A which had the F-14s wooden wing and a 525 hp Wright R-1750D Cyclone engine. Because Fokker Aircraft Corporation of America lacked the facilities to produce the duralumin fuselages, Fokker America arranged to have the hulls constructed in the Netherlands. Initially, 20 were ordered but only 6 were completed and delivered to North America.

The Fokker F-11A was a single-engined monoplane flying boat with a duralumin hull and wooden wing.

== Operational history ==
The "Air Yacht" was the invention of Grover Loening, who wished to sell his Model 23 cabin flying boat as a luxury sport and business airplane for wealthy men. His Loening Model 23 was a success with the second being bought by Vincent Astor and the third by Harold Vanderbilt. Flying had already become part of the life of the sporting upper class. As with other yachts there was considerable rivalry to have the best. Harold Vanderbilt, later an F-11 owner, once had a custom-built Air Yacht. (Note: After the F-11 Harold Vanderbilt owned a Douglas Dolphin and a Sikorsky S-43.) What success the F-11 had was in large part due to its use by two millionaires. Gar Wood's Fokker F-11 Air Yacht led a "Great Lakes Cruise Survey", which beyond swells was attended by three reporters.

F-11 c/n 901 NC7887 – Originally flown with the retractable combination sponson-landing gear. Later the sponson-landing gear was removed and wing floats were installed and c/n 901 became a flying boat. The F-11 was originally equipped with the Super Universal wing and slightly shorter fuselage. The dimensions of the F-11 were

- Span: 50 ft 7 3/4 in;
- Length: 42 ft 11 in;
- Area: 370 ft^{2}.

The F-11 was modified to F-11A standards and sold to Harold Vanderbilt to replace the lone B.IIIc which had been destroyed in a hangar fire during March 1928. NC7887 was destroyed in a hurricane during September 1938.

F-11A and F-10C c/n 902 NC148H – NX148H was retained by Fokker, later General Aviation, with civil registration 148H; then changed to NC148H. The letter N need only be used on airplane registrations if they operated outside the United States. This airplane was later converted to a twin-engined F-11C with a Fokker F-32 engine installation in an attempt to meet a U.S. Coast Guard twin-engine flying boat specification. It was used for test installations various engine configurations. Flying Yacht c/n 902 was scrapped at the end of 1931.

Fokker F-11A c/n 903 NC151H – NC151H c/n 903: registration was 151H. Most likely never completed or flown. It might have been parted out for repairs of c/n 901 which was damaged in a taxi incident during September 1929. Final disposition unknown.

F-11AHB c/n 904 NC127M – Given the Civil registration 127M, later NC127M, it was sold to famed boat racing and speedboat magnate Garfield Wood in 1929. Gar Wood replaced it with a Fairchild 91 in 1936. Eventual disposition unknown.

Fokker F-11A c/n 905 NC843W – Fokker F-11AHB The two F-11AHB were equipped with 575 hp Pratt & Whitney R-1860 Hornet B engines. NC844W was bailed to the Army for tests as YC-16 at Wright Field during 1930. The YC-16 was deemed not acceptable for service use. A photo exists of NC843W with Western Air Express markings, there is no airline record of the aircraft. The F-11AHB was the next to last American built Fokker ever registered in the United States. Final disposition unknown.

Fokker F-11AHB c/n 906, NC339N, CF-AUV – The last F-11 was completed in 1930. Sold and registered as 339H, later NC339N. It was operated by Air Ferries, San Francisco. Sold to a Canadian and registered as CF-AUW. It crashed when it hit a tree on takeoff from McDames Lake, BC on June 28, 1935. A large portion of the hull was recovered in 1978-1979 and put on display at the former Aviodome museum at Schiphol airport. When that museum closed it was transferred to the Aviodome museum at Lelystad airport where it has been stored.

At least two F-11 hulls were not shipped from Holland to Fokker Aircraft Company of America. One was seen at an aviation exposition at The Hague in 1937. The final disposition is unknown. Another was given to the Technical University at Delft. It was scrapped some time in the 1960s.

== Variants ==
- F-11 or B.IV - prototype with B.III hull, Universal wing and Pratt & Whitney Wasp engine, later replaced with Wright Cyclone (1 built)
- F-11A or B.IVa - production version with redesigned fuselage and wing and Wright Cyclone engine (5 built)
- F-11C - Modified with by the replacement of the single engine with a nacelle containing two engines in a push-pull arrangement.
- F-11AHB - F-11A modified with 275 h.p. Pratt & Whitney Hornet and seating increased to eight

== Operators ==
United States

- United States Army Air Corps
- Air Ferries

Canada

- W. Strong

== Specifications (F-11A) ==
General characteristics

- Crew: Two pilots
- Capacity: 6 passengers
- Length: 45 ft 0 in (13.72 m)
- Wingspan: 59 ft 0 in (17.98 m)
- Height: 13 ft 0 in (3.96 m)
- Wing area: 550 sq ft (51 m^{2})
- Empty weight: 4,500 lb (2,041 kg)
- Gross weight: 6,845 lb (3,105 kg)
- Powerplant: 1 × Wright R-1750D Cyclone 9 , 525 hp (392 kW)

Performance

- Maximum speed: 112 mph (180 km/h, 97 kn)
- Cruise speed: 95 mph (153 km/h, 83 kn)
- Range: 400 mi (640 km, 350 nmi)
