= Bonney Gull =

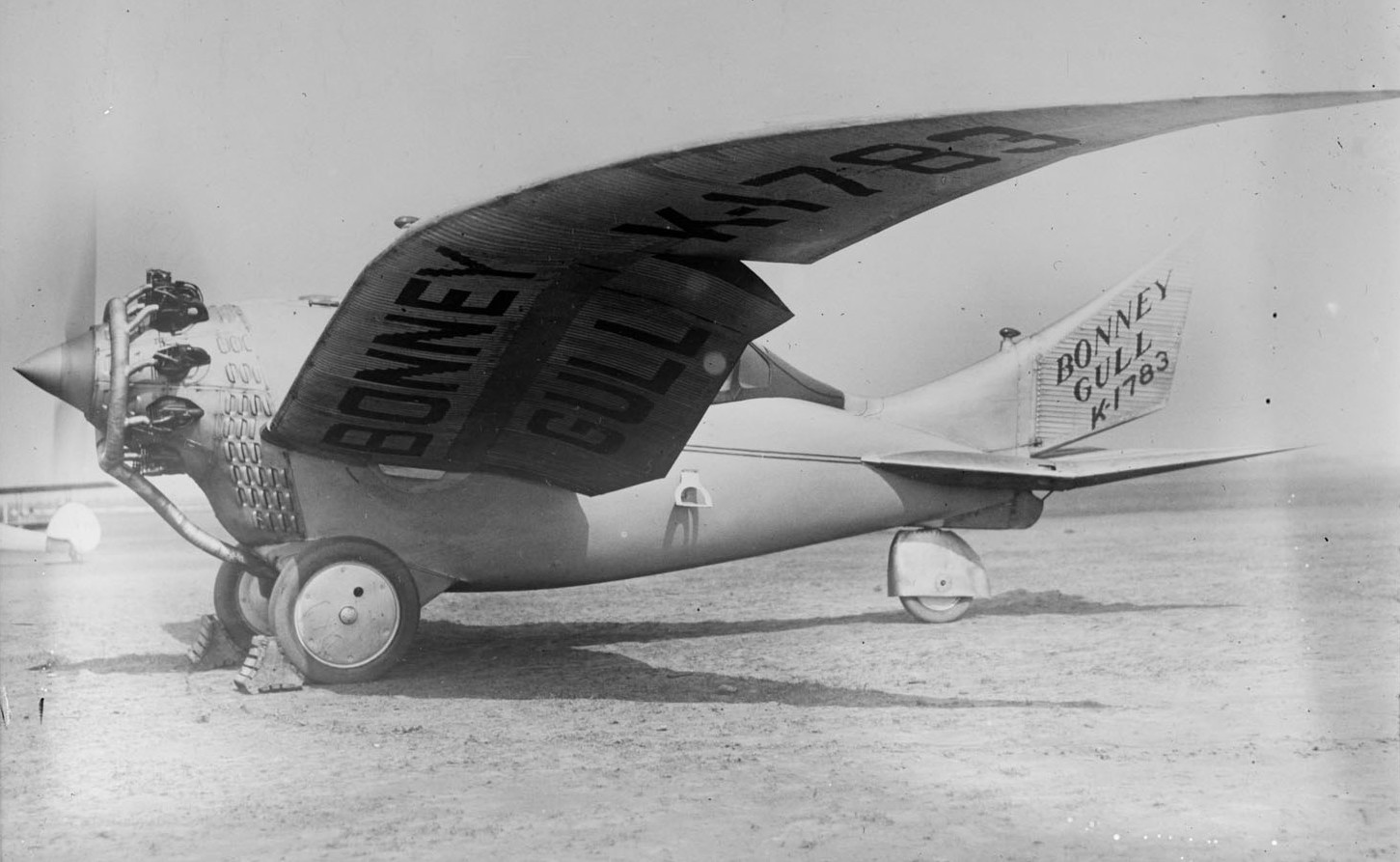

General information
- Type: Experimental aircraft
- National origin: United States
- Designer: Leonard Warden Bonney
- Status: Crashed on first flight
- Number built: 1

History
- Introduction date: 1928
- First flight: 4 May 1928

The Bonney Gull was an experimental aircraft that used variable incidence wings with bird-like shapes.

== Development ==
Leonard Warden Bonney was an early aviator, who flew with the Wright Exhibition Team as early as 1910. An experienced aviator with service in the First World War, Bonney set out to develop a plane with more efficient wings and controls than contemporary aircraft. Noting the gull's two to one lift to weight ratio, he set about molding gull wings for their shape. Construction took place over the course of five years. The ideas were tested in MIT and the Daniel Guggenheim School of Aeronautics wind tunnels.

== Design ==
A 1928 issue of Time magazine described the unusual aircraft:

It was fat in body with graceful curving wings. Bonney followed the bird principle, abandoned the aileron, or balancing contrivance which airplane designers have always considered an essential feature of stability in the air. His plane had new features: an expanding and contracting tail, like a blackbird's, for varying loads; variable camber in the wings, so that they could flatten out like a gull's when flying level; a varying angle of incidence to its wings, so that they could turn sideways into the wind on landing...

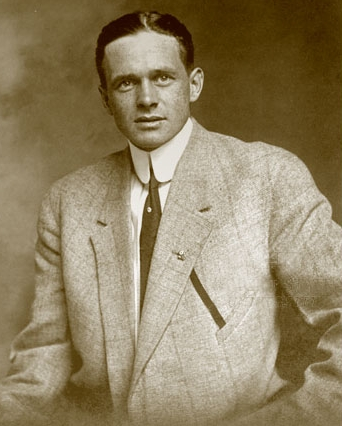
Leonard Warden Bonney, circa 1911

The Gull was assembled at the Kirkham facility in Garden City, New York and Mitchel Field. It used conventional landing gear, a mid-wing arrangement, corrugated aluminum skins, and a radial engine. The cockpit featured a large streamlined greenhouse bubble with two seats. The large tailwheel was steerable and fully faired. The tail used small vertical stabilizers, with large elevators that could be swept back in flight. The aircraft profile was not unusual for the era with the exception of the highly tapered and swept back wings with a large dihedral and large tapered tail surfaces.

Some features seemed far-fetched, but were actually ahead of their time. The wings mounted flush with the aircraft, but had a mechanism which allowed them to rotate in angle of incidence, as well as fold rearward from ten degrees of sweep to forty five degrees for braking and storage. These features were incorporated on future carrier aircraft such as the Fairey Firefly for storage rather than braking and flight control. Variable incidence mechanisms are used commonly to trim tail surfaces, however some aircraft such as the Vought F-8 Crusader have deployed the concept in practical use. The variable sweep mechanism can be seen on some high-speed aircraft such as the General Dynamics F-111 Aardvark to expand their flight envelope. Bonney used differential sweep for roll control.

== Operational history ==
Bonney was unable to find a willing test pilot and chose to fly the aircraft himself. He performed a test hop, damaging the landing gear once. On 4 May 1928 Bonney took up another aircraft on a flight, then announced he would test fly the Gull that day. Bonney was killed during the maiden flight when the aircraft nosedived into the ground from about 50 feet of altitude, seconds after taking off from Curtiss Field on Long Island. Pathé News was onsite to film the first flight. The newsreel shows the aircraft experiencing a roll to the left which was corrected, and a single oscillation in pitch before nosing straight down into the ground tossing out Bonney. Bonney was taken to Mineola Hospital where he died.

== Specifications (Bonney Gull) ==
Data from Long Island Aircraft Manufacturers

General characteristics

- Crew: 1
- Powerplant: 1 × Kirkham 9 cylinder Radial, 180 hp (130 kW)

== See also ==
Related development

- Kirkham Air Yacht - A gull winged aircraft built by Kirkham
