= Leonard Warden Bonney =

American aviator (1884–1928)

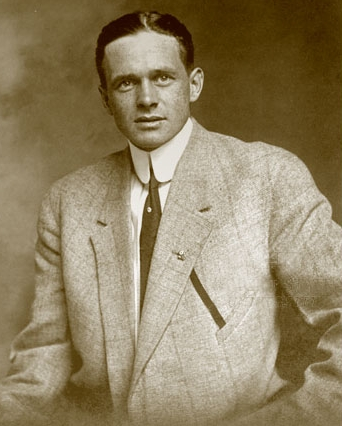
- Born: December 4, 1884; Wellington, Ohio
- Died: May 4, 1928 (aged 43); Mineola, New York
- Cause of death: Aircrash
- Other name: Warden Leonard Bonney
- Spouse: Flora MacDonald (m. 1925–1928)

Leonard Warden Bonney (December 4, 1884 – May 4, 1928) was a pioneering aviator with the Wright brothers.

== Biography ==
Bonney was born in Wellington, Ohio, on December 4, 1884, possibly as Warden Leonard Bonney. He attended Oberlin College. In 1910 and 1911, he flew for the Wright Exhibition Team and was the 47th licensed pilot. In 1912 he worked for the Sloan Airplane Company, and in 1913 he was a test pilot for the Amas Airplane Company, in Washington, D.C., and by 1918 he was the general manager for the company. In 1914 and 1915 he was a military aviator for the Mexican government under General Carranza. During World War I he became an Army instructor at Garden City, New York, and a naval instructor at Smith's Point, New York.

In 1925 Bonney married Flora MacDonald. The same year he started designing and constructing in Garden City, New York, a novel plane with duraluminum folding gull-like wings and a side-by-side cockpit. He called the plane the Bonney Gull.

A 1928 issue of Time magazine described the unusual aircraft:

It was fat in body with graceful curving wings. Bonney followed the bird principle, abandoned the aileron, or balancing contrivance which airplane designers have always considered an essential feature of stability in the air. His plane had new features: an expanding and contracting tail, like a blackbird's, for varying loads; variable camber in the wings, so that they could flatten out like a gull's when flying level; a varying angle of incidence to its wings, so that they could turn sideways into the wind on landing...

Bonney was killed on May 4, 1928, during the maiden flight of the Bonney Gull when the aircraft nosedived into the ground from about 50 feet (15 m) of altitude, seconds after taking off from Curtiss Field, Long Island.
