= Fokker B.I (1922) =

B.I and B.III
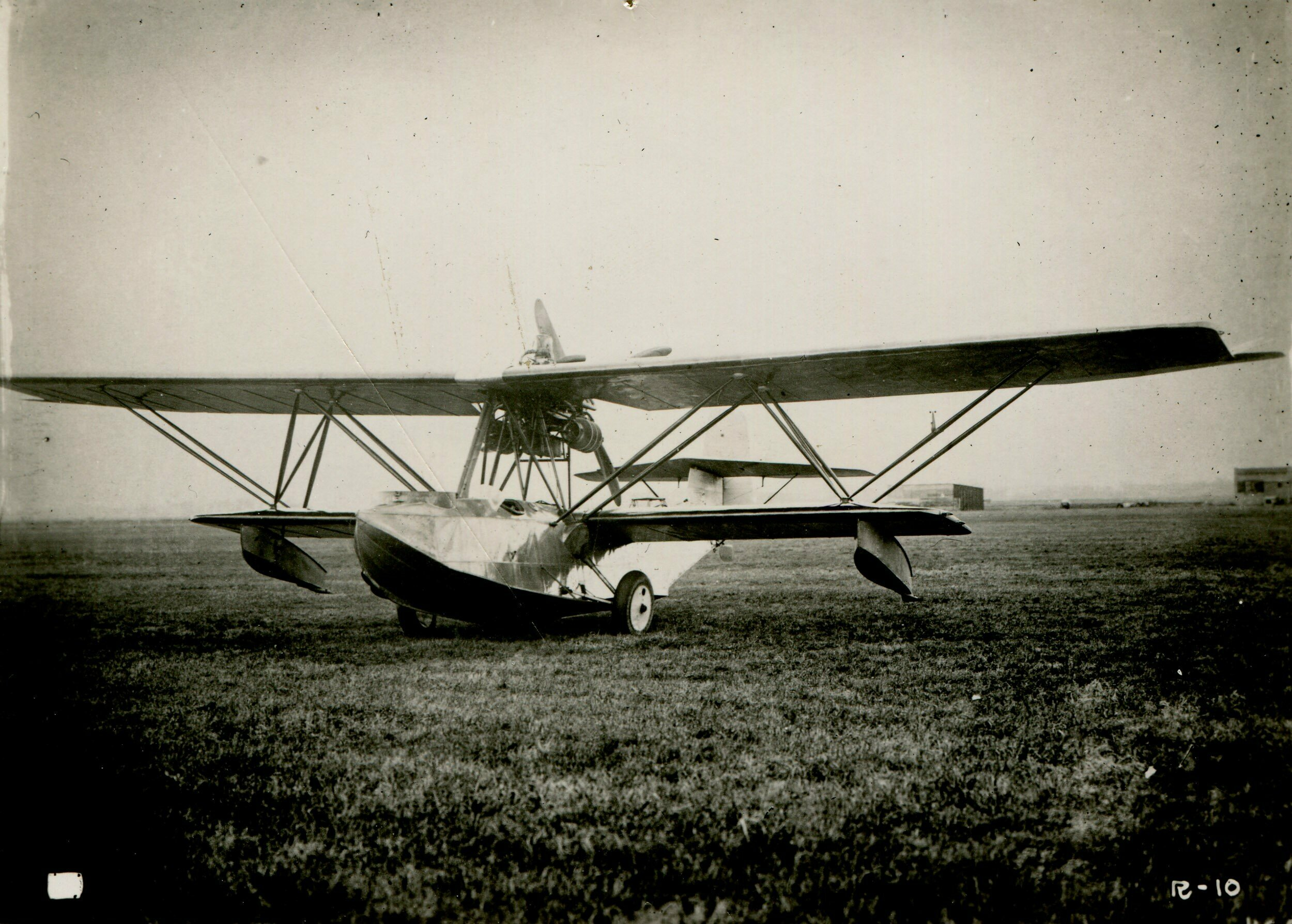
- Fokker B.I

General information
- Type: Reconnaissance flying boat
- Manufacturer: Fokker
- Designer: Walter Rethel
- Number built: 2

History
- First flight: 1922

The Fokker B.I was a reconnaissance flying boat built in the Netherlands in 1922. The B.I was followed by an improved version, the B.III in 1926. It was a conventional biplane flying boat design, with staggered sesquiplane wings braced by struts arranged as a Warren truss. The engine was mounted pusher-wise on the top wing. The duralumin hull featured three open cockpits - one at the nose for a gunner, one in front of the lower wing for the pilot and engineer and one behind the wings for another gunner. The B.I was amphibious, equipped with main undercarriage that folded back along the hull, but this feature was omitted in the B.III. The B.I was flown in the Dutch East Indies by the Naval Air Service for a number of years, and although it gave good service, no further examples were ordered from Fokker.

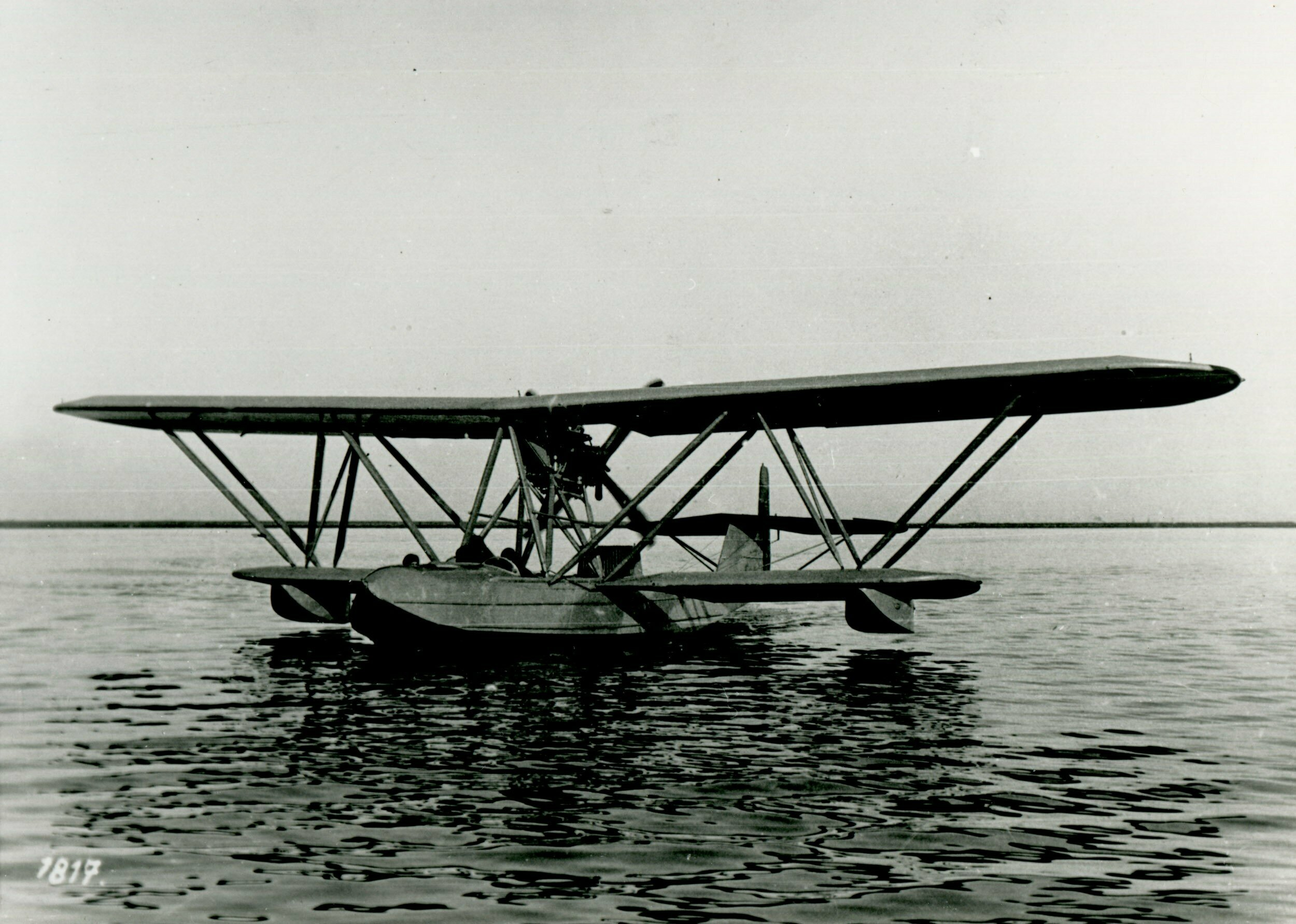
The improved B.III

The manufacturer hoped that the modernised and improved B.III flying boat would stimulate renewed interest in the type. When the aircraft failed to sell to the Dutch Navy Fokker had a passenger cabin installed in the hope of attracting commercial customers. This was not to be, however, and the renamed B.IIIC remained unsold. It was eventually sent to Fokker's US subsidiary where the hull design was to serve as the basis for the Fokker F.11's hull. The modifications necessary were so extreme as to require the design of a new hull for the F. 11. The aircraft finally found a buyer in Harold Vanderbilt.

== Specifications (B.III) ==
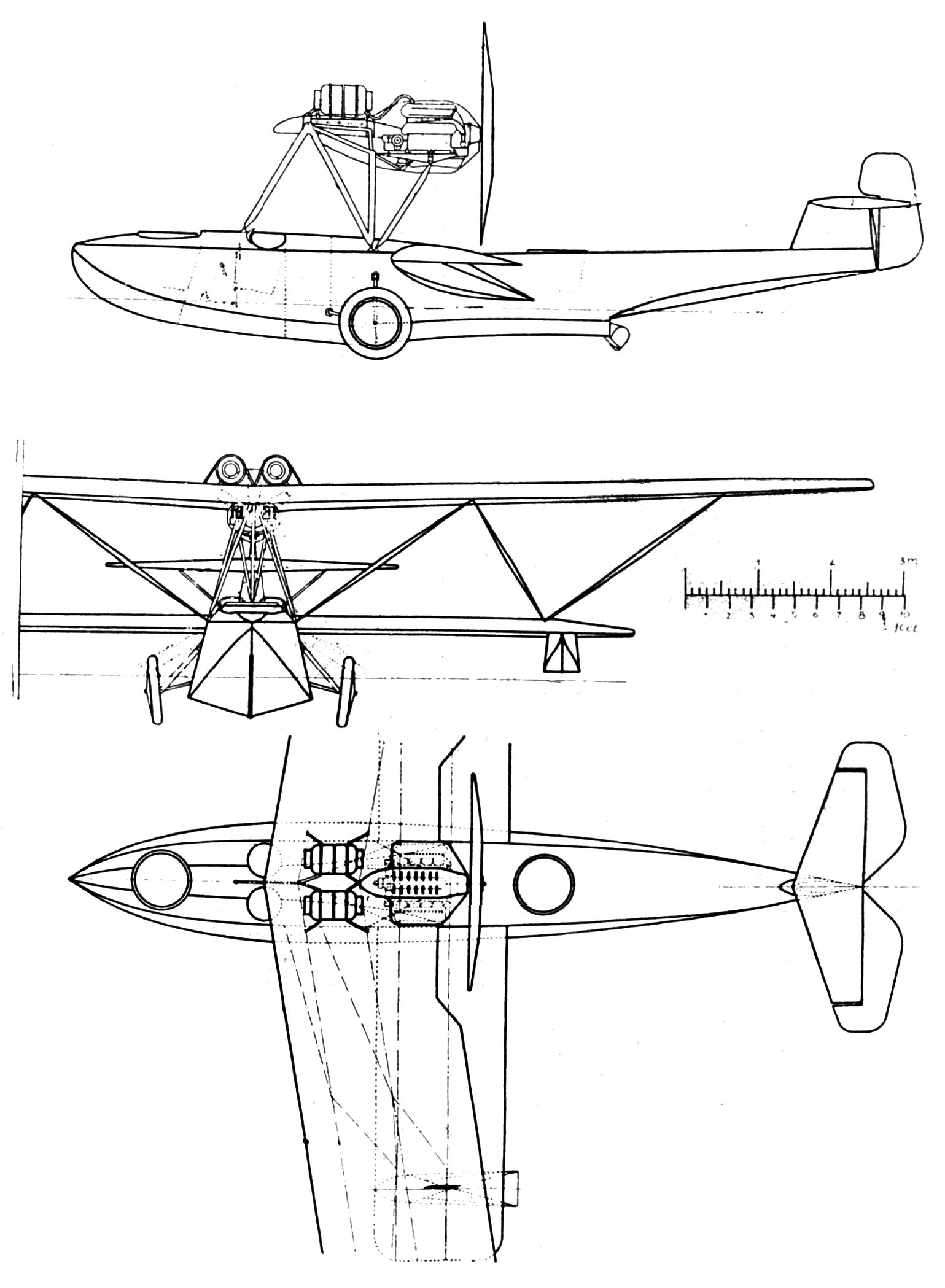
Fokker B.I 3-view drawing from L'Aéronautique December,1922

General characteristics

- Crew: Four - Pilot, engineer, two gunners
- Length: 11.85 m (38 ft 10 in)
- Wingspan: 18.00 m (59 ft 1 in)
- Height: 3.95 m (13 ft 0 in)
- Wing area: 59.0 m^{2} (603 sq ft)
- Empty weight: 1,870 kg (4,120 lb)
- Gross weight: 3,070 kg (6,770 lb)
- Powerplant: 1 × Napier Lion piston engine , 336 kW (450 hp)

Performance

- Maximum speed: 180 km/h (112 mph, 97 kn)
- Service ceiling: 3,700 m (12,100 ft)
- Rate of climb: 3.0 m/s (600 ft/min)

Armament

- 1 × machine gun on flexible mount in bow position
- 1 × machine gun on flexible mount in dorsal position

== Bibliography ==
- Taylor, Michael J. H. (1989). Jane's Encyclopedia of Aviation. London: Studio Editions. p. 402.
- "The New Fokker Amphibian Flying Boat". Flight. Vol. XIV, no. 730. 21 December 1922. pp. 772–773.
- "The Fokker B.III". Flight. Vol. XIX, no. 946. 10 February 1927. p. 67.
