= Ralph Johnstone =

American aviator (1880–1910)

Ralph Greenley Johnstone
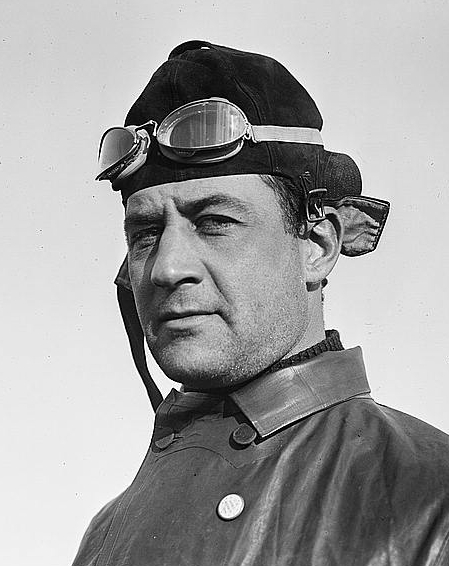
- Born: Ralph Greenley Johnstone; September 18, 1880; Parsons, Kansas, U.S
- Died: November 17, 1910 (aged 30); Denver, Colorado, U.S.
- Cause of death: Aircrash

Ralph Greenley Johnstone (September 18, 1880 – November 17, 1910) was the first American person to die while piloting an airplane that crashed. He and Archibald Hoxsey were known as the "heavenly twins" for their attempts to break altitude records.

== Biography ==
Johnstone was born on September 18, 1880, in Parsons, Kansas.

Johnstone started as a vaudeville trick bicycle rider who performed a midair forward somersault. He became a Wright exhibition team pilot. On August 17, 1910, he survived a crash at Asbury Park, New Jersey.

On October 27, 1910, the International Aviation Tournament was held at the Belmont Park racetrack in Elmont, New York. The meet offered $3,750 for the highest altitude, another $1,000 for a world record and a $5,000 bonus for exceeding 10,000 feet (3,048 metres). Johnstone set a new American flight altitude record of 8,471 feet (2,582 metres). During the flight, a gust of wind forced him to fly backwards, and he landed near Artist Lake in Middle Island, New York.

Johnstone died on November 17, 1910, in Denver, Colorado, in an air crash. Johnstone's Wright Model B was still fairly new. Surviving photos of the wreckage show the parts/components still gleaming with factory fresh paint. Johnstone had damaged the wing of the plane on a previous landing and superficially repaired the wing. Not properly repaired, the wing collapsed during his next high-altitude flight, and Johnstone plunged to his death in full view of the crowd.

== Personal life ==
Johnstone was married and had a daughter, Ethel, and a son, Ralph. He was a friend of Archibald Hoxsey and rival Curtiss team member Eugene Ely.

== Legacy ==
A New York State Historic Plaque at Artist Lake along New York State Route 25 in Middle Island commemorates Johnstone's landing at the lake.

== See also ==
- List of fatalities from aviation accidents
