= Archibald Hoxsey =

American aviator (1884–1910)

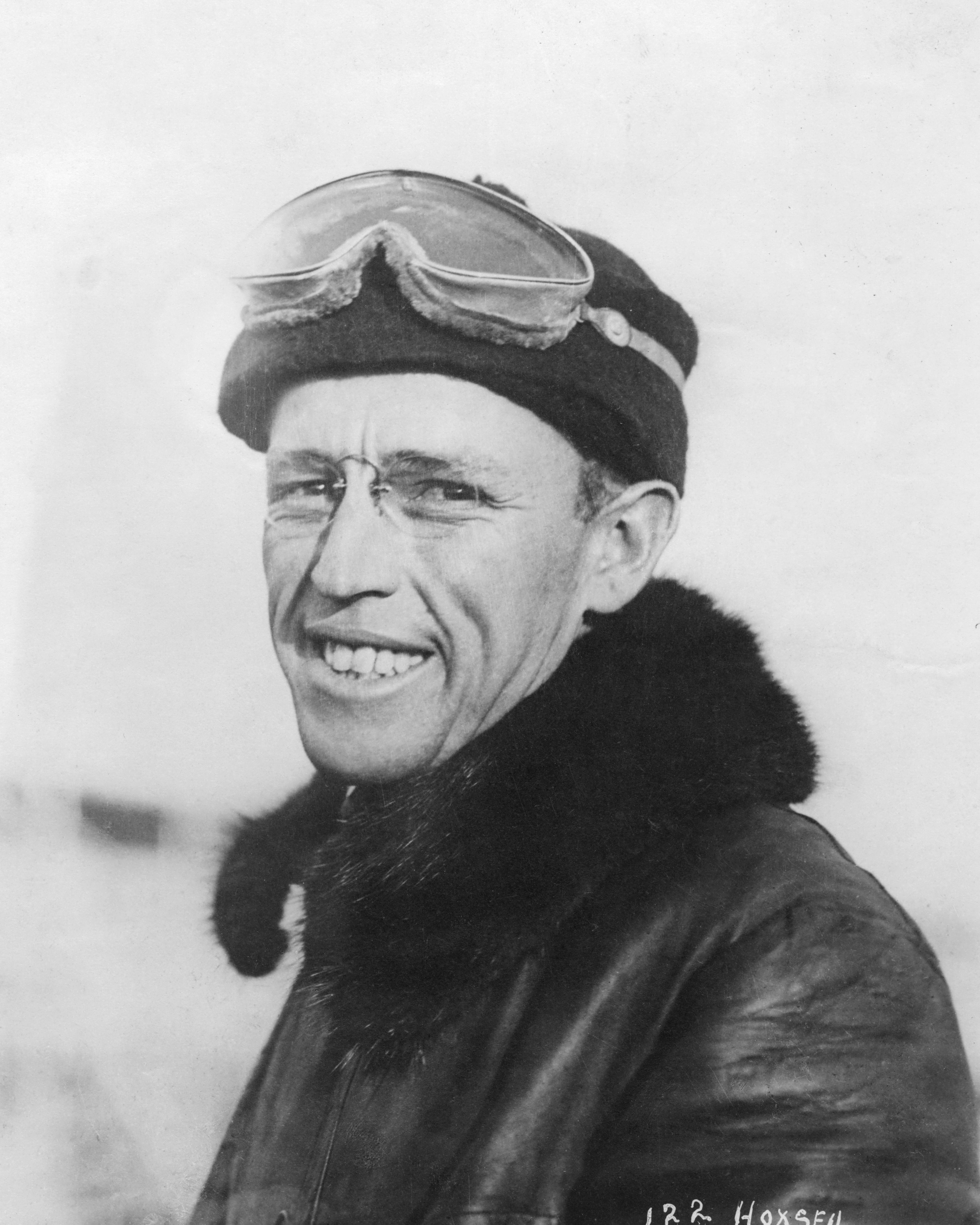
- Born: October 15, 1884; Staunton, Illinois, U.S.
- Died: December 31, 1910 (aged 26); Los Angeles, California, U.S.
- Cause of death: Air crash
- Known for: Flight altitude record Flight with Theodore Roosevelt

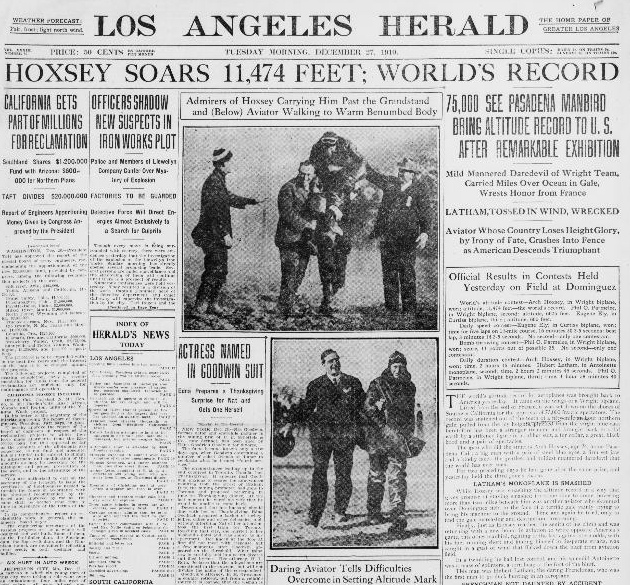
Front page of Los Angeles Herald on December 27, 1910, after Hoxsey set airplane altitude record. He died three days later.

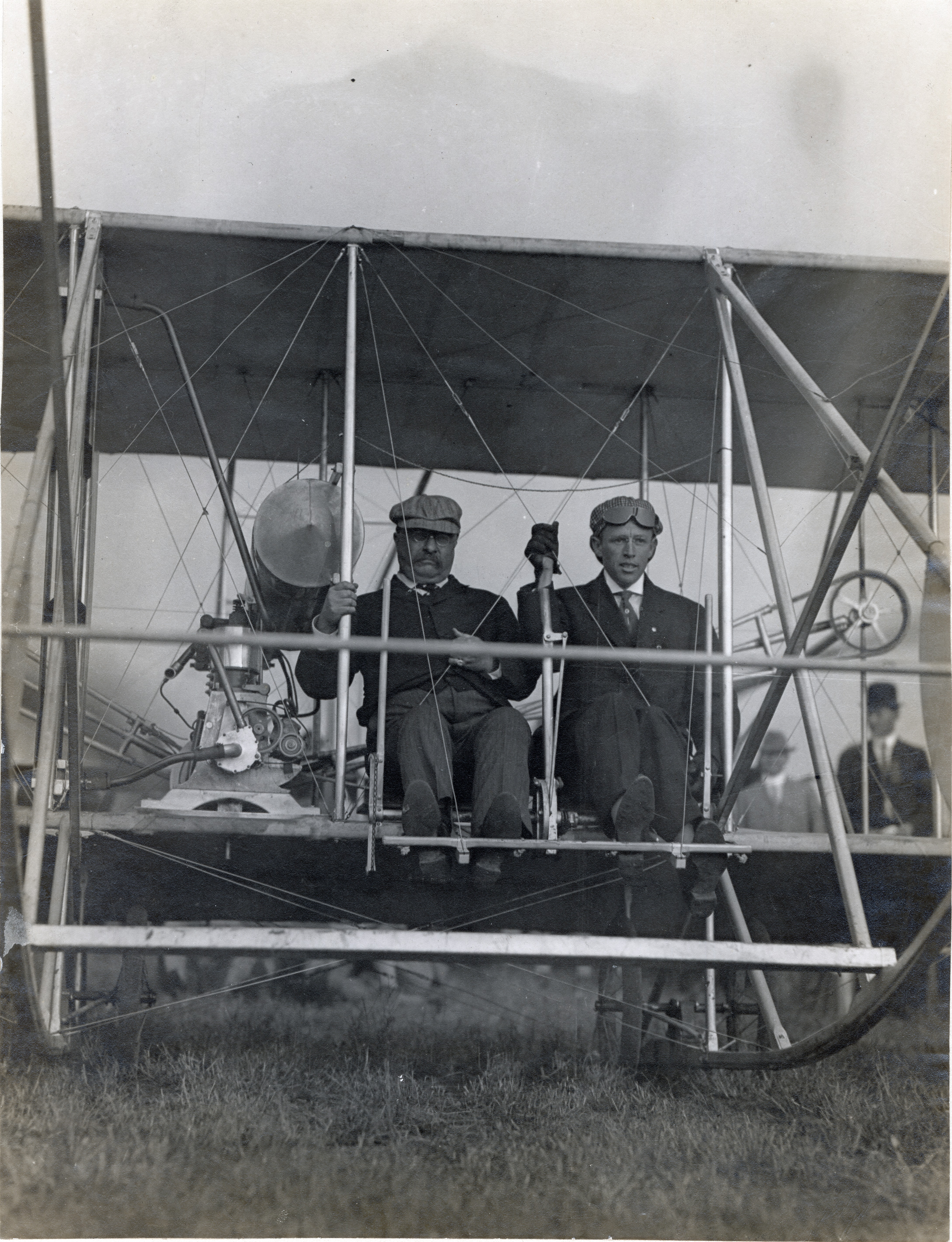
Hoxsey and Teddy Roosevelt before their flight. October 11, 1910.

Archibald Hoxsey (October 15, 1884 – December 31, 1910) was an American aviator who worked for the Wright brothers.

== Biography ==
Hoxsey was born in Staunton, Illinois, on October 15, 1884. He moved with his parents to Pasadena, California. In his early twenties he worked as an auto mechanic and chauffeur. By 1909-1910 his mechanical ability led to a meeting with the Wright Brothers. In March 1910 the Wright brothers opened a flight school in Montgomery, Alabama, and Hoxsey was a teacher there. There he became the first pilot to fly at night.

On October 11, 1910, at Kinloch Field in St. Louis he took Theodore Roosevelt up in an airplane.

Because of their dueling altitude record attempts, he and Ralph Johnstone were nicknamed the "heavenly twins".

On December 26, 1910, Hoxsey set a flight altitude record of 11,474 feet (3,497 m).

Hoxsey was to participate in the 22nd annual Tournament of Roses Parade, on January 2, 1911, sitting upon a float replica of the plane in which he set the flight altitude record.

== Death ==
Hoxsey died on December 31, 1910, in Los Angeles, California, after crashing from 7,000 ft (2,100 m) while trying to set a new altitude record. The Wright Brothers paid for the funeral. Contemporary sources, including Roy Knabenshue, blamed his death on "mountain sickness".

He is buried in Woodlawn Cemetery, Atkinson, Nebraska, in the same grave as his father, Archibald Hoxsey Sr.
