= J. Clifford Turpin =

James Clifford Turpin
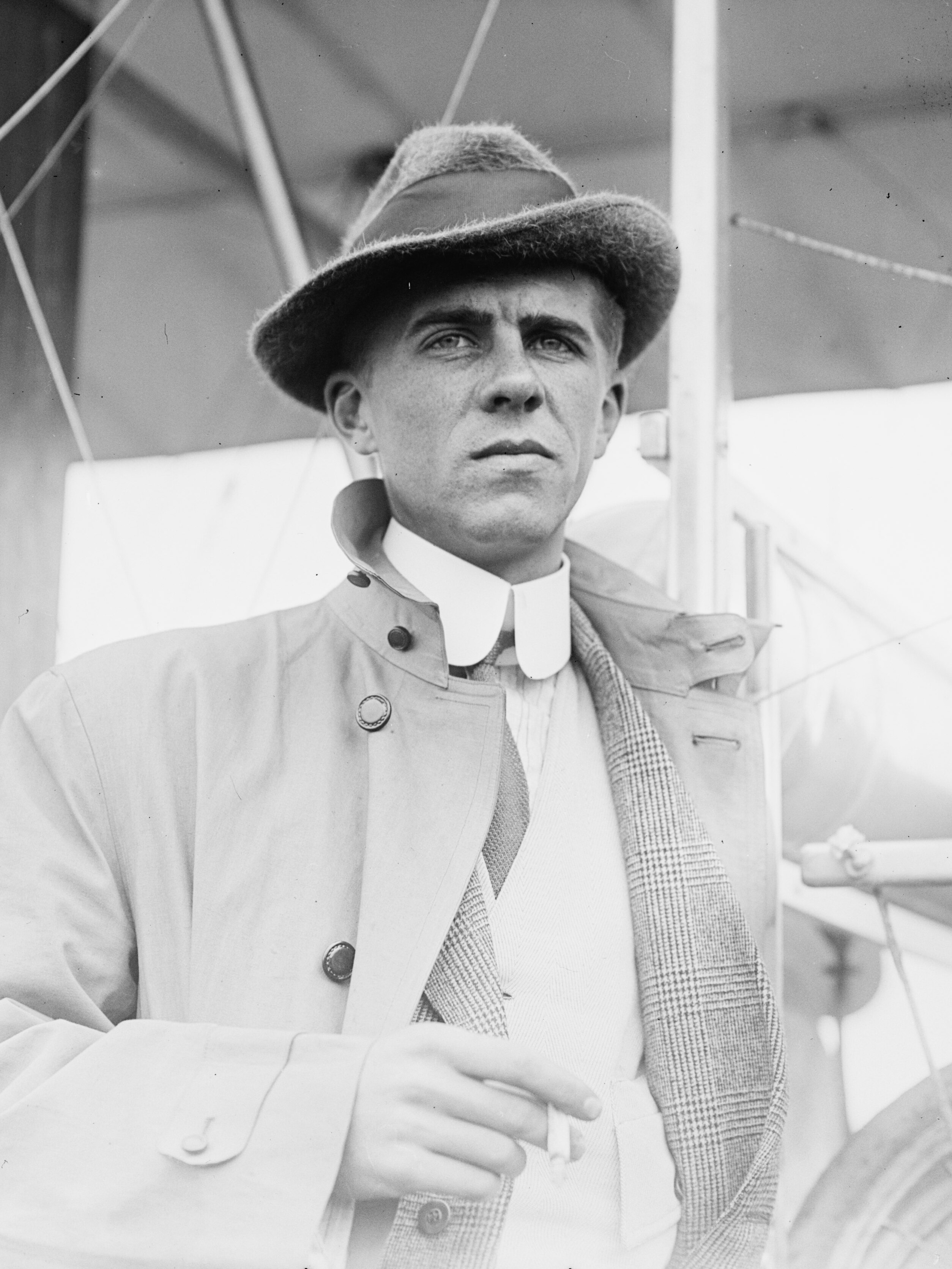
- Born: 6 May 1886
- Died: January 1966 (aged 79)
- Resting place: Lothrop Hill Cemetery, Barnstable, Massachusetts
- Education: Purdue University
- Occupation: Pilot till 1912
- Employer: Wright Exhibition team
- Known for: Aviation pioneer and exhibition flyer

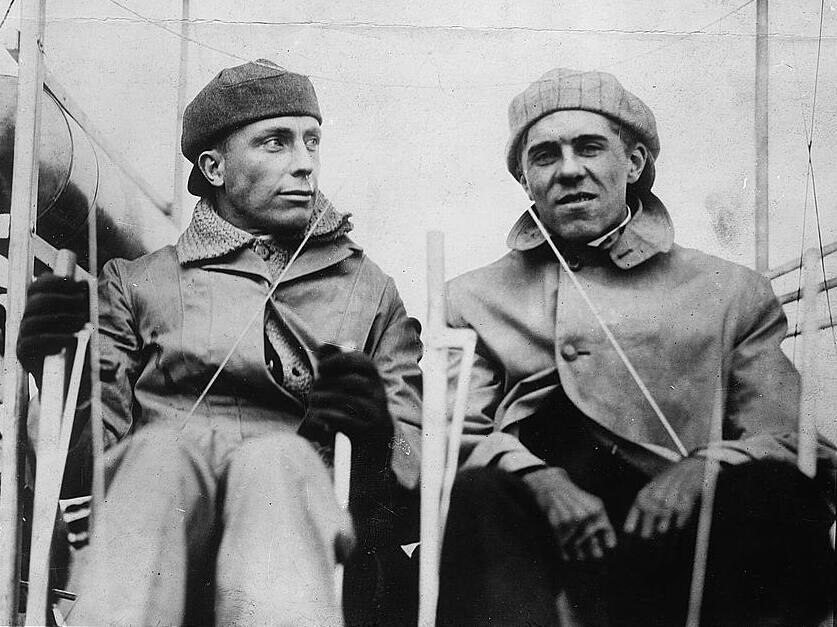
Turpin (right) and Lieutenant John Rodgers

James Clifford Turpin (6 May 1886 – January 1966) was a pioneer aviator with the Wright Exhibition Team.

== Biography ==
He was born on May 6, 1886.

He attended Purdue University, the first graduate (class of 1908) to receive a pilot's license. Turpin joined the Wright Exhibition team in 1910, flying demonstrations across the country. The group was disbanded in 1911. In May 1912, Turpin rented a Wright Model C for his own exhibitions. While flying his Fowler-Gage biplane in a Seattle stadium, Turpin clipped an iron railing whilst avoiding a cameraman, and veered into a grandstand, killing two spectators. After the death of his flying partner, Phil Parmalee, in Yakima, Washington, Turpin quit flying.

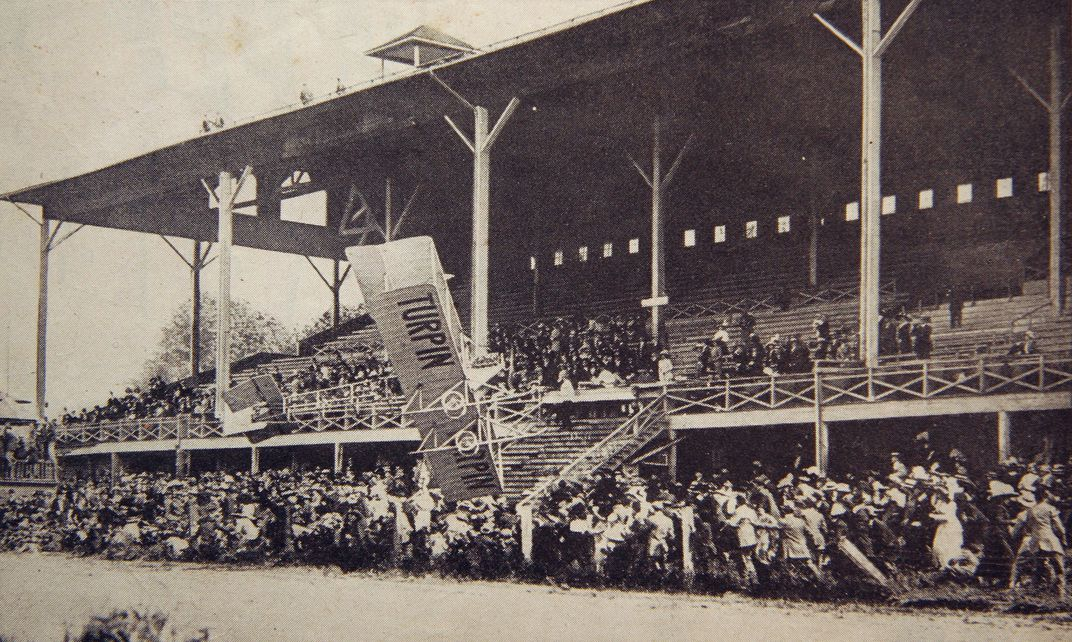
Turpin about to crash his Fowler-Gage biplane at Meadows field, Seattle, which killed two spectators

He died in January 1966. He was buried in Lothrop Hill Cemetery in Barnstable, Massachusetts. Turpin reputedly was the father of one daughter.
