= Wright Exhibition Team =

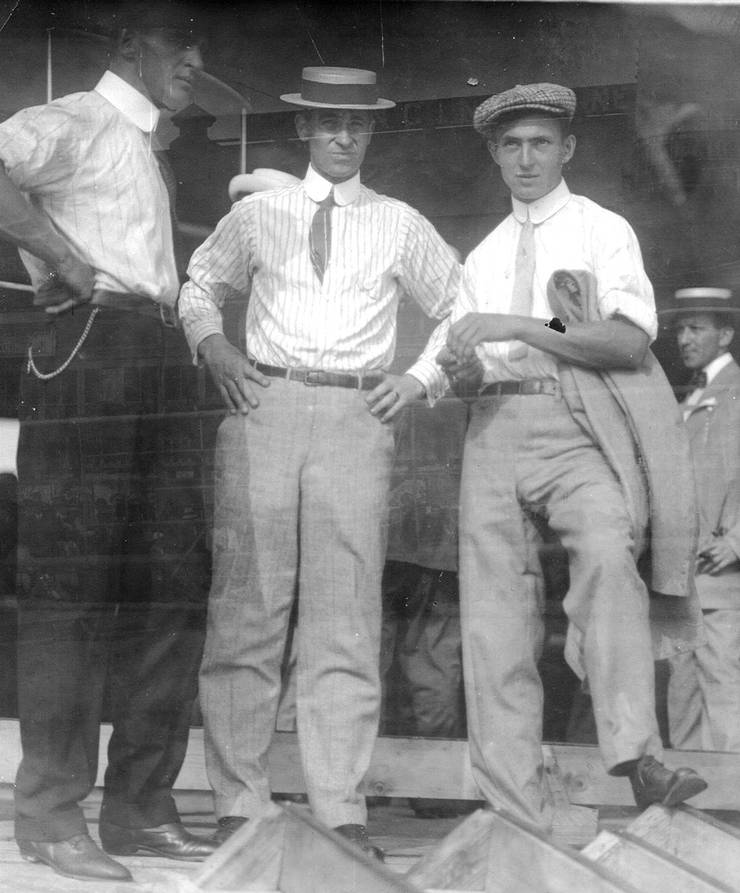
From left to right are: Frank Trenholm Coffyn; A. Roy Knabenshue; and Walter Brookins in Atlantic City in 1910

The Wright Exhibition Team was a group of early aviators trained by the Wright brothers at Wright Flying School in Montgomery, Alabama in March 1910.

== History ==
The group was formed in 1910 at the suggestion of balloonist Augustus Roy Knabenshue. The Wright Company built about 100 Wright Model B at the time, and only few of other models.

The team made its first public appearance on June 13, 1910 at the Indianapolis Motor Speedway.

The team performed aerial shows and set records for altitude (4939 feet) and endurance.

Pilots were paid $20 per week and $50 a day when flying. By August there were five separate teams flying at one time with $186,000 in receipts. Ralph Johnstone was the first to be killed.

After attempting another altitude record over Denver's Overland Park in November, Johnstone put his plane into Walter Richard Brookins' 'spiral dip' dive, and he never recovered. The plane plummeted to the ground, and Johnstone was crushed.

A month later, on New Year's Eve, 1910, Arch Hoxsey was killed in an identical crash. Although the team had lost its star fliers, newer pilots trained by Welsh joined the team and continued performing around the country at 25 locations.

Troubled by the deaths of the pilots, the Wrights disbanded the group in November 1911.

== Members ==
- Leonard Warden Bonney (1884–1928) †
- Walter Richard Brookins (1889–1953)
- Frank Trenholm Coffyn (1878–1960)
- Howard Gill (1883–1912) †
- Archibald Hoxsey (1884–1910) ‡
- Ralph Johnstone (1880/?1886–1910) ‡
- Augustus Roy Knabenshue (1875–1960) managed the team.
- Duval La Chapelle (1869-1932)
- Philip Orin Parmelee (1887–1912) †
- James Clifford Turpin (1886–1966) pilot, engineer
- Arthur L. Welsh (1875 or 1881–1912) †, Welsh was killed in a crash while demonstrating a Wright model C airplane for the U.S. Army in 1912.
- Spencer Crane – mechanic
- James Davis – mechanic

‡ Died in crashes performing for the Wright team
† Died in crashes after leaving the team

== Timeline ==
- 1910 Indianapolis Motor Speedway on June 13
- 1910 October – Walter Brookins crashes the Wright Baby Grand at Belmont Park in New York.
- 1910 November – Ralph Johnstone dies at Denver's Overland park.
- 1910 December – Walter Brookins performs at Dominguez Field, Los Angeles.
- 1910 Death of Arch Hoxsey on December 31
- 1911 May – Walter Brookins leaves the flight team.
- 1911 Chicago, Illinois August 12–30, Grant Park
- 1911 November – The Wrights release the team, keeping Welsh on as a test pilot.
