= Douglas Dolphin =

1930 multi-role flying boat family

Dolphin
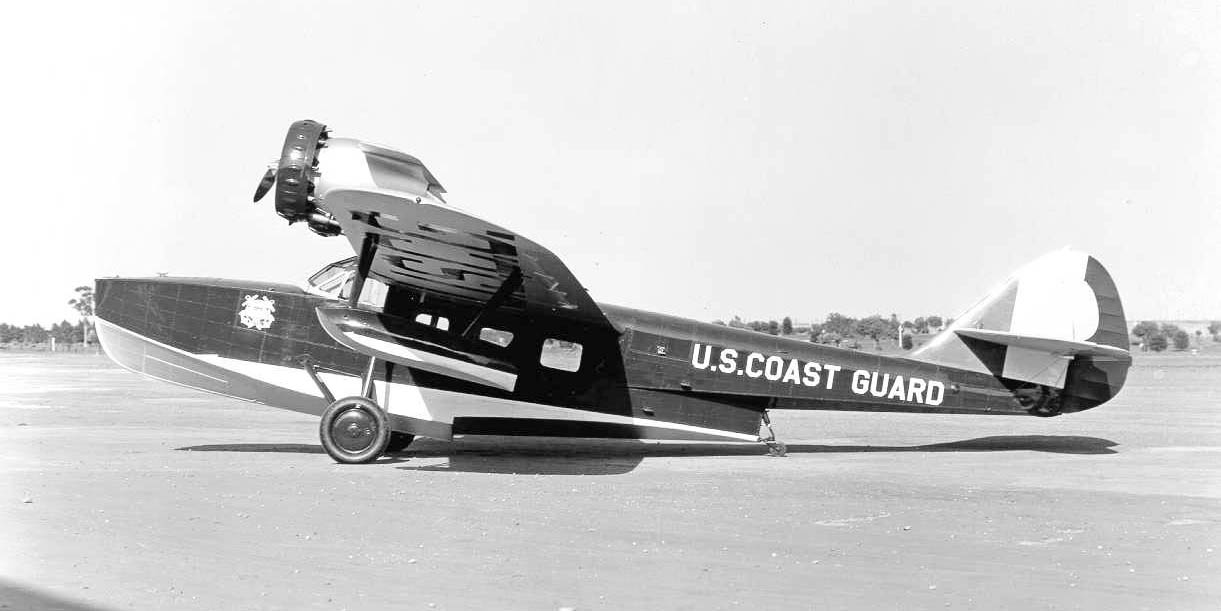
- U.S. Coast Guard RD-2 in June, 1932

General information
- Type: Multirole flying boat
- National origin: United States
- Manufacturer: Douglas Aircraft Company
- Primary users: United States Navy United States Coast Guard
- Number built: 58

History
- Introduction date: 1931
- First flight: July 1930 (Sinbad)

The Douglas Dolphin is an American amphibious flying boat monoplane. While only 58 were built, they served a wide variety of roles including private air yacht, airliner, military transport, and search and rescue.

== Design and development ==
The Dolphin originated in 1930 as the "Sinbad," a pure flying boat without wheels. The Sinbad was intended as a luxurious flying yacht. Undaunted by the lack of demand, Douglas improved the Sinbad in 1931 so that it was amphibious, and could land on water or land. The improved aircraft was named "Dolphin", however this did not represent the end of development, as many detail improvements were made, including an increase in the length of over a foot and changes made to the empennage, engine nacelles and wings. The Great Depression had curtailed demand for such extravagance as a "flying yacht", but Douglas managed to interest the United States Coast Guard who not only bought the Sinbad, but 12 Dolphins.

== Operational history ==
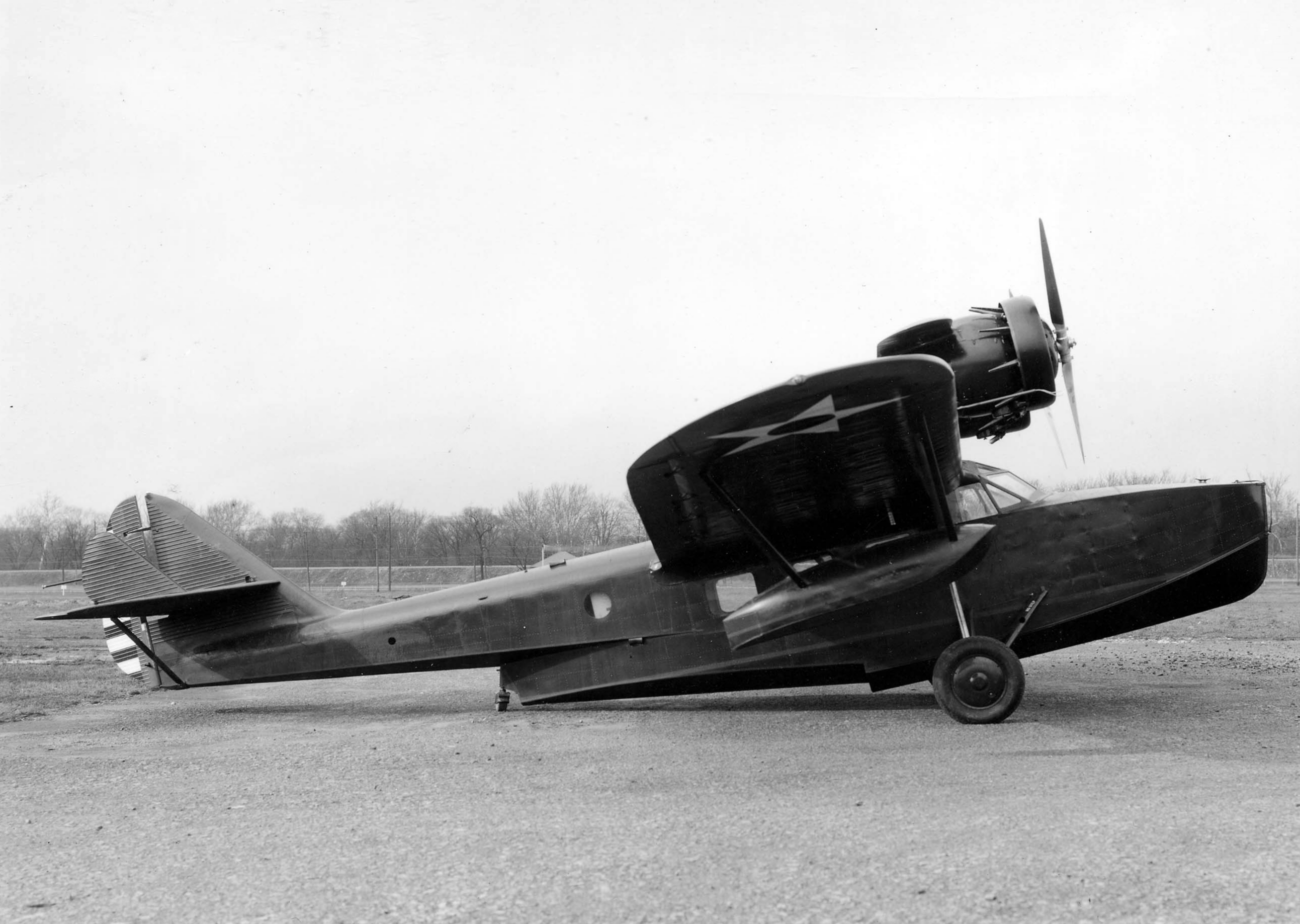
A Y1C-21

The first two were purchased by Wilmington-Catalina Airline to fly passengers between Los Angeles and Santa Catalina Island, becoming the first successful Douglas airliners. Subsequent examples were ordered by the United States Navy and U.S. Coast Guard for use as transports and search and rescue craft. The U.S. Army Air Corps ordered several under the designations C-21, C-26, and C-29. Many were eventually ordered for their original purpose as luxury transports. Owners included William Boeing, the founder of the Boeing Company, and Philip K. Wrigley, the son of the founder of the Wm. Wrigley Jr. Company. William K. Vanderbilt bought two with custom interiors for use from the Vanderbilt yacht Alva as flying tenders.

One was procured by the U.S. Navy as a transport for President Franklin D. Roosevelt. Although never used by Roosevelt, this was the first aircraft procured to provide transportation for the President of the United States.

In 1933, landing in heavy seas, the USCG RD-4 undertook some rescues of merchant sailors at sea, feats that made spectacular news reports, enthralling the American public.

== Variants ==
Data from:McDonnell Douglas Aircraft since 1920 Vol.1

=== Manufacturer Models ===
Douglas Sinbad
The original prototype built as a flying boat, intended to be a luxurious flying yacht, first flown in July 1930. No orders were received for the Sinbad which was eventually bought by the U.S. Coast Guard.

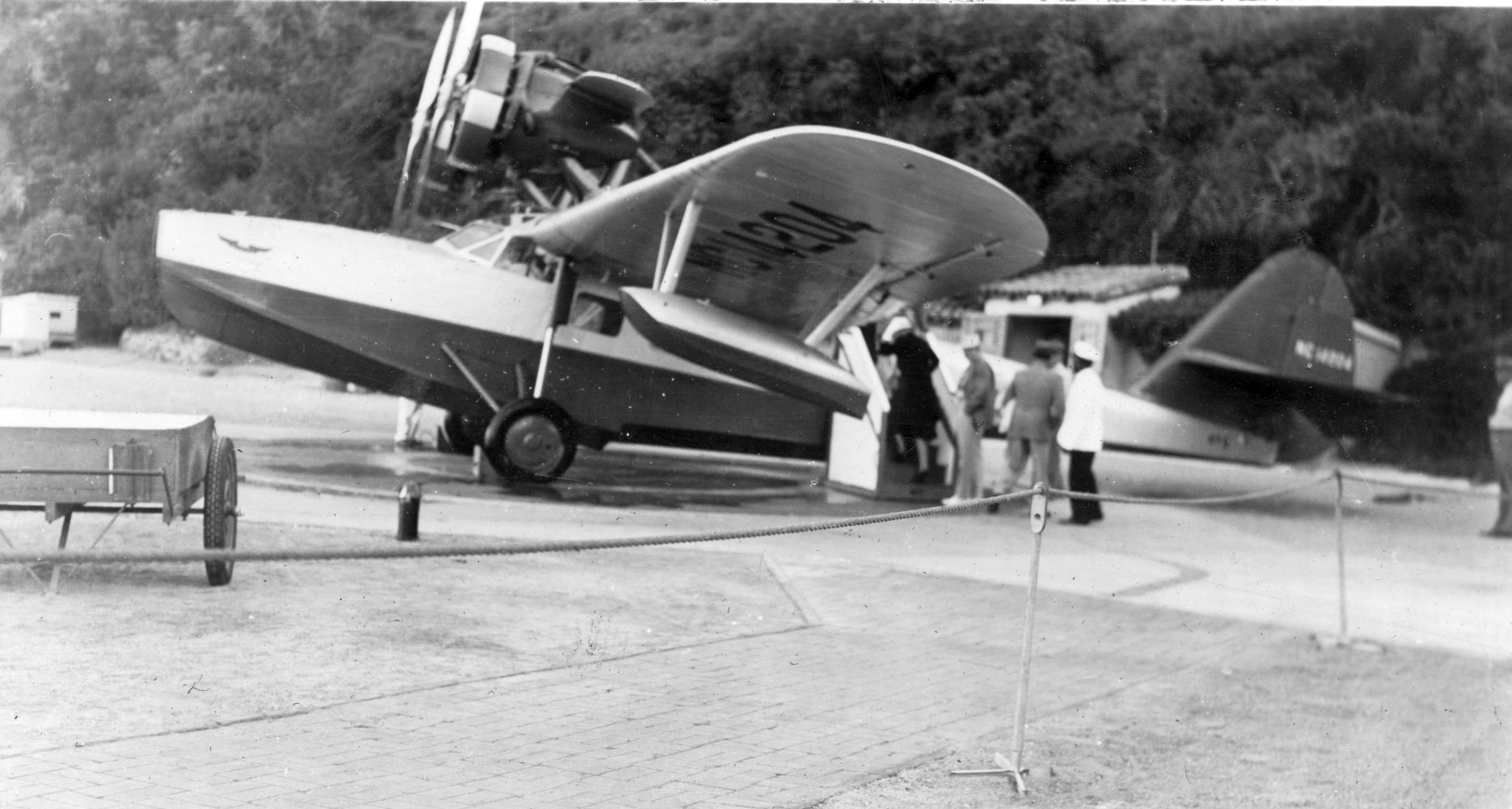
Wilmington-Catalina Airline Dolphin at Hamilton Cove Seaplane Base on Santa Catalina Island

Dolphin Model 1
The initial two Dolphins built for Wilmington-Catalina Airline as six-seat airliners.
Dolphin Model 1 Special
The Model 1s redesignated after modification to seat eight passengers.
Dolphin Model 3
The third commercial Dolphin built as a luxury transport named Lesgo with seats for two crew and four passengers for Powel Crosley Jr., powered by 2x 300 hp (224 kW) Pratt & Whitney Wasp Junior A engines. Later impressed into the RAAF as A35-3.
Dolphin 113
One aircraft named Jade Blanc V for French clothing manufacturer Armand Esders (who also owned a Bugatti Royale) similar to the RD-4, powered by 2x 550 hp (410 kW) Pratt & Whitney R-1340-S1H1 Wasp engines.
Dolphin 114
A single Dolphin built to order for Philip K. Wrigley, powered by 2x 450 hp (336 kW) Pratt & Whitney Wasp SC1 engines.
Dolphin 116
One aircraft for the Armada Argentina (Argentine Navy), powered by 2x 450 hp (336 kW) P&W R-1340-96.
Dolphin 117
One aircraft initially named Rover, bought by William E. Boeing, which ended up in CAA service and, later, Alaskan airlines service. Sole surviving example, painted in USCG markings.
Dolphin 119
Two aircraft built for Alfred Gwynne Vanderbilt Jr. and William Kissam Vanderbilt II and operated from the yacht Alva. One of the two (which is unknown) joined the RAAF as A35-2.
Dolphin 129
Two aircraft ordered by Pan American Airways for its subsidiary (at that time) China National Aviation Corporation, powered by 2x 450 hp (336 kW) Pratt & Whitney Wasp S3D1 engines. One crashed in heavy seas and the other was destroyed during or shortly after the Japanese invasion of China.

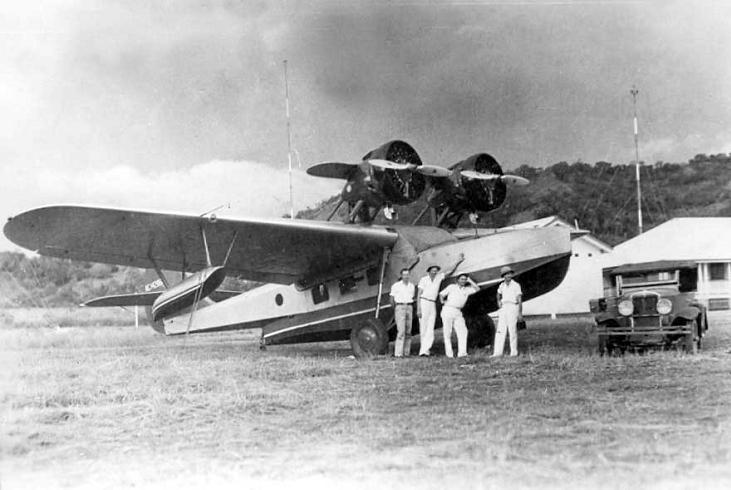
Dolphin 136 (NC14286) in New Guinea, 1939.

Dolphin 136
A single Dolphin, powered by 2x 450 hp (336 kW) Pratt & Whitney Wasp Junior SB engines, ordered by Standard Oil and later impressed by the RAAF as A35-1.

=== US Treasury Department ===
FP-1
Several C-21 aircraft loaned to the U.S. Treasury Department for border patrols during Prohibition.
FP-2
The two Y1C-26 Dolphins during a brief attachment to the U.S. Treasury Department.
FP-2A
The designation used by those Y1C-26A aircraft that were attached to the U.S. Treasury Department.
FP-2B
The two C-29s when in use by the U.S. Treasury Department.

=== US Navy / Coast Guard ===
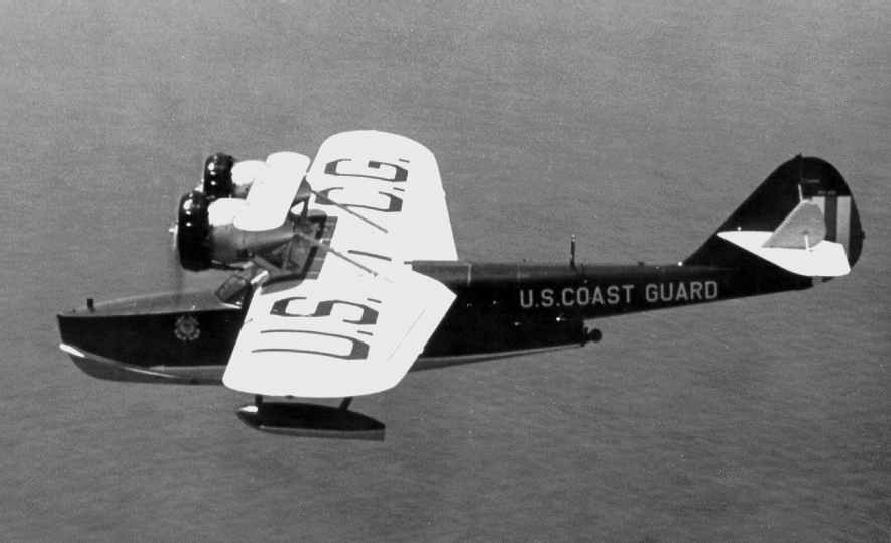
A U.S. Coast Guard RD-1.

RD-1
One aircraft, powered by 2x 435 hp (324 kW) Wright R-975E radial engines, operated by the U.S. Coast Guard.
RD-2
Four Dolphin aircraft of two distinct types. One Aircraft similar to the Y1C-21 and powered by 2x 500 hp (373 kW) Pratt & Whitney R-1340-10 engines, for the U.S. Coast Guard. Two were U.S. Navy VIP staff transports similar to the Y1C-26 powered by 2x 450 hp (336 kW) Pratt & Whitney R-1340-96 engines. The final aircraft was completed for the U.S. Navy as the first presidential aircraft, for Franklin D. Roosevelt, powered initially by 2x 410 hp (306 kW) Pratt & Whitney R-1340-1 engines and later by 2x 500 hp (373 kW) Pratt & Whitney R-1340-10 engines, seating five though it was reportedly never used by the President.
RD-3
A utility transport version of the RD-2, six of which were built for the U.S. Navy, powered by 2x 500 hp (373 kW) Pratt & Whitney R-1340-4 or by 2x 500 hp (373 kW) Pratt & Whitney R-1340-96 engines.

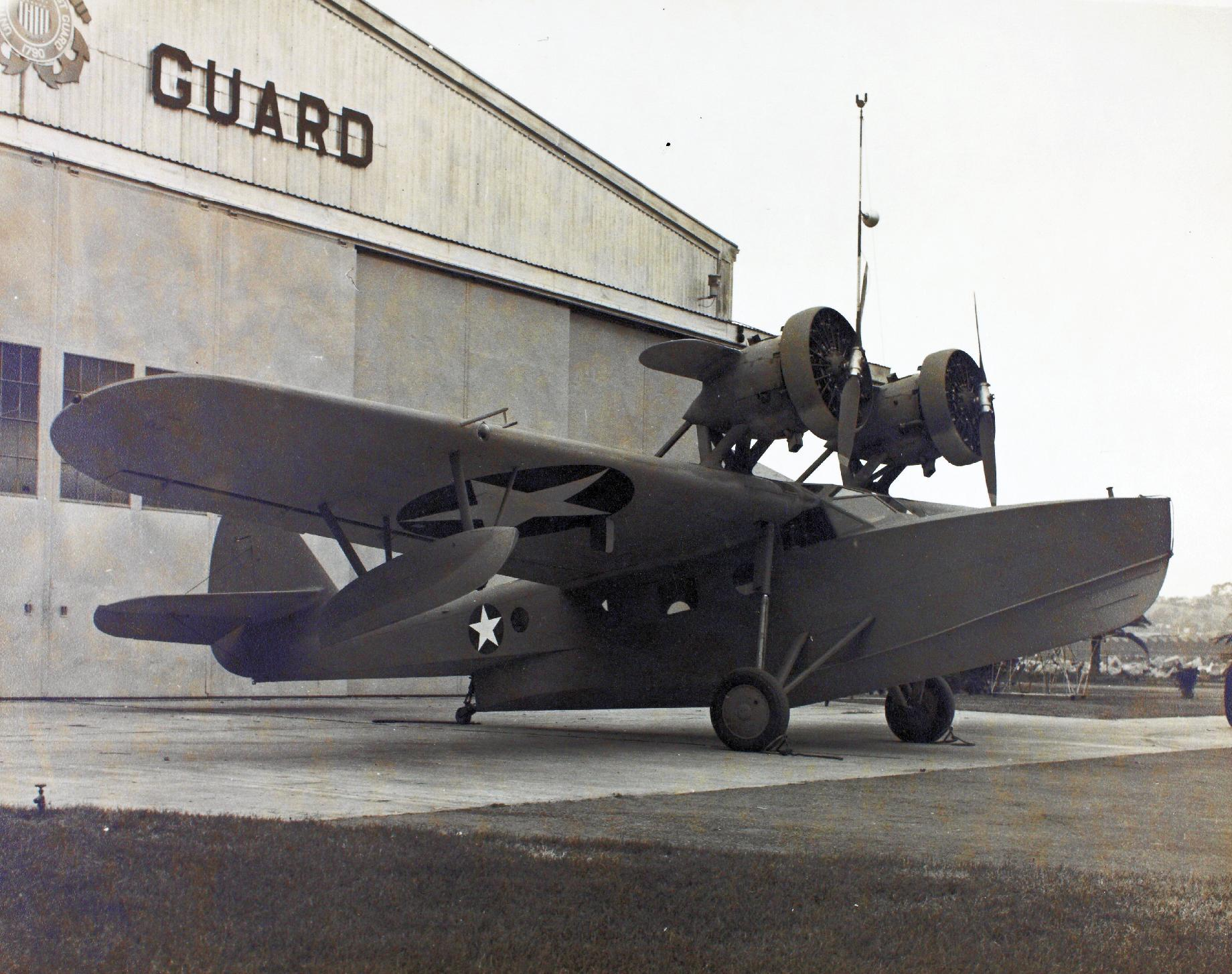
A RD-4 in World War II

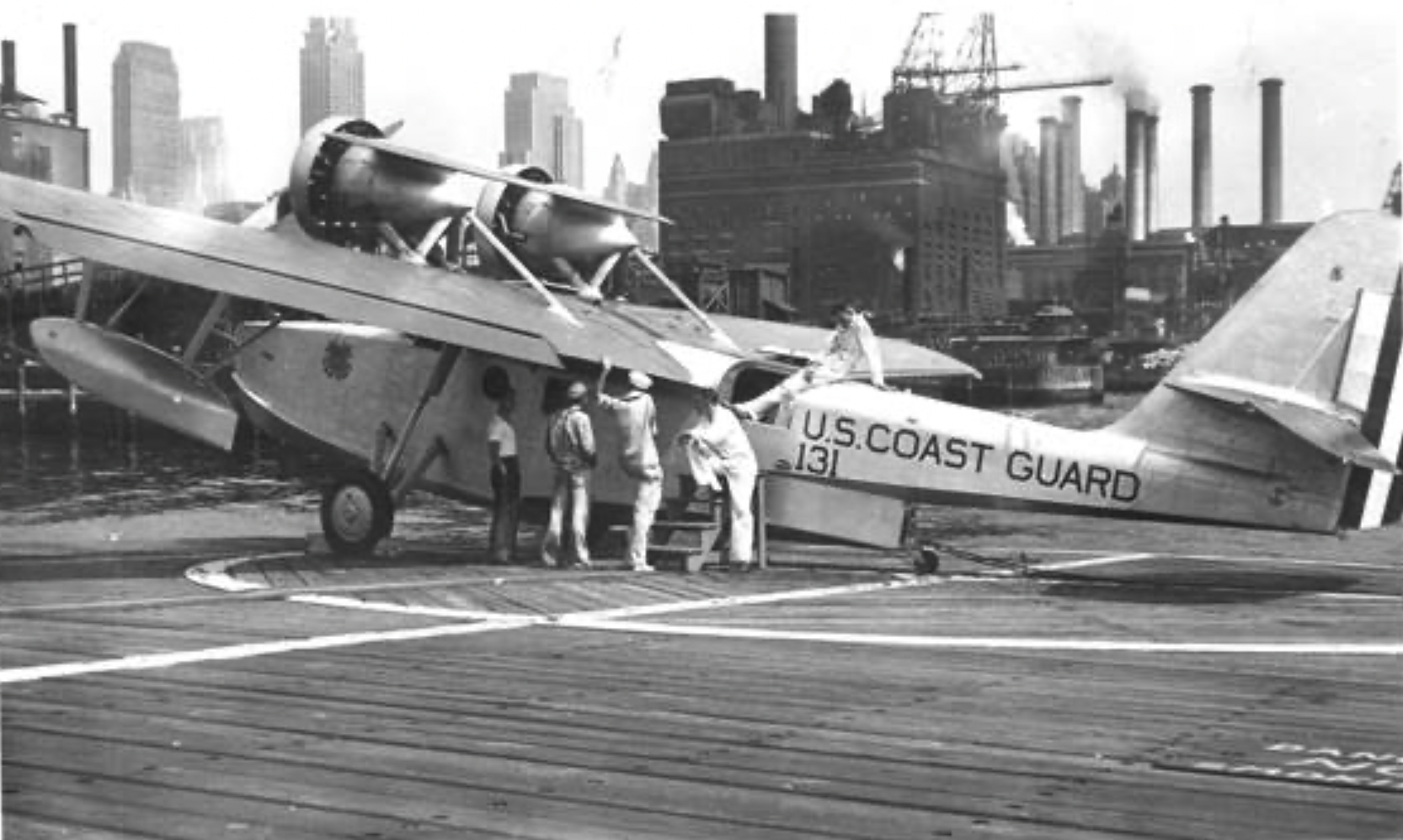
Coast Guard 131, an RD-4

RD-4
Ten aircraft for the U.S. Coast Guard, powered by 2x 420 hp (313 kW) Pratt & Whitney Wasp C1 engines. One, V-126, was destroyed on the morning of August 5th, 1941, when it likely struck a rock pinnacle on the southeastmost of the Farallon Islands near San Francisco, causing the aircraft to burst into flames. All 3 crewmen aboard were killed.

=== US Army Air Force ===
Y1C-21
Eight aircraft for the USAAS, similar to the Navy's RD-1, powered by 2× 350 hp (261 kW) Wright R-975-3 engines.
Y1C-26
Two aircraft for the USAAS with increased dimensions, fin area and fuel capacity (from180 US gal (681 L) to 240 US gal (908 L)). Powered by 2× 300 hp (224 kW) Pratt & Whitney R-985-1 engines.
Y1C-26A
Eight aircraft for the USAAS differing from the Y1C-26 only in minor details.
C-21
Y1C-21 aircraft redesignated.
C-26
Y1C-26 aircraft redesignated.
C-26A
Y1C-26A aircraft redesignated.
C-26B
Four aircraft powered by 2× 400 hp (298 kW) Pratt & Whitney R-985-9 engines.
C-29
Two Dolphins, powered by 2× 550 hp (410 kW) Pratt & Whitney R-1340-29 engines, were essentially similar to the Y1C-26As.
OA-3
C-21 aircraft redesignated.

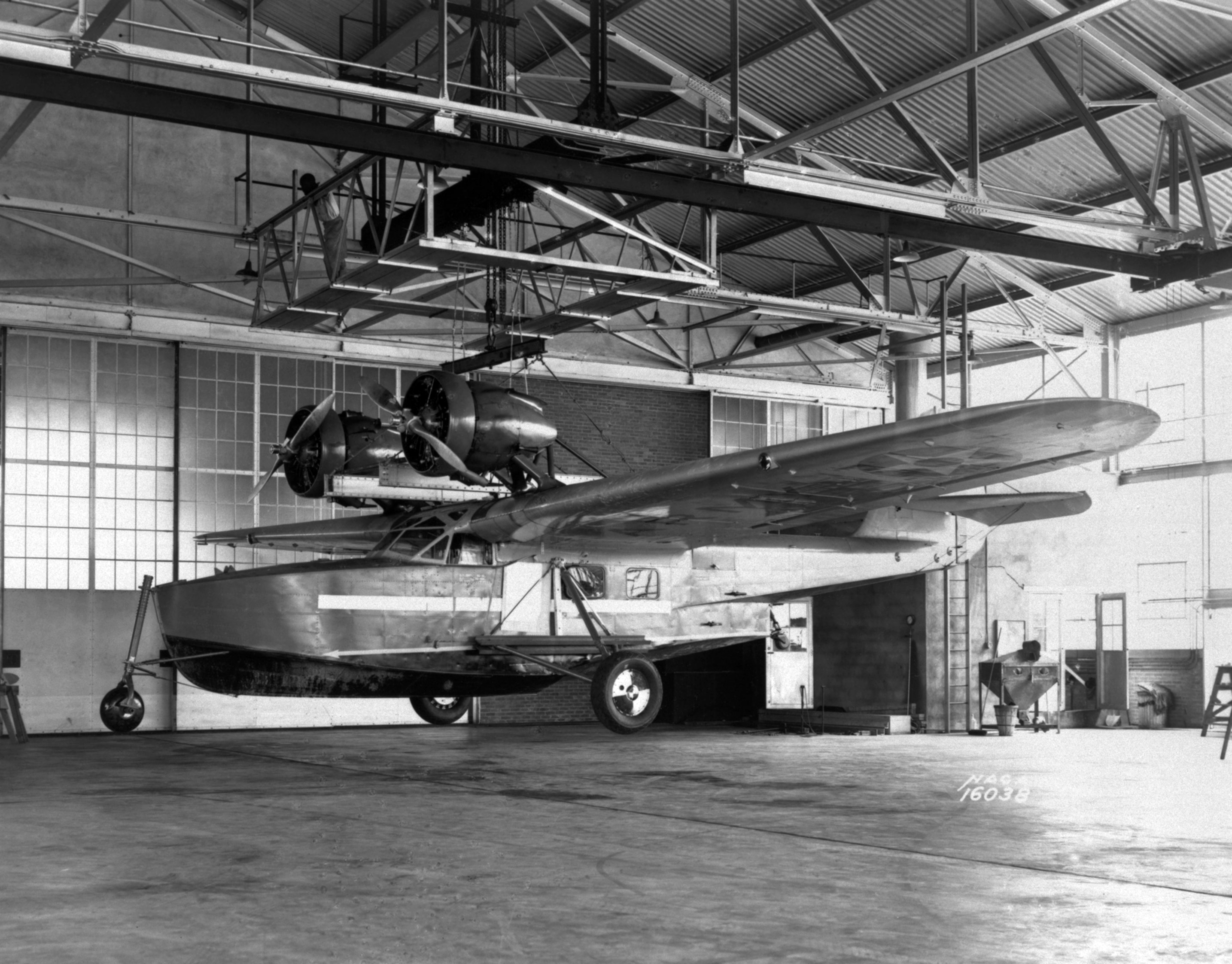
Douglas OA-4A with tricycle landing gear at Langley

OA-4
C-26 aircraft redesignated.
OA-4A
Y1C-26A aircraft redesignated.
OA-4B
C-26B aircraft redesignated, one of which was fitted with an experimental fixed tricycle undercarriage.
OA-4C
Four OA-4A and one OA-4B aircraft modernized in 1936.

== Military operators ==
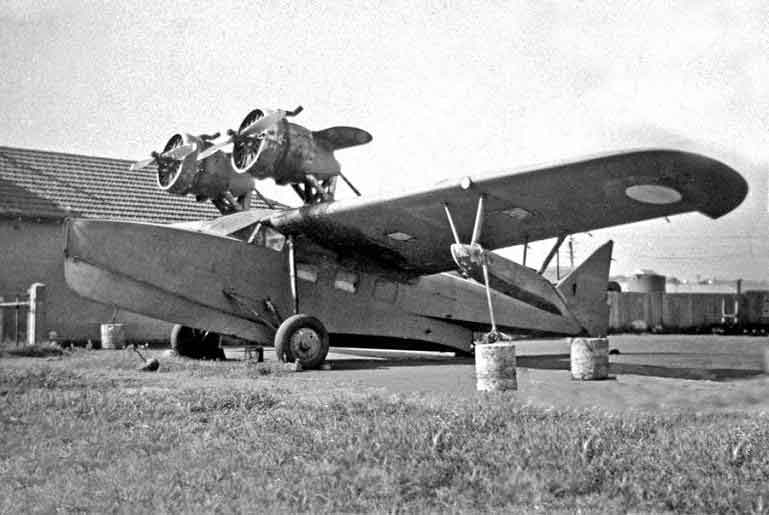
Decommissioned RAAF Dolphin A35-2 (Dolphin 119) at an airfield near Sydney, Australia, 1949.

Argentina

- Argentine Naval Aviation

Australia

- Royal Australian Air Force

United States

- U.S. Army Air Corps
- U.S. Army Air Force
- United States Coast Guard
- U.S. Marine Corps
- United States Navy

== Surviving Aircraft ==
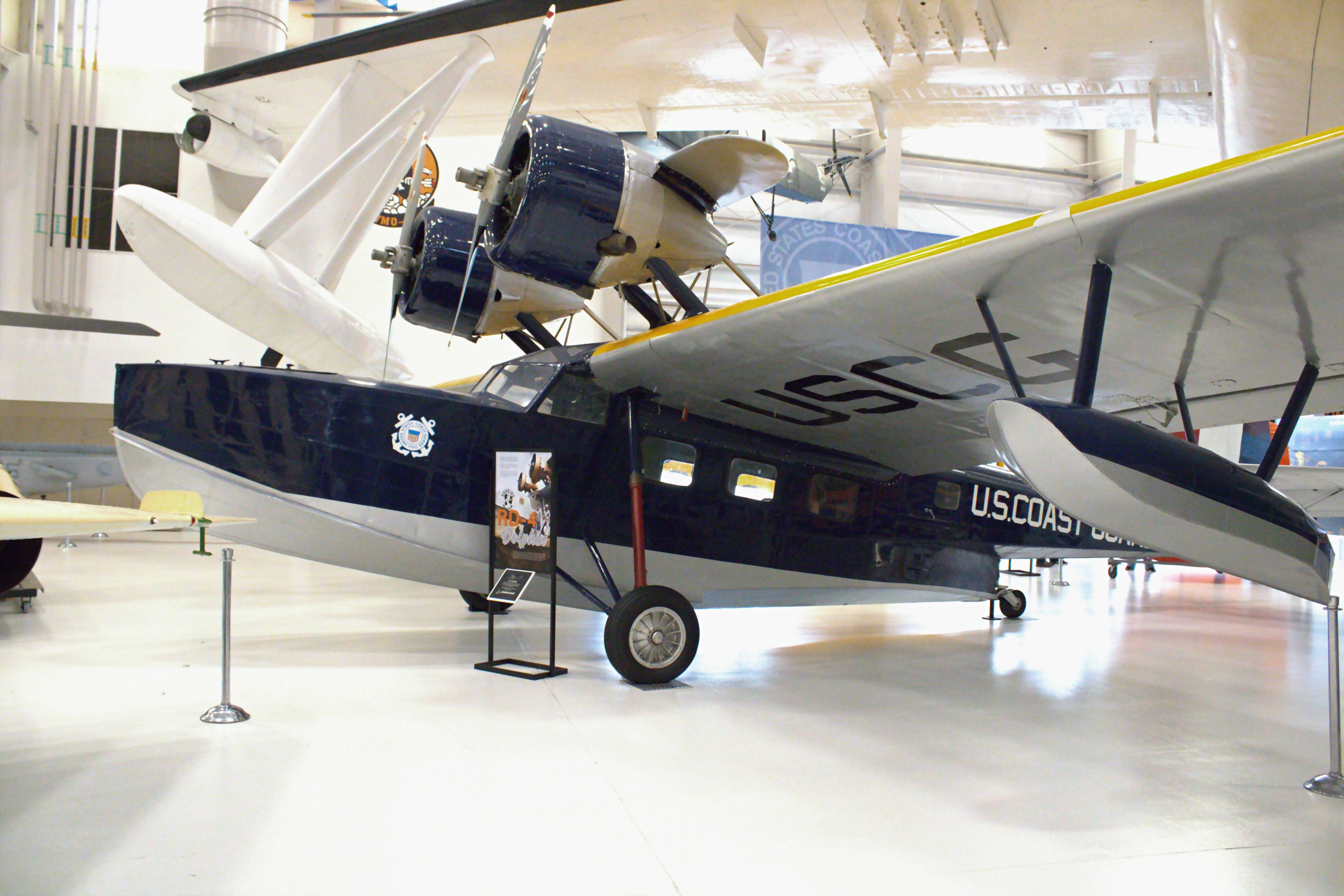
The sole surviving Douglas Dolphin (Dolphin 117 displayed as an RD-4)

- The only surviving Dolphin (Dolphin 117) was originally purchased by William Boeing, which he dubbed Rover, and ended up in CAA service. The aircraft then entered service with Alaska Airlines before being sent to the National Naval Aviation Museum, Naval Air Station Pensacola, Pensacola, Florida, where it currently resides bearing USCG markings and an RD-4 configuration.

== Specifications (RD-3 Dolphin) ==
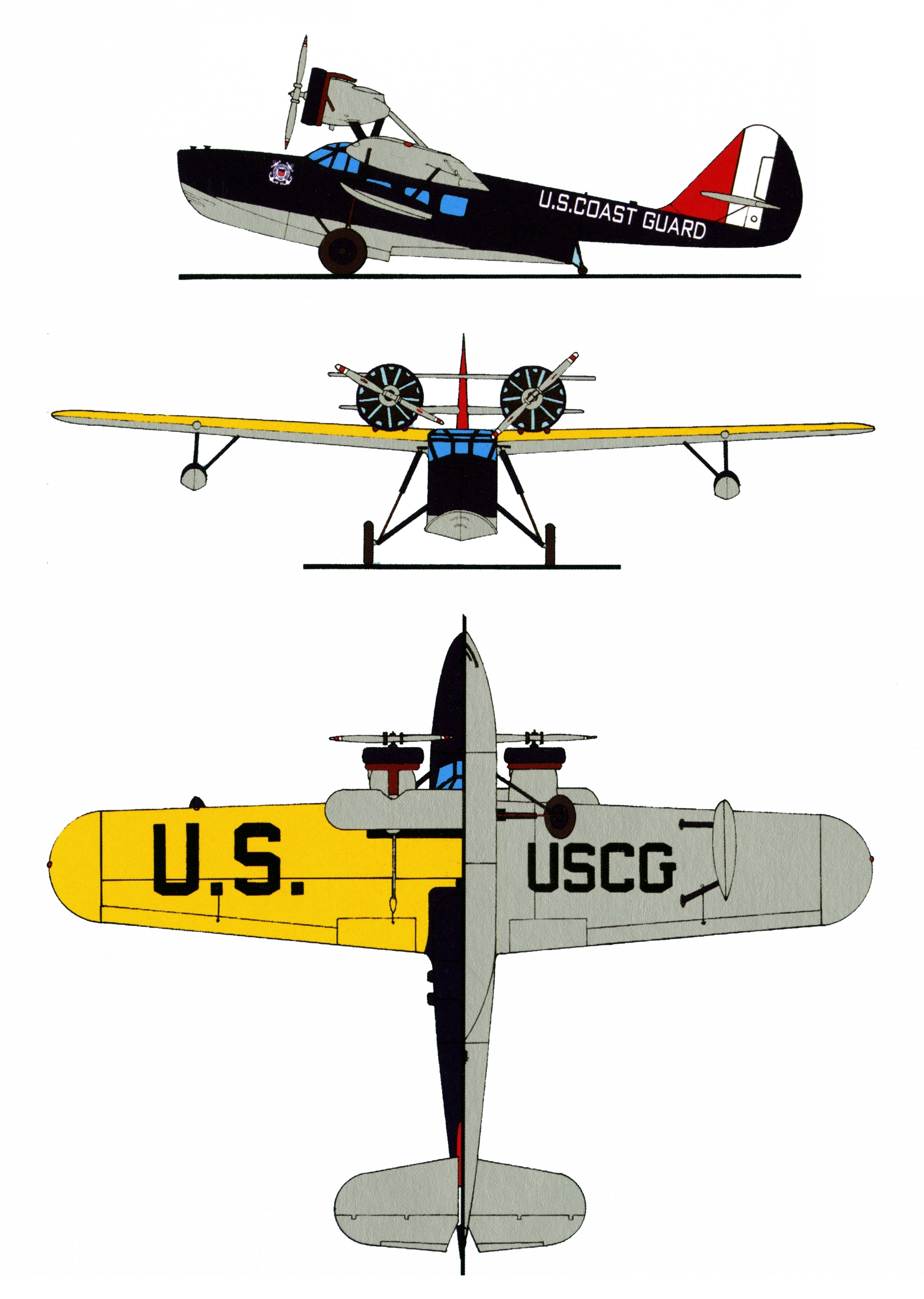

Data from McDonnell Douglas Aircraft since 1920, Vol. 1

General characteristics

- Crew: Two, pilot and co-pilot
- Capacity: Six passengers
- Length: 45 ft 3 in (13.79 m)
- Wingspan: 60 ft (18 m)
- Height: 15 ft 2 in (4.62 m)
- Wing area: 637 sq ft (59.2 m^{2})
- Empty weight: 6,764 lb (3,068 kg)
- Gross weight: 9,734 lb (4,415 kg)
- Fuel capacity: 240 US gal (908 L)
- Powerplant: 2 × Pratt & Whitney R-1340-4 Wasp 9-cyl. air-cooled radial piston engines, 450 hp (340 kW) each

or 2x 450 hp (336 kW) Pratt & Whitney R-1340-96 Wasp engines

Performance

- Maximum speed: 149 mph (240 km/h, 129 kn) at sea level
- Cruise speed: 105 mph (169 km/h, 91 kn)
- Range: 692 mi (1,114 km, 601 nmi)
- Service ceiling: 15,100 ft (4,600 m)
- Rate of climb: 806.5 ft/min (4.097 m/s)
- Time to altitude: 5,000 ft (1,524 m) in 6 minutes, 12 seconds
- Wing loading: 16.4 lb/sq ft (80 kg/m^{2})
- Power/mass: 0.093 hp/lb (0.204 kW/kg)

== See also ==
Aircraft of comparable role, configuration, and era

- General Aviation PJ
- Hopfner HA-11/33
- Saro Cloud
- Saro Cutty Sark
- Grumman Goose

Related lists

- List of aircraft of World War II
- List of military aircraft of the United States
- List of United States Navy aircraft designations (pre-1962)
- List of flying boats and floatplanes
