= Supermarine Air Yacht =

Former luxury flying boat

Air Yacht
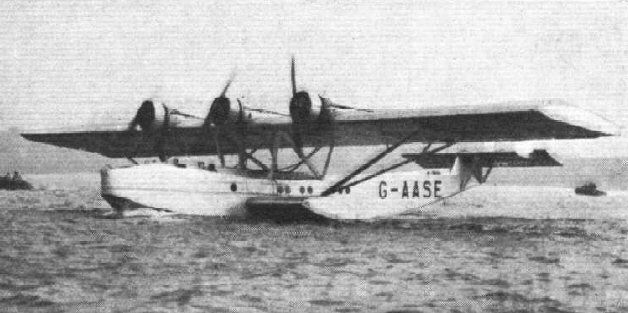
- The only specimen of the Supermarine Air Yacht ever built, moving over the water in 1930. The photograph shows the craft running slowly prior to gathering speed and taking off.

General information
- Type: Luxury transport flying boat
- National origin: United Kingdom
- Manufacturer: Supermarine Aviation Works
- Designer: R. J. Mitchell
- Primary user: Private ownership
- Number built: 1

History
- Manufactured: 1930
- Introduction date: 1930
- First flight: February 1930

The Supermarine Air Yacht was a British luxury passenger-carrying flying boat. It was designed by Supermarine's chief designer R. J. Mitchell and built in Woolston, Southampton in 1929. It was commissioned by the brewing magnate Ernest Guinness, and was the first British flying yacht built to the order of a private owner. Only one machine was built.

The Air Yacht was intended to cover 2,000 miles (3,200 km) without re-fuelling, with a cruising speed of 100 miles per hour (160 km/h). It resembled the Dornier Do J, with the rectangular flat-sided wing spanning 92 feet (28 m) and held high above the fuselage. The three engines were mounted on the leading edge of the wing, and the single braced tailplane had three vertical fins and rudders. The interior was fitted in a luxurious fashion, with an enclosed cabin for the owner, and a separate cabin for five other passengers.

It first flew in February 1930, before undergoing trials the following year at Felixstowe. During the trials it handled well, but was underpowered and climbed poorly; the three engines were subsequently replaced with Armstrong Siddeley Panthers. Guinness refused to complete the purchase, and the plane was put into storage. In October 1932 it was bought by a local wealthy American, Mrs June Jewett James. Soon afterwards it left England for Egypt, but stormy weather forced it to land off Cherbourg, and the crew, along with James and her fellow passengers, were rescued. On 25 January 1933 engine failure caused the plane to ditch into the Gulf of Naples, causing several injuries. The airplane was recovered and impounded by the Italian authorities, but was too damaged to be repaired, and was sold for scrap.

== Development ==
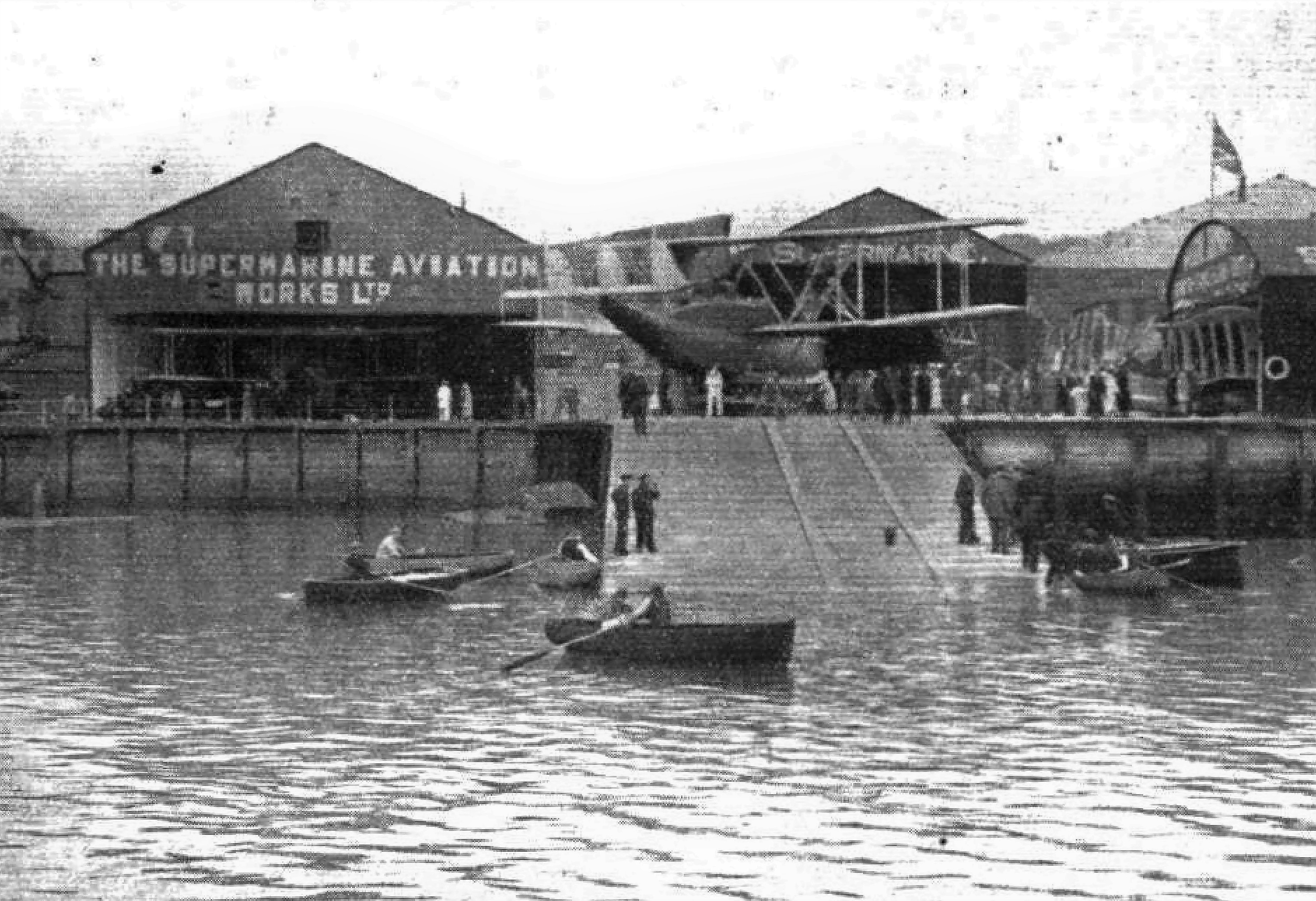
The Supermarine works at Woolston, Hampshire

Supermarine's chief designer R. J. Mitchell was responsible for the design of two air yachts, both of which originated from military commissions. The Supermarine Nanok, an armed version of the Supermarine Southampton built at the company's works at Woolston, was designed for use by the Danish government, but the airplane performed poorly and was rejected by the Danes. The hull was refitted as a luxury cruiser—the Supermarine Solent—and was sold in 1928 to Ernest Guinness, a member of the Guinness family. In 1930 Guinness, who then possessed the air yacht and three other aircraft, owned more private planes than anyone else in Britain. The Solent was registered as a civilian aircraft and given the registration G–AAAB. Guinness made regular trips to and from Southampton Water to Lough Corrib, near his family home. However, the Solent's hull had a restricted height and passengers were unable to stand up fully once inside.

Guinness commissioned Mitchell's second luxury craft, the Supermarine Air Yacht, as a replacement for the Solent. The Air Yacht was to be used by Guinness for pleasure cruising around the Mediterranean. It was the first British flying yacht built to the order of a private owner, and the first of Supermarine's monoplanes to be multi-engined. Based on a 1927 design originally made for the requirements of specification R5/27 for a reconnaissance flying boat for the Royal Air Force, it was built at the Supermarine works in 1929. The price agreed was £34,888 (equivalent to $2,679,000 in 2023), but the production costs reached £52,000 (equivalent to $3,993,000 in 2023).

=== Design ===
The resulting modified design was a flying boat that weighed 10.1 long tons (10.3 t), powered with three Armstrong Siddeley Jaguar engines. It included hull-mounted sponsons instead of the wing-mounted floats common on aircraft of this type, which caused it to resemble the German Dornier Do J; a Supermarine employee afterwards wrote of Mitchell that "he had allowed himself to be lured by some of his bright boys into following other people's ideas." Instead of a wooden biplane, Mitchell designed a monoplane made of metal, with the wing held high above the fuselage on struts and stabilised laterally. The rectangular flat-sided parasol wing had a span of 92 feet (28 m) and sloping V struts for support, and was strengthened with horizontal corrugations. The three radial engines were mounted on the leading edge of the wing. The single braced tailplane had three vertical fins and rudders. The aircraft's surfaces were covered with fabric.

When loaded with a full tanks of petrol, 600 pounds (270 kg) of baggage, and a minimum crew of three, the Air Yacht was designed to cover a distance of 2,000 miles (3,200 km) without re-fuelling. It was designed to have a cruising speed of 100 miles per hour (160 km/h). and a top speed of 120–130 miles per hour (190–210 km/h).

The crew were accommodated in open cockpits in the nose. There was an enclosed cabin for the owner, with its own toilet, bath and bed, and a separate cabin and seating for the other five passengers. The galley was located beneath the wing. The passenger areas were fitted with deep-pile carpets and luxurious furniture; their cabin was 35 feet (11 m) long, 6 feet 6 inches (1.98 m) high and 8 feet (2.4 m) wide.

=== Performance ===
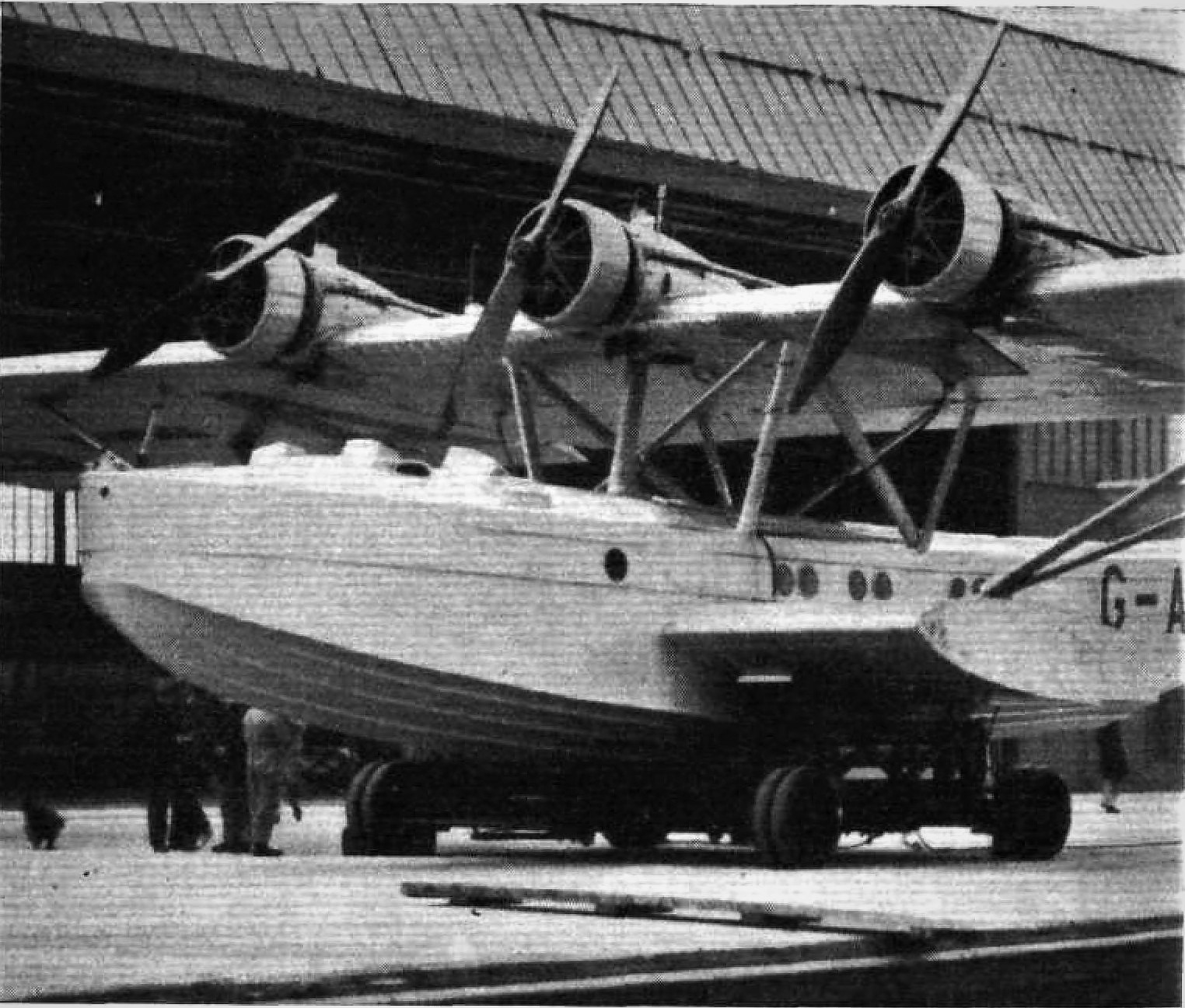
The Air Yacht with its replacement engines

The Air Yacht, which was designated G-AASE, made its first flight in February 1930 at Hythe, Hampshire. During the summer months of 1931 it underwent trials at the Marine Aircraft Experimental Establishment (MAEE) at Felixstowe. When tested carrying loads of 24,000 pounds (11,000 kg), the plane handled well, but couldn't keep height when the fuel flow was reduced. Excess drag was created by the sponsons, one of which suffered from structural failure. The aircraft lost power in one engine and so failed to maintain a high enough altitude needed to be considered safe. Tests also revealed the aircraft was underpowered with a long takeoff run, and poor climb.

The three engines were replaced with three Armstrong Siddeley Panthers, which increased the flying boat's maximum speed, but which still left it incapable of maintaining height when fully loaded with passengers, stores and fuel. It was certified as being airworthy on 22 December 1931, but the aircraft was rejected by Guinness for failing to meet his specifications. He later purchased a Saro Cloud.

== Operational history ==
Having failed to be purchased, the Air Yacht was put into storage by Supermarine. In October 1932, it was seen by chance and then bought by a local wealthy American, Mrs June Jewett James, who knew little of the practicalities of flying an aircraft. James publicised her intention to use the flying boat to establish a regular trans-Atlantic service for passengers and cargo, once trials had been completed.

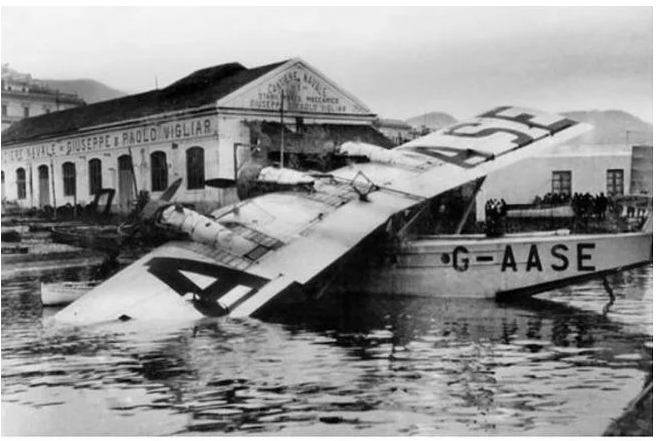
The wreckage of the Air yacht after having been salvaged from the crash site

A month after having been bought by James, the flying boat, now named Windward III, left Woolston on a flight to Egypt. It took off on 11 October 1932, with June James, her daughter, a governess, and two crew members on board. During the flight deteriorating weather conditions forced it to land off the coast near Cherbourg. On October 14, whilst in Cherbourg harbour, the crew and passengers had to call to be rescued and were landed onshore by tugboats, where they remained to await better flying conditions. The plane then flew on to Naples, where James obtained audiences with Pope Pius XI and the Italian dictator, Benito Mussolini.

The flight to Egypt resumed on 25 January 1933, but an engine failed on take-off and later stalled, causing the flying boat to ditch into the Gulf of Naples 7 miles (11 km) off Sorrento. The crew and passengers were rescued by local fishermen, who later recovered the aircraft from the water. The most serious casualty was James, who suffered two broken ribs and a broken leg. The crash caused the aircraft's wing to break. The authorities in Capri impounded the plane against a salvage claim. Too damaged to be repaired, it never flew again, and was sold for scrap the following year; only the engines were returned to England. James was declared bankrupt in July 1933. (Note: In 1940, when living in France, Mrs James offered her home as a refuge for fellow American Eugene Bullard and his daughters when they fled Paris after the Battle of France.)

== Specifications ==
Data from Supermarine Aircraft since 1914

General characteristics

- Crew: 4
- Capacity: 6 passengers
- Length: 66 ft 6 in (20.27 m)
- Wingspan: 92 ft 0 in (28.04 m)
- Wing area: 1,472 sq ft (136.8 m^{2})
- Empty weight: 16,808 lb (7,624 kg)
- Gross weight: 23,348 lb (10,590 kg)
- Powerplant: 3 × Armstrong Siddeley Panther IIA 14-cylinder air-cooled radial piston engines, 525 hp (391 kW) each
- Propellers: 2-bladed fixed-pitch propellers

Performance

- Maximum speed: 102 mph (164 km/h, 89 kn) at 2,000 ft (610 m)
- Service ceiling: 6,500 ft (2,000 m)
- Rate of climb: 380 ft/min (1.9 m/s) at 2,000 ft (610 m)

== See also ==
- List of flying boats and floatplanes

== Sources ==
- Andrews, Charles Ferdinand; Morgan, Eric B. (1987). Supermarine Aircraft since 1914. London: Putnam. ISBN 978-0-85177-800-6.
- Glass, Charles (2011). Americans in Paris: life and death under Nazi occupation. New York: Penguin Books. ISBN 978-01431-1-866-4.
- Jackson, A.J. (1988). British Civil Aircraft 1919–1972. Vol. 3. London: Putnam. ISBN 978-0-85177-818-1.
- Motor Sport Magazine (April 1930). "A 1320 H.P. Air Yacht the Specially-built Supermarine Monoplane". Motor Sport. United Kingdom: Motor Sport Magazine Limited. ISSN 0027-2019.
- Pegram, Ralph (2016). Beyond the Spitfire: The Unseen Designs of R.J. Mitchell. Pegram: The History Press. ISBN 978-0-7509-6515-6.
- Quill, Jeffrey; Cox, Sebastian (1986). Birth of a legend: the Spitfire. Washington, D.C.: Smithsonian Institution Press. ISBN 978-08747-4-776-8.
- Shelton, John K. (2015). From Nighthawk to Spitfire: The Aircraft of R.J. Mitchell. Stroud, Gloucestershire: The History Press. ISBN 978-0-7509-6222-3.
