= A. Roy Knabenshue =

American aeronautical engineer and aviator

Augustus Roy Knabenshue
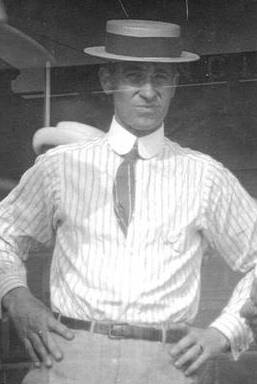
- Atlantic City between July 8 and 13, 1910
- Born: July 15, 1876; Lancaster, Ohio, U.S.
- Died: March 6, 1960 (aged 84); Temple City, California, U.S.
- Resting place: Portal of the Folded Wings
- Occupations: Engineer; aviator

Augustus Roy Knabenshue (July 15, 1876 – March 6, 1960) was an American aeronautical engineer and aviator.

== Biography ==
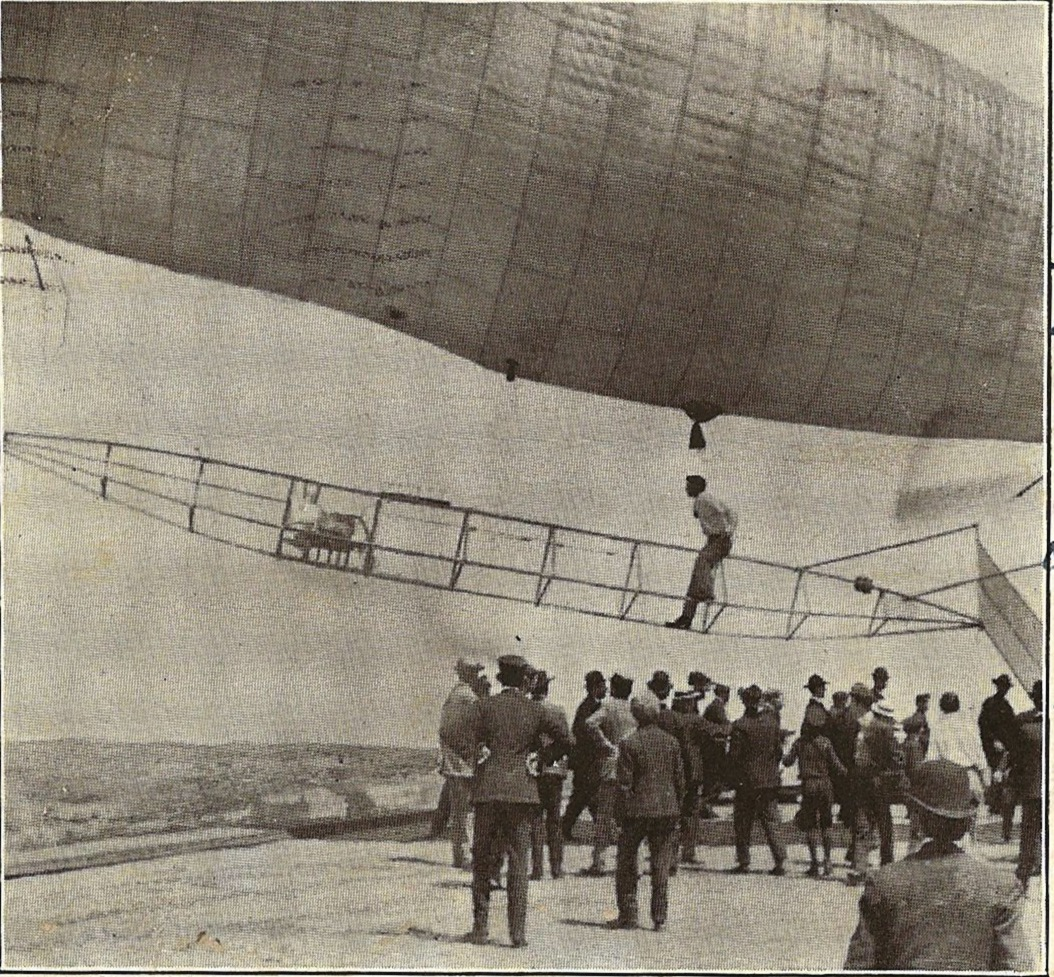
Postcard image from 1905, captioned Knabenshue and his air ship

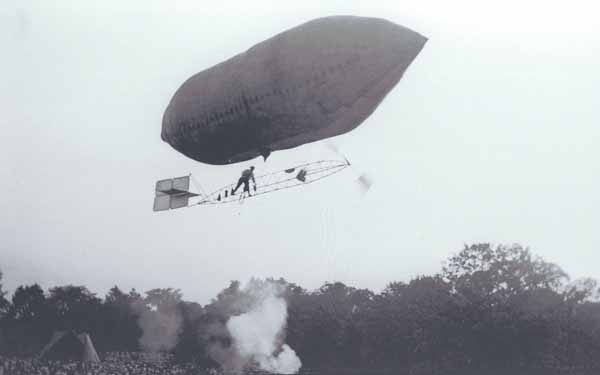
Roy Knabenshue on a dirigible, approximately 1905

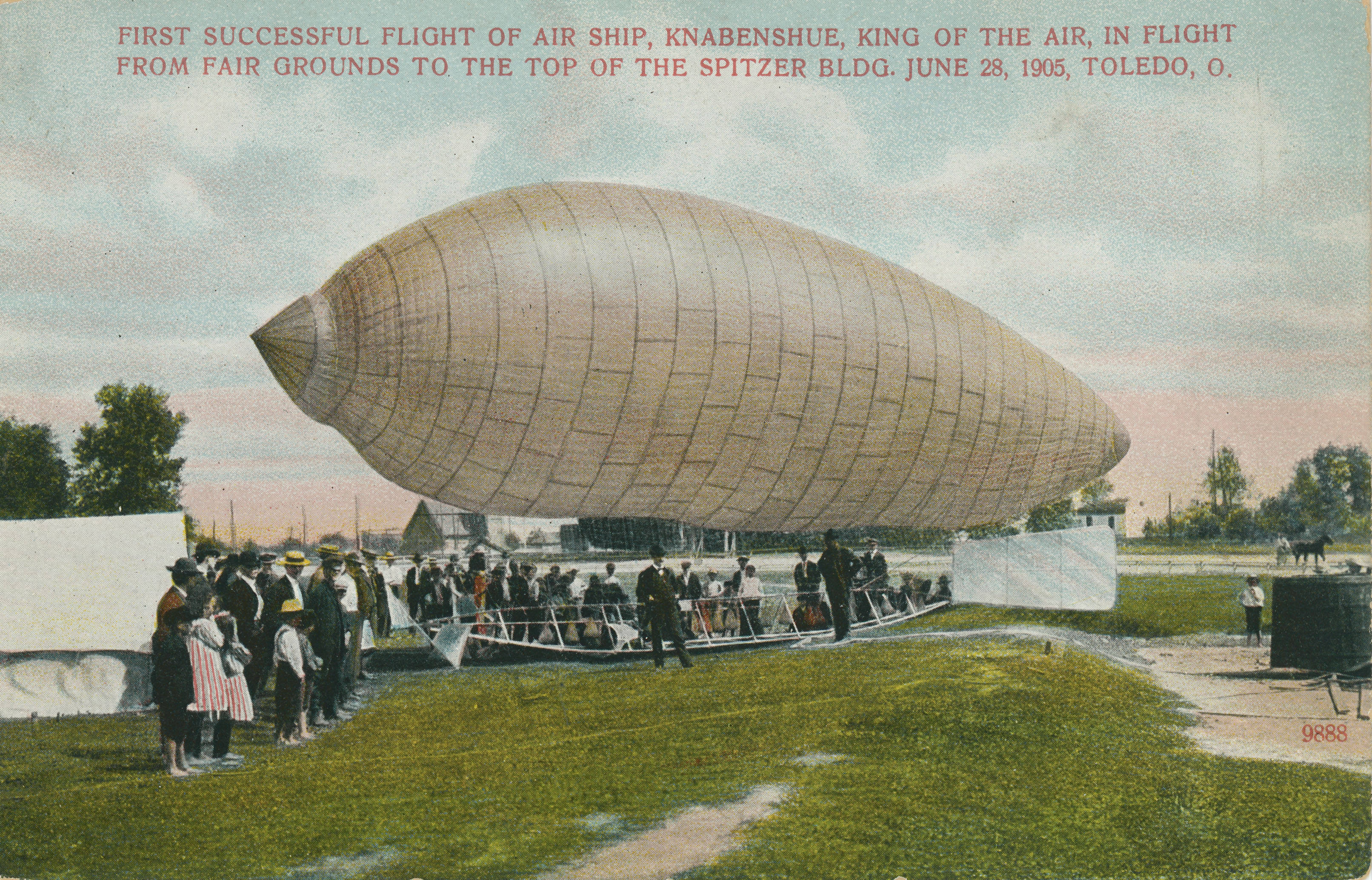
First Successful Flight of the Air Ship, Knabenshue, Toledo, Ohio, 1900s

Film shot by Knabenshue of Chicago in 1914.

Roy Knabenshue was born July 15, 1876, in Lancaster, Ohio, the son of Salome Matlack and Samuel S. Knabenshue. Samuel Knabenshue, an educator and political writer for the Toledo Blade for many years, served as U.S. consul in Belfast, Ireland, from 1905 to 1909 and as consul general in Tianjin, China, from 1909 to 1914. In 1904, at the Louisiana Purchase Exposition, Roy Knabenshue piloted Thomas Scott Baldwin's California Arrow dirigible to a height of 2,000 feet (610 m) and was able to return to the takeoff point.

Knabensue continued working for Baldwin for the next year, operating the Californian Arrow at events around the country. He was the first to make a dirigible flight over New York City in 1905.

In September 1905, Knabenshue stopped in Columbus, Ohio, for a flight at the Ohio State fair. While he was there, he had a falling out with Baldwin over his pay. Knabenshue copied Baldwin's design and built his own airship, which he named Toledo I. He stayed on at the fair and made two ascensions a day. While there, he also met and mentored Cromwell Dixon, who at the age of fifteen was already an aspiring aviator.

The Wright Flyer, the Wright Brothers first flight airplane, was nearly disposed of by the Wrights themselves until, in early 1912, Knabenshue (working as the Wrights Exhibition team manager) had a conversation with Wilbur Wright. He asked Wilbur what they planned to do with the Flyer, and Wright said they would most likely burn it, as they had the 1904 machine. According to writer Charles Taylor, author of the 1948 article reporting the story, Knabenshue talked Wilbur out of disposing of the machine for historical purposes.

In 1913 Knabenshue built the first passenger dirigible in America: White City. He performed barnstorming and worked as the general manager of the Wright Exhibition Team. From 1933 to 1944 he worked for the National Park Service and then worked for a Los Angeles, California, firm reconditioning used aircraft.

In 1958 he had a stroke. He had a second stroke at his home at a trailer park in Arcadia, California, on February 21, 1960. He died on March 6, 1960, at the Evergreen Sanitarium in Temple City, California.

Interment and services were held March 9, 1960, at the Portal of the Folded Wings in Valhalla Memorial Park Cemetery in North Hollywood, California.

In 1965, Knabenshue was inducted into the National Aviation Hall of Fame in Dayton, Ohio.
