= Kirkham Air Yacht =

Air Yacht

General information
- Type: Seaplane
- National origin: United States
- Manufacturer: Kirkham Aeroplane and Motor Co.
- Designer: Charles B. Kirkham
- Number built: 1

History
- Introduction date: 1925

The Kirkham Air Yacht, also called the Kirkham Gull, was an early monoplane executive transport seaplane.

== Design and development ==
The Kirkham Air Yacht was a custom built executive transport built in 1925 for Harold Stirling Vanderbilt. Design and construction was started in 1920 by Charles Kirkham. H T Booth, previously of Curtiss, was also involved in the design. Its mission was to provide transport to and from New York City and Newport, Rhode Island. Its design is very similar to the Collier Trophy-winning Loening S-1 Flying Yacht. The all-metal gull-winged Kirkham Flying Yacht was built concurrently in the same shop in Long Island as the Bonney Gull, another more experimental gull wing design.

The Air Yacht is an all-metal seaplane with a mid-gull wing planform. Power is from a single 450 hp (336 kW) pusher engine. The cockpit is open and the passenger compartment is enclosed.

== Specifications (Kirkham Air Yacht) ==
Data from Skyways, Flight

General characteristics

- Crew: 1
- Capacity: 4 passengers
- Powerplant: 1 × Napier Lion , 450 hp (340 kW)
- Propellers: 3-bladed

Performance

- Maximum speed: 140 kn (160 mph, 260 km/h)

== See also ==
Aircraft of comparable role, configuration, and era

- Loening S-1 Flying Yacht
- Supermarine Air Yacht
