= Loening Model 23 =

1920s American flying boat airliner

Model 23 Air Yacht, S-1
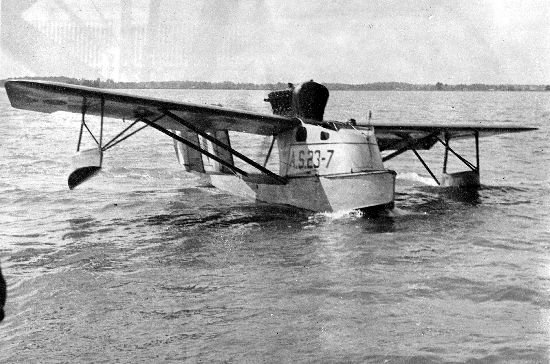
- S-1 of the USAAS

General information
- Type: Flying boat airliner
- National origin: United States
- Manufacturer: Loening
- Number built: 16

History
- First flight: 1921

The Loening S-1 Flying Yacht, also called the Loening Model 23, was an early light monoplane flying boat designed in the United States by Grover Loening in the early 1920s. The aircraft won the 1921 Collier Trophy.

== Design and development ==
The S-1 Flying Yacht was a high-wing, strut-braced monoplane with the engine mounted pusher-fashion in a nacelle atop the wing. The cabin was semi-enclosed, featuring side windows but no roof, and was located immediately ahead of the wing.

Twin tails were fitted, carrying a common stabiliser in a high position. The construction was unusual, in that rather than the flying boat hull being integral with the fuselage, the Model 23's hull was a large, separate pontoon mounted directly underneath a fuselage that was a separate structure. This was intended to combine the safety of a floatplane design with the low parasitic drag of a conventional flying boat Grover Loening was awarded the 1921 Aero Club of America Trophy for the design.

The fuel tank was located under the rear passenger seat. The prototype was tested with a new roll-control mechanism to replace ailerons using a small leading edge that extended and retracted outboard of the wing tips.

== Operational history ==
The S-1 was the second seaplane in monoplane configuration ever to go into production. It was one of the fastest seaplanes in production in 1921. The S-1 set a world seaplane record of 141 mph (227 km/h) in 1921 winning the Collier trophy for the year. An S-1 set a world record for altitude with four passengers flying to a height of 19,500 ft (5,944 m) over Long Island, New York in August 1921.

Three of the Air Yachts were purchased by the New York-Newport Air Service, and nine by the United States Army Air Service which operated them under the designation S-1.

On a test-flight on 16 August 1921, an Air Yacht piloted by David McCulloch reached an altitude of 19,500 ft (5,900 m) carrying three passengers (Grover Loening, Leroy Grumman, and Ladislas d'Orcy) in what was believed to be a record at the time. On 7 November 1924, Victor E. Bertrandias set a world airspeed record for a seaplane over a 1000-km course, with a speed of 103 mph (164 km/h) in an Army S-1.

== Variants ==
S-1
Nine delivered to the United States Army
Model 23
Three delivered to New York-Newport Air Service and flown until 1923.
Type 23
One custom Type 23 was ordered by Vincent Astor, and a second 400 hp (298 kW) Curtiss powered variant was also ordered.
Custom 300 hp
Wright Aeronautical ordered a 300 hp (224 kW) Wright powered variant for a corporate aircraft named "Wilbur Wright".

== Operators ==
United States

- New York-Newport Air Service
- United States Army Air Service (Nine with the military designation S-1)

== Specifications (S-1) ==
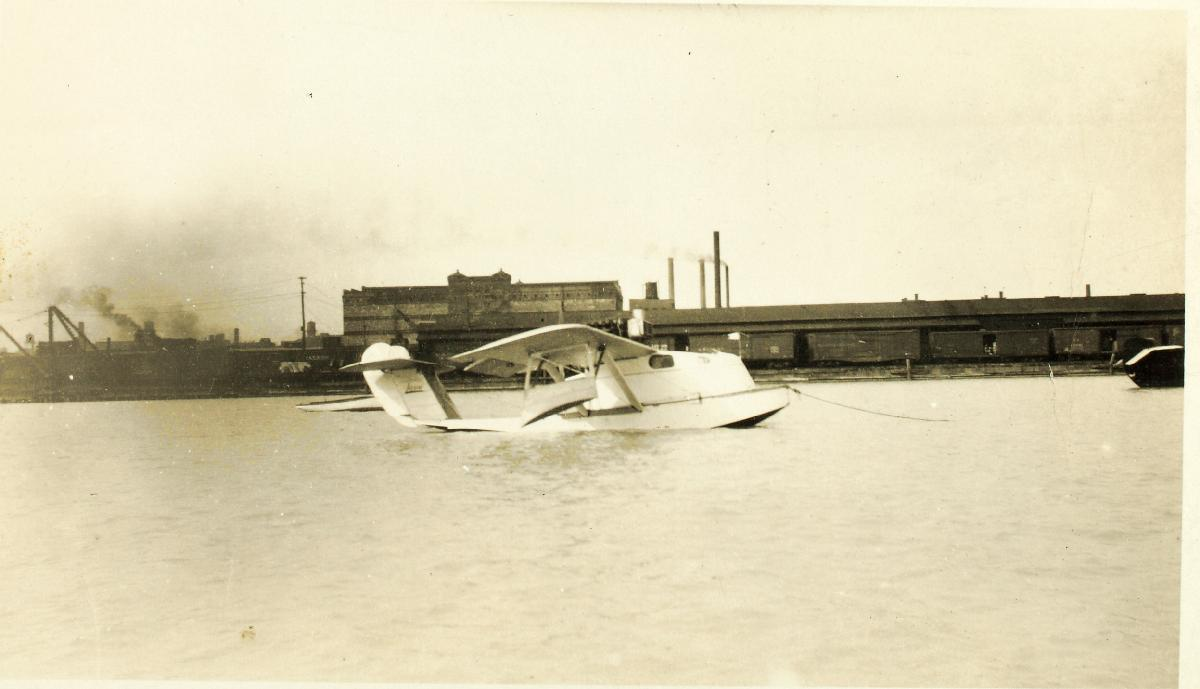
A civilian Air Yacht

Data from American Flying Boats and Amphibious Aircraft: An Illustrated History;

General characteristics

- Crew: 1
- Capacity: 4
- Length: 30 ft (9.1 m)
- Wingspan: 45 ft (14 m)
- Height: 8 ft (2.4 m)
- Wing area: 330 sq ft (31 m^{2})
- Empty weight: 2,200 lb (998 kg)
- Gross weight: 3,550 lb (1,610 kg)
- Powerplant: 1 × Liberty L-12 , 400 hp (300 kW)
- Propellers: 4-bladed Hartzell

Performance

- Maximum speed: 123 kn (141 mph, 227 km/h)
- Cruise speed: 96 kn (110 mph, 180 km/h)
- Service ceiling: 19,500 ft (5,900 m)
- Rate of climb: 950 ft/min (4.8 m/s)
- Time to altitude: 10 mins. to 9,500ft.
- Wing loading: 10.7 lb/sq ft (52 kg/m^{2})
- Power/mass: 8.9lbs/hp

== See also ==
Aircraft of comparable role, configuration, and era

- Spencer Air Car
- Republic Seabee
- Kirkham Air Yacht
