= Hazlehurst =

Hazlehurst may refer to the following places in the United States:

- Hazlehurst, Georgia
- Hazlehurst, Mississippi

== People with the surname ==
- Edward Hazlehurst, American architect
- Noni Hazlehurst, Australian actress
- Ronnie Hazlehurst (1928–2007), musician known for his work for the BBC
- Thomas Hazlehurst (artist) (c.1740–c.1821), English miniature painter
- Thomas Hazlehurst (businessman) (1779–1842), businessman
- Thomas Hazlehurst (chapel builder) (1816–1876), son of the above, noted as a chapel builder

== See also ==
- Hazlehurst & Sons of Runcorn, Cheshire, England, soap and alkali manufacturers
- Hazelhurst (disambiguation)
