= Thomas Hazlehurst =

Thomas Hazlehurst may refer to:

- Thomas Hazlehurst (artist) (c. 1740–c. 1821), English miniature painter
- Thomas Hazlehurst (businessman) (1779–1842), English businessman who founded a soap and alkali manufacturing company in Runcorn, Cheshire
- Thomas Hazlehurst (chapel builder) (1816–1876), his son, known for the building of 12 Wesleyan Methodist chapels
