= Haselhurst =

Haselhurst is a surname. Notable people with the surname include:

- Alan Haselhurst, Baron Haselhurst (born 1937), British politician
- Peter Haselhurst (born 1957), Australian field hockey player
- Ralph Haselhurst, English MP

== See also ==
- Hazelhurst (disambiguation)
