= Cicely Ethel Wilkinson =

British pioneer pilot

- Born: 5 June 1882/83; Eastbourne, Sussex, England
- Died: 27 May 1967; Haywards Heath, Sussex, England

Cicely Ethel Wilkinson (5 June 1882 – 27 May 1967) was a British pioneer pilot and was possibly the only woman to qualify as a pilot in Britain during the First World War. She also served as chauffeur for the French Red Cross and was possibly employed as an ambulance driver on the Western Front during the war.

== Personal life ==
Cicely Ethel Wilkinson (née Cardwell) was born in Eastbourne, Sussex on 5 June 1882/1883 to Colonel William Alexander Cardwell and Lilian Cardwell (née Brodie). Wilkinson's 1939 register booklet lists her date of birth as 5 June 1882 but her marriage certificate suggests she was born in 1883/1884 (probably 1883); furthermore, her aviation certificate gives her date of birth as 5 June 1888. On 12 October 1903 and aged 20, Wilkinson married Henry Edward Thornton Wilkinson. In 1911, Wilkinson and her husband were living in Malton, Yorkshire, where their occupation in the 1911 census was described as "private means". In 1919, Wilkinson petitioned the British Divorce Court for the restitution of her conjugal rights with her husband; they were still living together in 1939.

== First World War ==
Between April and October 1915, Wilkinson served as a chauffeur for the British Committee of the French Red Cross and may also have served as an ambulance driver on the Western Front. On 11 September 1916, Wilkinson qualified as a pilot in a Caudron biplane at the Beatty School at Hendon Aerodrome for which she received Royal Aero Club Aviator Certificate number 3522. She was possibly the only woman to qualify as a pilot in Britain during the First World War. In 1918, she wrote Pers libres poems, published by New Line Press. After the war, Wilkinson was awarded the British War Medal and British Victory Medal in recognition of her wartime service.

Cicely's brother Hugh Brodie Cardwell, a Captain in the Royal Field Artillery, was killed in action on 9 August 1918 and is buried at St. Sever Cemetery, Rouen.

== Later life ==
Wilkinson's wartime interest in automobiles continued into peacetime. Between 1937 and 1938, "the intrepid Mrs Wilkinson", then of St Minver, Cornwall, was the owner of an Aston Martin 2.0-Litre 15/98 Tourer, sold to her by Lancelot Prideaux-Brune. Wilkinson would have been a relatively rare female driver of a powerful luxury car.

Wilkinson died in Haywards Heath, Sussex on 27 May 1967 at the Brooklands Nursing Home.
