= Gwendolyn Pates =

American actress (1891–1970)

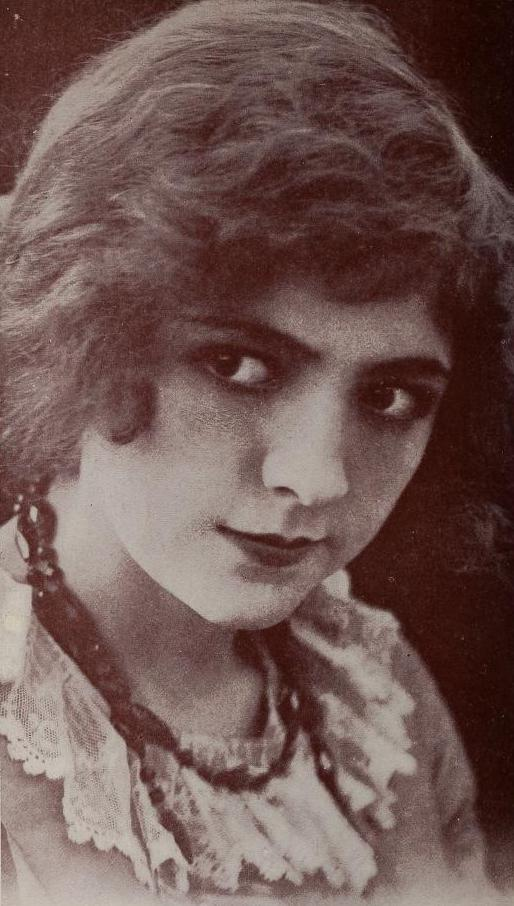
- Gwendolyn Pates, from a 1913 publication
- Born: April 4, 1891; Dallas, Texas
- Died: November 1970 (aged 79); New York
- Other names: Gwendoline Pates, Gwendolen Pates, Gwendolyn Grew
- Occupation: actress

Gwendolyn Pates (April 4, 1891 – November 1970), also billed as Gwendoline Pates, was an American actress in silent films and on stage.

== Early life ==
Gwendoline Ivore Pates was born in Dallas, Texas, the daughter of Frederick B. Pates and Allie Beckwith Pates. Her father was a voice teacher. She and her sister attended the Boyd Theater School of Acting in Omaha. Her sister Vivian Pates was also an actress. She lived some of her youth in Alton, Illinois.

== Career ==
As an actress, Pates was best known for "dainty, girlish" roles that focused on her "bewitching prettiness" and adventurous nature. She appeared in more than forty short silent films between 1911 and 1915. She was often in the title role, for example in His Date with Gwendoline (1913), The Blind Girl of Castle Guille (1913), and When Romance Came to Anne (1914). In 1912 she appeared with George W. Beatty in An Aeroplane Love Affair. Beatty was not an actor, but he was the chief test pilot and instructor at the United States Army Aviation School.

She explained about her work: "The necessary qualifications for a successful photoplayer are that you must photograph well, and be able to express facially the idea you want to convey to the audience."

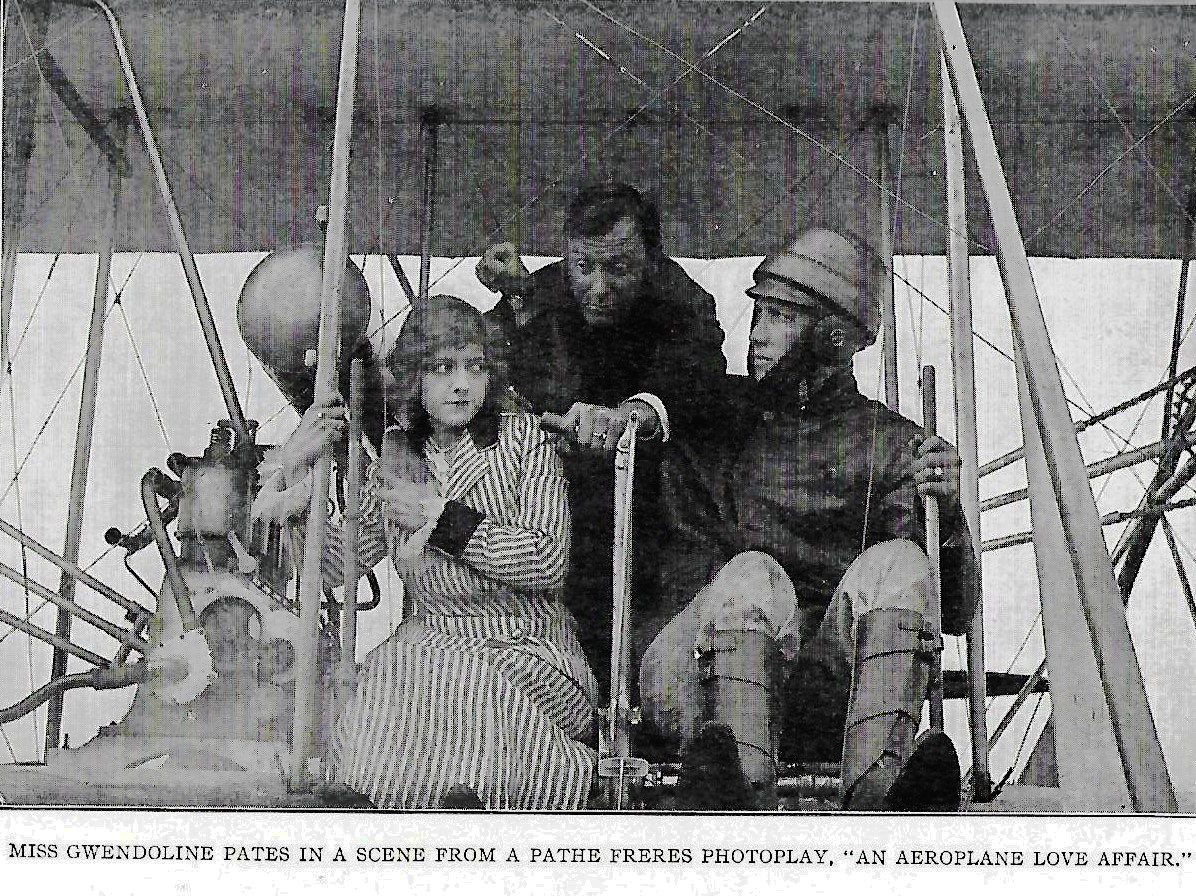
Pates with George W. Beatty in An Aeroplane Love Affair (1912)

In For Mayor – Bess Smith (1913), Pates played a woman running for political office, who instead accepts her opponent's marriage proposal. For herself, she said she did not want the vote; "I'm truly so busy that I couldn't stop to vote," she told an interviewer in 1913.

After her time in films, Pates performed in vaudeville. She and her husband had a stock company, the Grew-Pates Players, performing The Gates of America, Electrocuted at 5 A. M., Tess of the Storm Country, The Lure of the City, The End of the Trail, After Five, The Prince Chap, and a stage version of The Perils of Pauline, in Boston and elsewhere, in 1914 and 1915. In 1917, she headlined The Heart of Wetona in New York and on tour. The Grew-Pates Players were based in Canada in 1918 and 1920. In 1927, she appeared on Broadway in the original cast of The Mating Season, a farce; her husband wrote the show, and was also in the cast.

== Personal life ==
Gwendolyn Pates married actor and playwright William A. Grew by 1914. They divorced after 1927. She died in 1970, aged 79 years, in New York.
