= Leighton Wilson Hazlehurst Jr. =

American aviation pioneer (1887–1912)

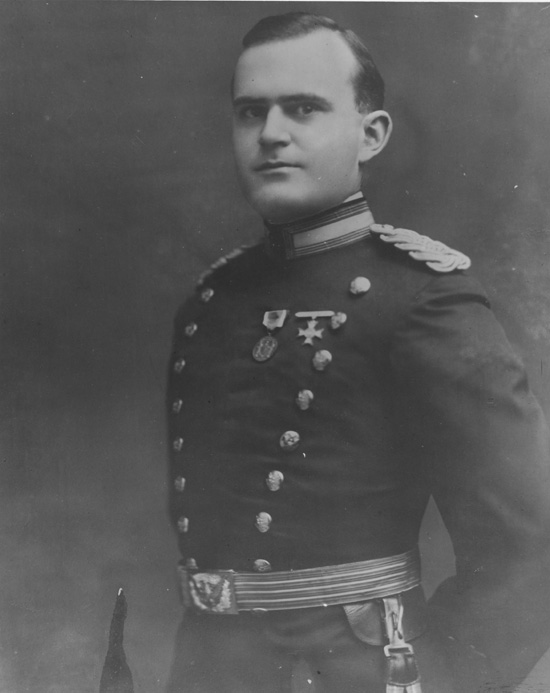
- Born: July 1, 1887; Macon, Georgia, US
- Died: June 11, 1912 (aged 24); United States Army Aviation School; College Park, Maryland, US
- Cause of death: Aircrash
- Resting place: Arlington National Cemetery
- Education: United States Military Academy
- Occupation: Pilot
- Employer: Aeronautical Division, U.S. Signal Corps

Leighton Wilson Hazlehurst Jr. (July 1887 – June 11, 1912) was a pioneer aviator who was killed in an aircrash with Al Welsh piloting. Hazlehurst was the third United States Army officer to die in an aviation accident. The two to die before him were Thomas Etholen Selfridge and George Edward Maurice Kelly.

== Biography ==
He was born in July 1887 in Macon, Georgia to Jessie M. (1865–?) and Leighton Wilson Hazlehurst Sr. (1862–?). His father worked for the railroad. Leighton Jr. was appointed to the United States Military Academy at West Point, New York. He was a classmate of Hap Arnold's. He was an appointee from Mississippi. He graduated and was commissioned as a second lieutenant in the 17th Infantry in 1908.

He was detailed as a student aviator to the Aeronautical Division, U.S. Signal Corps on March 1, 1912, and reported to the Aviation School in its temporary winter quarters at Augusta, Georgia, where he began instruction with Lt. Thomas DeWitt Milling. The school returned to its previous field at College Park, Maryland, on April 1, 1912.

On June 11, 1912, Hazlehurst was a passenger accompanying Al Welsh of the Wright Flying School as an official observer during an acceptance trial for the Army's first Wright Model C airplane. The plane crashed and both men were killed. He was survived by his wife and an 8-year-old daughter. Although protocol for funerals for officers of his rank called only for the participation of a platoon of infantry, the entire garrison at Fort Myer including all the Army's aviators turned out for the ceremony, while a squadron of the 15th Cavalry and battalion of the 3rd Field Artillery provided the honor escort.

== Legacy ==
Hazlehurst was buried at Arlington National Cemetery in Virginia. Hazlehurst Field, New York, a major flying training center during World War I, was named for him. The two US Army aviators to die before him were Thomas Etholen Selfridge and George Edward Maurice Kelly.

== See also ==
- List of aviators killed in aviation accidents or incidents before 1916
- List of accidents and incidents involving military aircraft (pre-1925)
