= George E. M. Kelly =

American aviator

George Edward Maurice Kelly
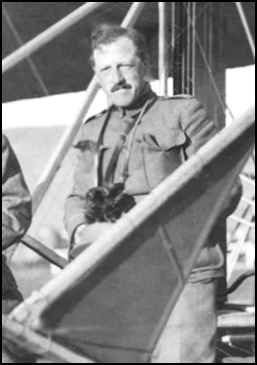
- Kelly c. 1910–1911
- Born: December 11, 1878; London, England
- Died: May 10, 1911 (aged 32); Fort Sam Houston Hospital
- Cause of death: Aircrash
- Title: Second US Army flyer killed in crash
- Predecessor: Thomas Selfridge
- Successor: Leighton Wilson Hazelhurst, Jr.

George Edward Maurice Kelly (11 December 1878 – 10 May 1911) was the 12th pilot of the U.S. Army's Aeronautical Division, U.S. Signal Corps and the first member of the U.S. military killed in the crash of an airplane he was piloting. He was the second U.S. Army aviation fatality, preceded by Lieutenant Thomas Selfridge, who was killed while flying as an observer in a Wright Flyer piloted by Orville Wright on 17 September 1908.

== Biography ==
Kelly was born on 11 December 1878 in London, England, and educated at Bedford Modern School. He emigrated, gained U.S. citizenship, and joined the U.S. Army in 1904. He was a 2nd Lieutenant.

On January 16, 1911, Kelly was a troop officer in the 30th Infantry when he participated in an exhibition reconnaissance flight with Wright Company pilot Walter Brookins. Kelly volunteered for flying training and was detailed to the Aeronautical Division, U.S. Signal Corps and sent to the Curtiss aviation school in San Diego, California. Before his training was completed, two other pilots (1st Lieutenant Paul W. Beck and 2nd Lieutenant John C. Walker, Jr.) and he were sent to Fort Sam Houston, in San Antonio, Texas, where the Maneuver Division had been activated in March. First Lieutenant Benjamin Foulois, then the Army's sole aviator, was also stationed at "Fort Sam" with its sole operational aircraft, a leased Wright Model B. There, the Army accepted delivery of two new aircraft, a Curtiss Model D, serial number S.C. No. 2, and a Wright Model B, S.C. No. 3, on April 27, 1911, and resumed training for the three prospective pilots.

On 10 May 1911, Kelly took S.C. No. 2 up alone for his pilot qualification flight. The airplane had nearly crashed a week before with Walker at the controls, and Beck had then damaged it in a test flight following. After five minutes in the air, Kelly came down for a landing at what appeared be full speed, and failed to level off in time. The front wheel of the airplane struck the ground, breaking the fork of the steering wheel. Heading for the tent encampment of the infantry, Kelly managed to pull up and turn to make another landing attempt. This time the airplane went out of control and crashed, pitching Kelly 100 feet out of the aircraft.

The investigating board ruled that the crash occurred because the first landing had damaged the control system, and that Kelly sacrificed himself to avoid plowing into the encampment. He died from a skull fracture at Fort Sam Houston Hospital an hour after the accident. He was buried in San Antonio National Cemetery.

Foulois felt that the accident was the fault of Beck (who had in the meantime been promoted to captain and now commanded the small unit, to the annoyance of the more experienced Foulois) for the use of faulty materials to rebuild the plane after Beck's accident the preceding week. The plane's Curtiss mechanic, however, blamed Kelly's poor flying technique, stating that when he banked the plane to turn away from the infantry camp, the wing struck the ground. Due to this crash, the commanding officer of the Maneuver Division, Maj. Gen. William Harding Carter, banned further training flights at the fort. The flying section, now led by Capt. Beck and including the repaired S.C. No. 2, was shipped to College Park, Maryland, in June–July 1911 where the Army opened its own flying school in June.

== Legacy ==
A new airfield built in 1917, just southwest of San Antonio, was named Camp Kelly on 11 June 1917, then Kelly Field on 30 July 1917, and finally Kelly Air Force Base on 29 January 1948.

== See also ==
- List of fatalities from aviation accidents
