= Oscar Brindley =

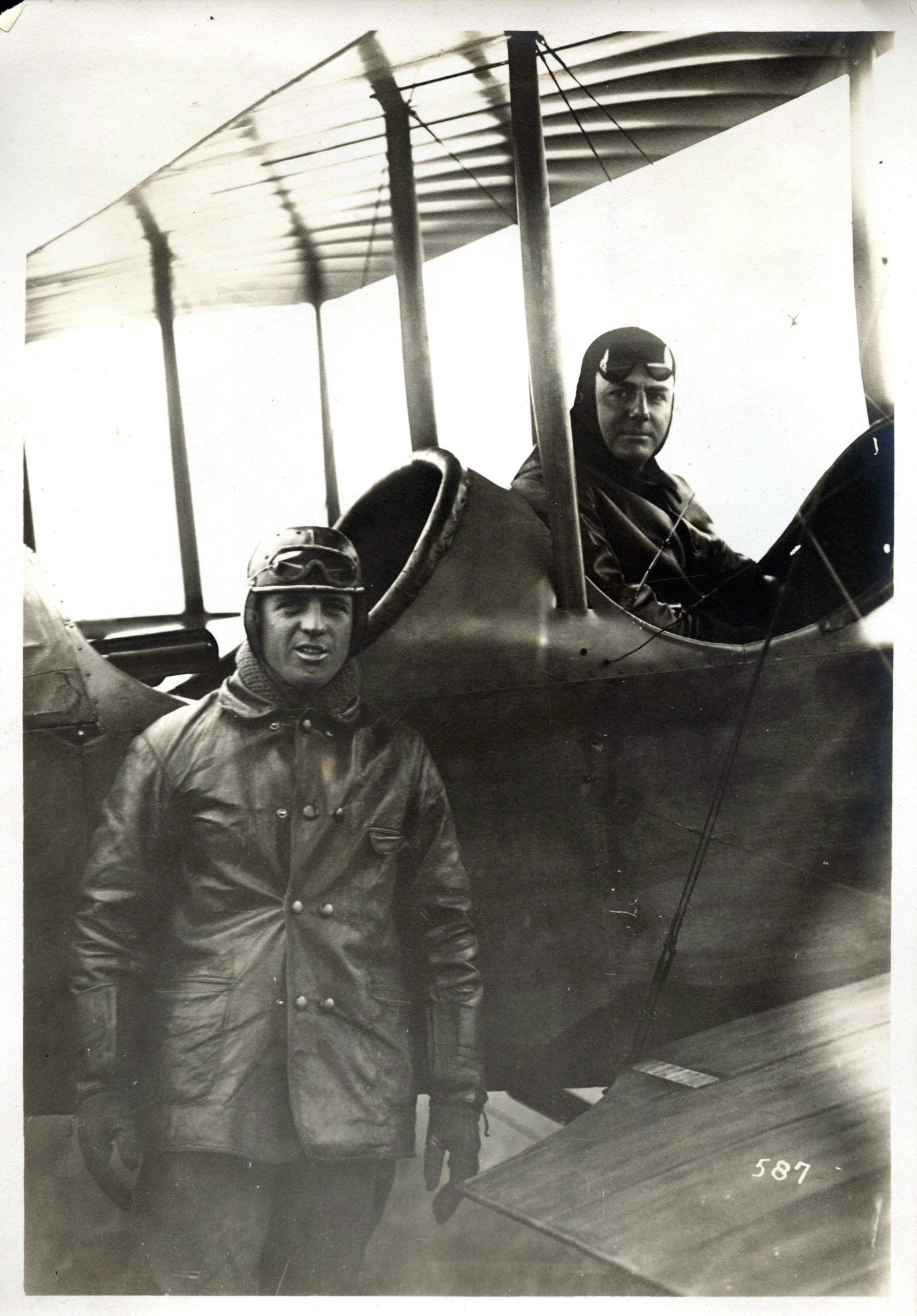
- Lt. Harry Gantz, Oscar Brindley in cockpit
- Born: Oscar Allen Brindley; November 21, 1885; Athens, Ohio, US
- Died: May 2, 1918 (aged 32); Dayton, Ohio, US McCook Field
- Resting place: Washington Cemetery, Washington Pennsylvania (Washington County, Pennsylvania)
- Occupations: aviator, instructor
- Years active: 1910-18

Oscar Brindley (November 21, 1885 – May 2, 1918) was a pioneering United States aviator, barnstormer, instructor and military pilot. He was trained at the Wright Brothers Flying School in Dayton Ohio.

== Death ==
Having reached the rank of major in the Army (Signal Corps), Brindley was killed May 2, 1918, at Dayton Ohio with Col. Henry Damm while testing a new American-built Airco DH.4, the American version of the De Havilland DH-4. Reportedly the DH-4 dropped to the ground while making a turn at 400 feet (120 m).

== See also ==
- Wright Flying School
