= Hazelhurst =

Hazelhurst means earsh (arable land) overgrown with hazel. It may refer to:

== People ==
- Leighton Wilson Hazelhurst Jr., American aviator
- Ronnie Hazelhurst, British Composer

== Places ==
in Australia

- Hazelhurst Regional Gallery and Arts Centre in Gymea, New South Wales, Australia

in the United States

- Hazelhurst, Illinois
- Hazelhurst (Skaneateles, New York), listed on the National Register of Historic Places in Onondaga County
- Hazelhurst, Wisconsin, a town
- Hazelhurst (community), Wisconsin, an unincorporated community
- Hazel Hurst, Pennsylvania, a village in McKean County
- Hazlehurst, Mississippi, a city in and the county seat of Copiah County, Mississippi

== See also ==
- Hazlehurst (disambiguation)
