= Hendon Aerodrome =

Aerodrome in London, England, 1908–1968

- Hendon, north London, England
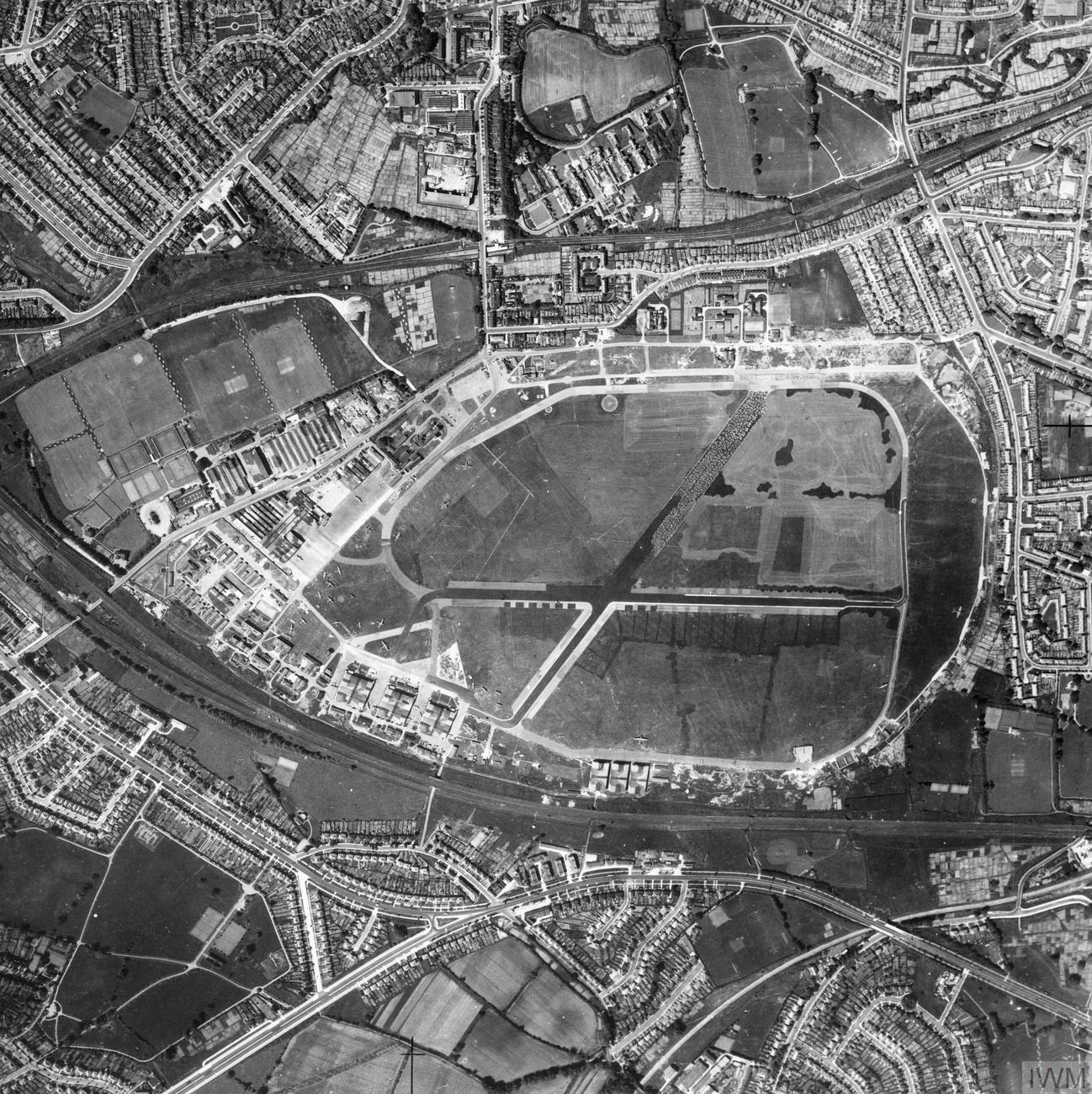
- Aerial view, c. 1941–1942

Site information
- Type: Naval air station Royal Air Force station
- Owner: Air Ministry (1922–1964); Ministry of Defence
- Controlled by: Grahame-White Aviation Co. Royal Navy; Royal Air Force

Location
- Coordinates: 51.601°N 0.245°W

Site history
- In use: c. 1908 – 1 April 1987
- Battles/wars: First World War; Second World War

Hendon Aerodrome was an aerodrome in London, England, that was an important centre for aviation from 1908 to 1968.

It was situated in Colindale, seven miles (11 km) north west of Charing Cross. It nearly became a central hub of civil aviation ("the Charing Cross of [the UK's] international air routes"), but for the actions of the RAF after the First World War in reserving it for military aviation. It was known as a place of pioneering experiments including the first airmail, the first parachute descent from a powered aircraft, the first night flights and the first aerial defence of a city.

== Beginnings ==
Henry Coxwell and James Glaisher were the first to fly from Hendon in a balloon called the Mammoth in 1862. Ballooning at the Brent Reservoir was a popular spectacle for crowds on bank holidays late in the 19th century. The first powered flight from Hendon was in an 88-foot (27 m) long non-rigid airship built by Spencer Brothers of Highbury. It took off from the Welsh Harp Reservoir in 1909, piloted by Henry Spencer with one passenger, the Australian suffragette Muriel Matters. The first attempt at heavier-than-air flight was by H.P. Martin and G.H. Handasyde, also at Welsh Harp. They constructed a monoplane with four engines in the ballroom of the hotel, but were never able to get airborne.

Inspired by Louis Blériot's flight across the Channel, Everett, Edgecumbe and Co began to experiment with an aircraft to be built at their works at Colindale near Hendon, erecting a small hangar to house it. From 1908 to 1910, their "Grasshopper", as the plane was called, taxied about and left the ground briefly, but failed to get truly airborne, although these attempts attracted quite a crowd.

In 1906, before any powered flight had taken place in Britain, the Daily Mail newspaper had challenged aviators to fly from London to Manchester or vice versa, offering a prize of £10,000. The journey had to be completed within twenty-four hours, with no more than two landings. Aircraft and engine design had improved sufficiently by 1910 to make an attempt to win the prize realistic, and both Claude Grahame-White and the French aviator Louis Paulhan prepared for the challenge during April 1910. Grahame-White made two attempts, but it was Paulhan who succeeded. He chose a field on the future aerodrome site as his point of departure. On 27 April he flew 117 miles (188 km) from Hendon to Lichfield, easily the longest flight accomplished in the UK at that time. Before dawn on 28 April he took off and reached Burnage on the outskirts of Manchester after three hours 55 minutes in the air, during a period of just over twelve hours. This was the first true flight from the Hendon site.

== London Aerodrome ==
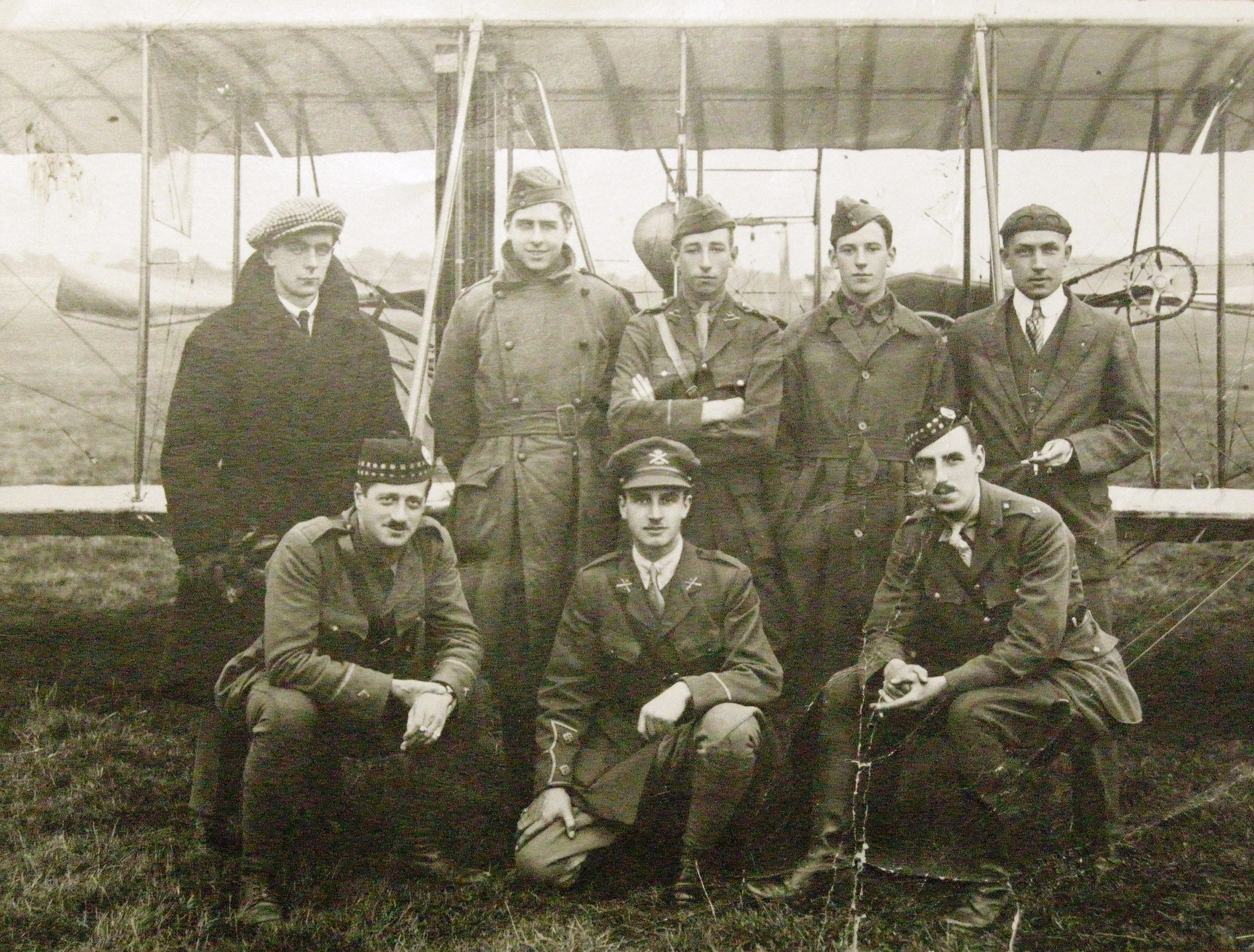
George Beatty (far right) and colleague with six student pilots destined for the Royal Flying Corps, photographed at Hendon in August 1916.

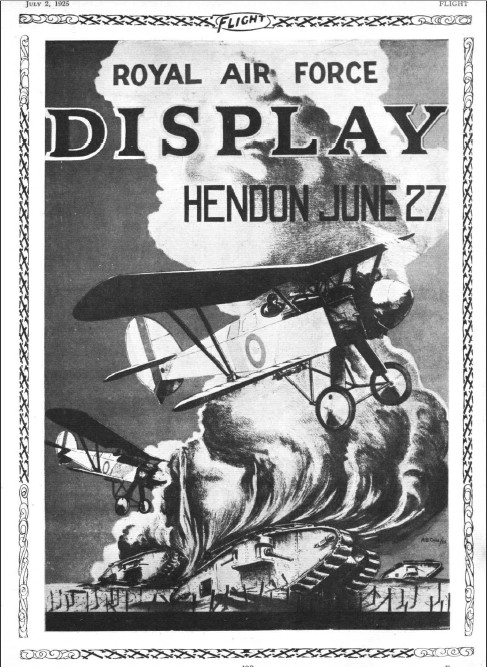
Poster for RAF Display, Hendon, 1925, published in Flight Magazine, 2 July 1925

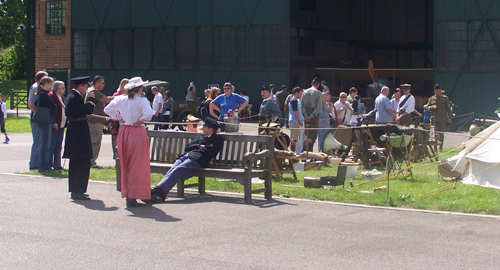
The 2008 Hendon Pageant

Grahame-White created a new company, the Grahame-White Aviation Company, taking control of more than 200 acres (0.81 km^{2}) of Colindale and converting it into what could be recognised as a proper modern airfield. The first occupants were Horatio Barber's Aeronautical Syndicate Ltd and the Bleriot flying school. From 9 to 16 September 1911, the first official UK airmail was flown between Hendon and Windsor as part of the celebrations of the coronation of King George V.

In 1912, the first Aerial Derby started and ended at Hendon. An estimated three million people turned out across London, forming a human ring around the race circuit to see the aviators fly round the metropolis. An estimated two million of these Londoners had never seen an aircraft in flight before. At Hendon Aerodrome at least 45,000 people paid for admission to the enclosures.

These annual events became as important as the Ascot and Epsom races during the London Season. By 1925, 100,000 people were coming to see the display, and it was so popular that there was talk of having to spread it over a few days. The first fatality at Hendon, reported in The Times in May 1911, was Bernard Benson (aged 23). On 25 May 1911 he fell 100 feet (30 m) from an ASL Valkyrie.

Several flying schools were located at Hendon, including Grahame-White's, and another established in 1914 by the American aviator George Beatty, in partnership with Handley Page Ltd. These continued normal operation until late 1916. On 11 September 1916, Cicely Ethel Wilkinson qualified as a pilot in a Caudron biplane at the Beatty School at the aerodrome for which she received Royal Aero Club Aviator Certificate number 3522. She was possibly the only woman to qualify as a pilot in Britain during the First World War.

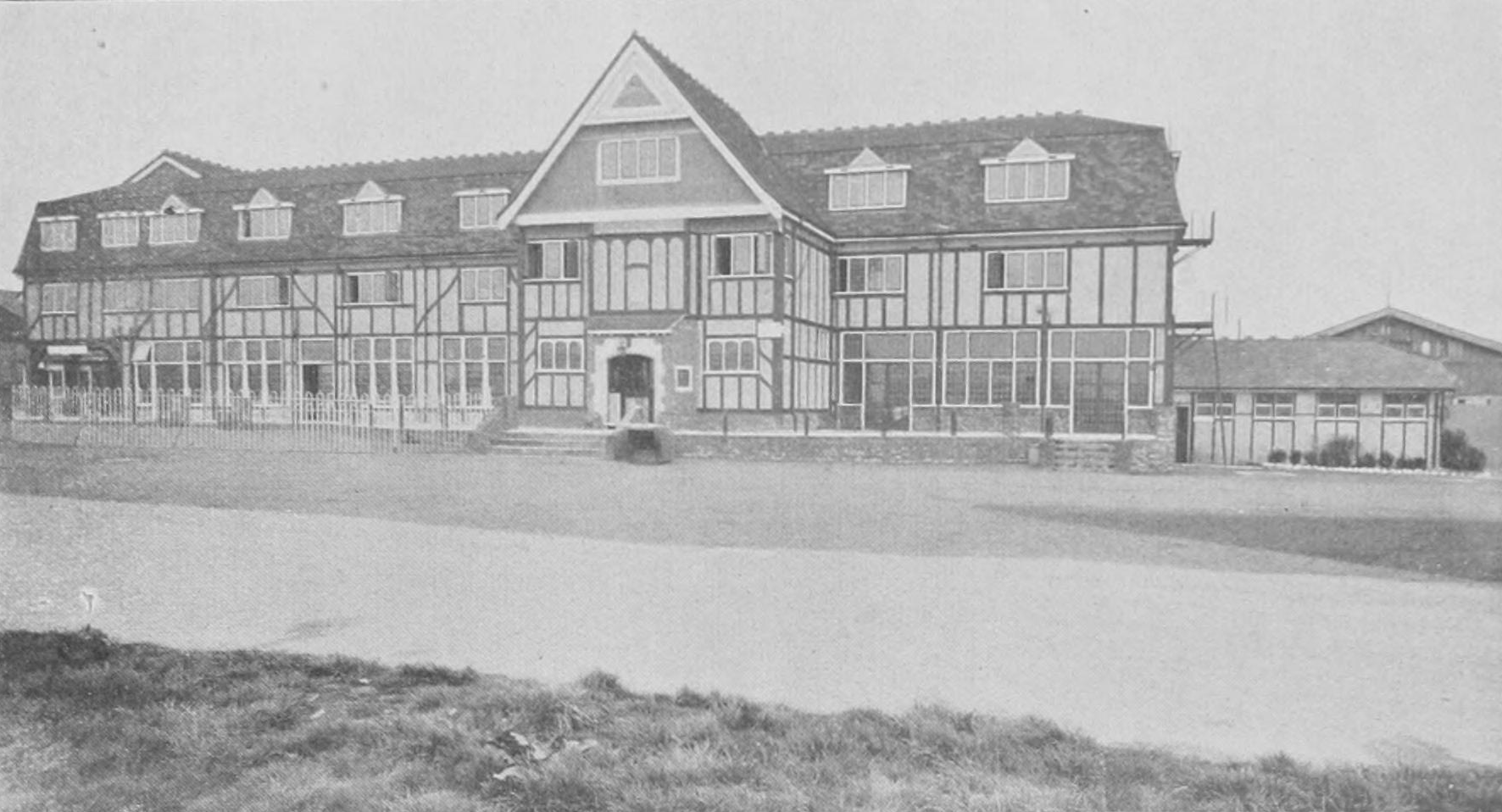
The Aerodrome Hotel, designed by H. Edmund Matthews. The building is now known as Writtle House.

In November 1916, the War Office commandeered the flying schools, after which the aerodrome trained 490 pilots. Claude Grahame-White and other members of the Royal Naval Air Service (RNAS) mounted a night defence of London in 1915, constituting the first aerial defence of London.

After the First World War, the first RAF "Pageant" was held at Hendon in 1920, and it soon became a regular event, known from 1925 as the Royal Air Force Display, and in 1938 as the Empire Air Day.

The aerodrome was briefly active during the Battle of Britain, but for most of the Second World War, was mainly used for transport activities, and flying dignitaries to and from London.

RAF Hendon had three crossed runways with magnetic headings of:

QDM 339 – 3975 x 150 feet QDM 280 – 3000 x 150 feet QDM 014 – 3060 x 150 feet

These runways were removed by 1969.

== Manufacturing at Hendon ==
Production of aeroplanes was one of the features of the aerodrome's activities under Grahame-White. During the First World War production increased rapidly. To facilitate the transportation of the 3,500 workers and materials, the Midland Railway built a spur from the embanked main line with a platform close to the main line and a loop around the airfield to the plant. It had been Claude Grahame-White's conviction that Hendon would become "the Charing Cross of our international air routes", but the Air Ministry took over in 1922, which led to a protracted and ugly legal action lasting until 1925 when Grahame-White left the site.

== End of flying and airfield closure ==
The use of Hendon as an airfield was under threat even before the Second World War, since it was considered that RAF Hendon would become an obvious target for enemy bombing raids. After the war the airfield was increasingly unsuitable, particularly because the runways were too short, and the proximity of large residential areas made matters worse. The RAF argued for the military importance of the complex into the 1950s, in case future developments in aviation technology might render the base suitable again, but eventually Hendon Borough Council and the London County Council were able to argue that houses were needed far more than the aerodrome. The last flying unit, the Metropolitan Communication Squadron, left Hendon in November 1957.

The entrance to the aerodrome can be seen in "the parade" scene in the 1967 film The Dirty Dozen, with at one point a Kirby Cadet glider of the then-resident 617 Volunteer Gliding School of the Air Training Corps launching in the background. Late in 1968, when two of the three runways had been removed, a Blackburn Beverley was flown in to be an exhibit at the new RAF Museum: this was the last aircraft to land at Hendon. The RAF station finally closed on 1 April 1987.

The site of the aerodrome is now occupied by the Grahame Park housing estate, Hendon Police College, and the RAF Museum which is situated on the southeast side of the site.

== Units ==
The following squadrons were based at Hendon at various points in the aerodrome's active military service:

- No. 24 Squadron RAF
- No. 31 Squadron RAF
- No. 81 Squadron RAF
- No. 116 Squadron RAF
- No. 248 Squadron RAF
- No. 257 (Burma) Squadron RAF
- No. 271 Squadron RAF
- No. 504 (County of Nottingham) Squadron AAF
- No. 510 Squadron RAF
- No. 512 Squadron RAF
- No. 575 Squadron RAF
- No. 600 (City of London) Squadron AAF
- No. 601 (County of London) Squadron AAF
- No. 604 (County of Middlesex) Squadron AAF
- No. 610 (County of Chester) Squadron AAF
- No. 611 (West Lancashire) Squadron AAF
- No. 661 Squadron RAF

Units;

- 'B' Flight of No. 1 Anti-Aircraft Co-operation Unit RAF
- No. 1 Aircraft Delivery Flight RAF (1941–42)
- No. 1 Camouflage Unit (1940–42)
- No. 1 Radio Fitting Unit (1940–41)
- 18th Wing School of Instruction
- Detachment of No. 19 Reserve Squadron (1916)
- No. 29 Training Squadron (1918)
- No. 50 Group Communication Flight RAF (1939)
- No. 52 (Army Co-operation) Wing RAF
- No. 61 Fighter Wing Servicing Unit
- No. 62 Fighter Wing Servicing Unit
- 86th (Communications) Wing (1918–19)
- Detachment of No. 91 (Forward) Staging Post (1944)
- No. 116 (Transport) Wing RAF
- No. 142 Gliding School RAF (1950–53)
- No. 151 (Fighter) Wing RAF
- No. 405 (Fleet Fighter) Flight RAF
- No. 617 Gliding School RAF (1958–68)
- No. 1316 (Dutch Communications) Flight RAF (1944-?) became No. 1316 (Transport) Flight RAF (?-1946)
- No. 1416 (Reconnaissance) Flight RAF (1941)
- No. 1697 (Air Despatch Letter Service) Flight RAF (1944)
- No. 1958 Reserve Air Observation Post Flight RAF (1949–57)
- 'A' Equipment Depot (Temporary) (1937–38) became 'A' Temporary MU (1938–39)
- Allied Flight (1944–46)
- Blenheim Conversion Flight (1939–40)
- Fleet Air Service Squadron (FASRON)-200 (U.S Navy)
- Hendon Aircraft Acceptance Park (1917) became No. 2 (Hendon) Aircraft Acceptance Park (1917–19)
- No. 2 (Hendon) AAP Communications Flight became The Communication Squadron (1918) became No. 1 Communication Squadron (1918–19)
- Home Communication Flight (1928–33)
- Inland Area Practice Flight (1933–38)
- Metropolitan Communication Squadron RAF (1944–48, 1955–69)
- RAF Antarctic Flight (1949–51)
- RAF Reserve Command (1939)
- RAF Reserve Command Communication Flight RAF (1939)
- School of Instruction, Hendon (1916–18)
- The King's Flight RAF (1936–39)
- Transport Command Communication Flight RAF (1944–46)

== Hendon today ==
Logo

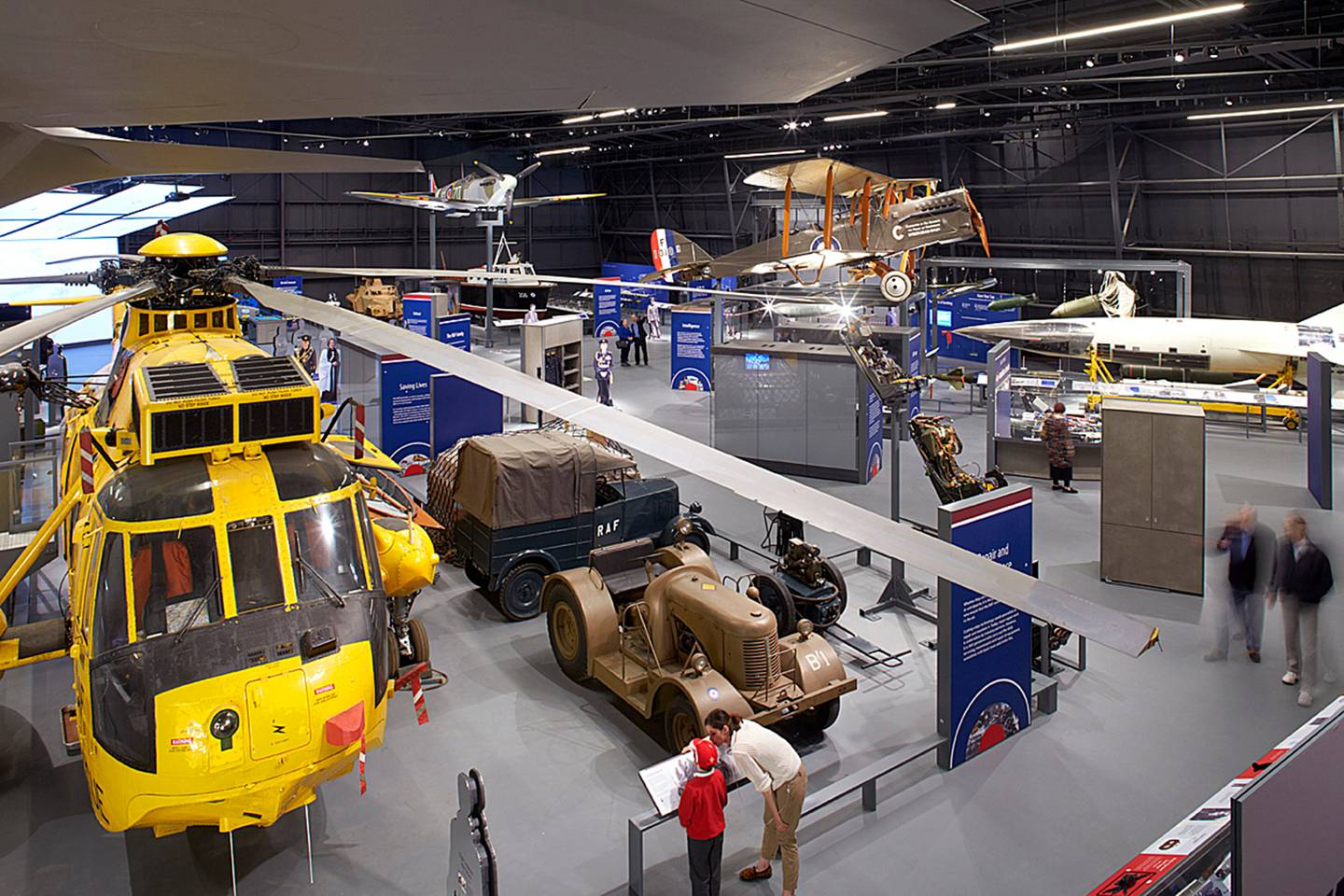
Interior

Today, Hendon houses the London branch of the Royal Air Force Museum which portrays the role of the Royal Air Force in the development of aviation and avionics in the United Kingdom. The museum consists of several buildings containing a range of permanent exhibitions including "Our Finest Hour" in the Battle of Britain Hall which was designed, produced and installed by specialist theme park and museum designers Sarner Ltd, the award-winning "Milestones of Flight" which details the major developments in flight technology from 1903 to 2003, two buildings containing various aircraft and helicopters, and part of the Grahame-White Factory, which contains many examples of original aircraft from the First World War and the early days of aviation.

The museum was officially opened at the Colindale (then part of Hendon) London site on 15 November 1972 by Queen Elizabeth II. The hangars housed 36 aircraft at opening. Over the years, the collection has increased in size substantially, and aircraft not on display at Hendon were stored or displayed at smaller local RAF station museums. The Battle of Britain Museum (later Hall) was opened by Queen Elizabeth the Queen Mother in November 1978. On 3 October 2016 the Battle of Britain Hall was permanently closed and refurbished.

As of 2012, it had over 100 aircraft, including the Avro Lancaster S-Sugar, which flew 137 night sorties. It also includes the only complete Hawker Typhoon. Added in 2018, as part of the RAF Centenary exhibitions, were a Westland Sea King helicopter (once flown by Prince William, Duke of Cambridge), a Gnat jet trainer of the Red Arrows, and a full-scale mock-up of the F-35 Lightning II stealth fighter.
