= Donald Richberg =

American lawyer

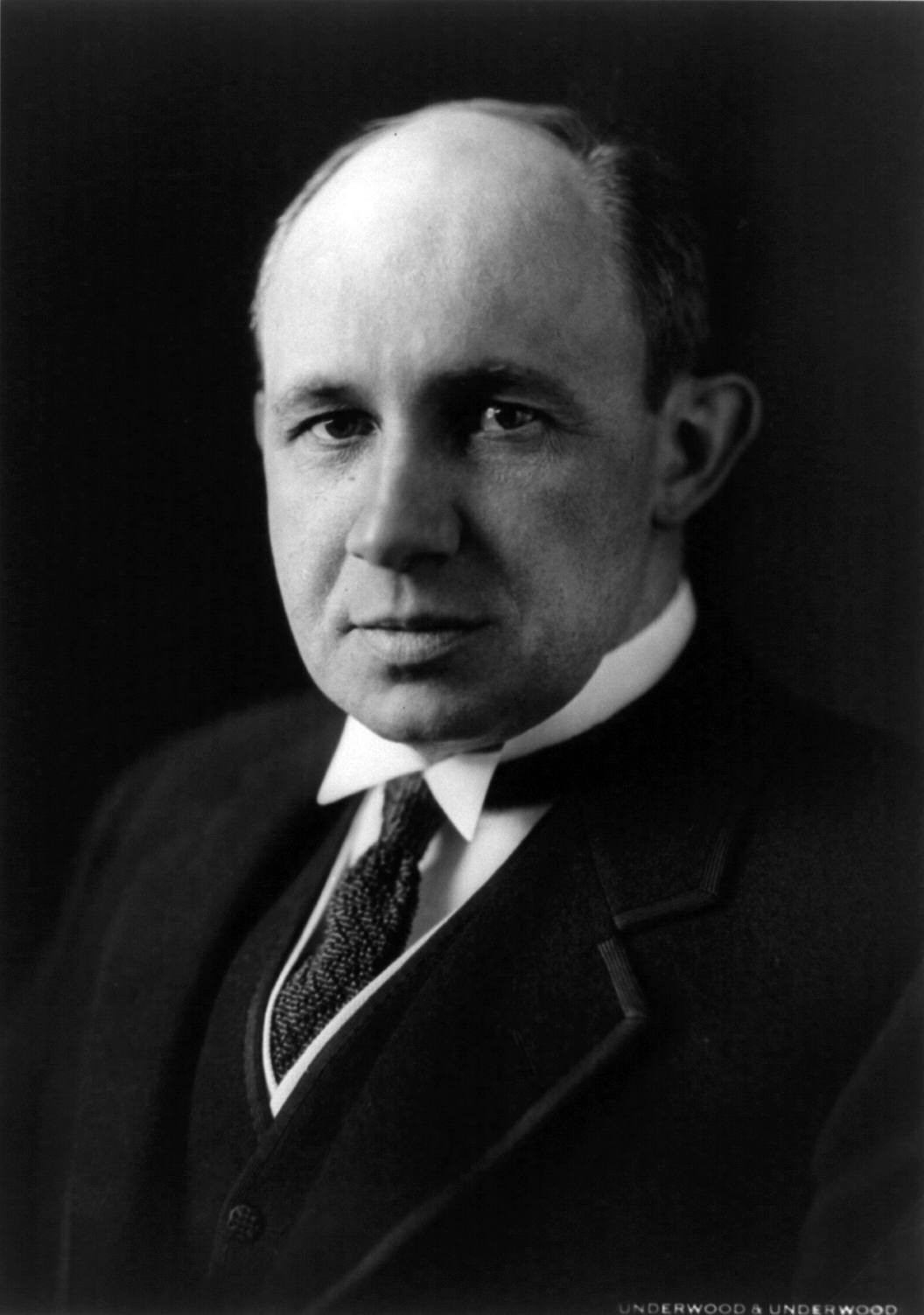
- Donald R. Richberg in 1929
- Born: Donald Randall Richberg; July 10, 1881; Knoxville, Tennessee, U.S.
- Died: November 27, 1960 (aged 79); Charlottesville, Virginia, U.S.
- Occupations: Author; Attorney; Federal civil servant
- Spouses: Elizabeth Harriet Herrick (m. 1917, divorced) Lynette Mulvey (m. 1924, divorced): Florence Weed (surv. 1960)
- Children: Eloise Richberg Campbell (by Florence Weed)
- Parent(s): John Carl and Eloise Olivia (née Randall) Richberg
- Relatives: Leda Richberg-Hornsby (sister)

Donald Randall Richberg (July 10, 1881 - November 27, 1960) was an American attorney, civil servant, and author who was one of President Franklin D. Roosevelt's key aides and who played a critical role in the New Deal. He co-wrote the National Industrial Recovery Act, was general counsel and executive director of the National Recovery Administration. He also co-authored the Railway Labor Act, the Norris-LaGuardia Act, and the Taft-Hartley Act.

== Early life and career ==
Donald Richberg was born in July 1881 in Knoxville, Tennessee, to John Carl and Eloise Olivia (née Randall) Richberg. His grandfather, Louis Richberg, and his father had migrated from Germany to the U.S. in 1851. His grandfather set up shop as a merchant in New York City before moving to Chicago, Illinois, in 1854 and starting a meatpacking business. Richberg's father became a corporate attorney and later represented the City of Chicago. His grandmother, Mirenda Briggs Randall, and his mother were both physicians. His sister was the aviator Leda Richberg-Hornsby.

Donald Richberg graduated from a Chicago public high school, received a bachelor's degree from the University of Chicago in 1901, and a J.D. from Harvard University in 1904. He met Elizabeth Harriet Herrick while at Harvard, and they married in 1906; they separated in 1915, and divorced in 1917 after she left him. He soon married Lynette Mulvey, but they divorced in 1924. The same year, he married Florence Weed (she survived him). They had one daughter.

Richberg and his father established a law firm, Richberg & Richberg, in Chicago. In 1913, Harold L. Ickes joined the firm. His increasingly ill father gave up the practice of law in 1915, and Morgan Davies and John S. Lord joined the firm (now called Richberg, Ickes, Davies & Lord). He was named a special state's attorney from 1913 to 1915 and assisted the City of Chicago with its extensive litigation against the People's Gas Company, and from 1916 to 1919 was a special master for a Chicago city court of chancery.

Richberg's first foray into politics was in 1905. Becoming involved in progressive politics, he became a close associate of Jane Addams and Charles Edward Merriam, and campaigned heavily for Edward Fitzsimmons Dunne in the mayoral race that fall. Along with Ickes, he helped form the Progressive-Republican League of Illinois, and became an active member of the Progressive Party nationally.

=== Great Railroad Strike of 1922 ===
In 1922, Richberg became nationally famous for his involvement in the Great Railroad Strike. In 1920, Richberg became general counsel for the Railway Employees' Department. In this capacity, he served as the primary attorney for the striking railway unions, and led the opposition to the "Daughtery injunction." Deeply angered by what he perceived to be the injunction's unconstitutional infringement on worker rights, Richberg co-authored legislation which in 1926 was enacted as the Railway Labor Act. In 1926, Richberg became counsel for the Railway Labor Executives' Association, a lobbying group of railway unions. In this capacity, he helped draft the Norris-La Guardia Act, federal legislation which was enacted by Congress in 1932 and which banned labor injunctions. In an attempt to injure the bill's chances for passage, Secretary of Labor William N. Doak (in a meeting which included representatives of the National Association of Manufacturers) offered Richberg a federal judgeship if he would end his support for the bill. Richberg refused. His experiences drafting these successful federal laws led many to consider Richberg to be the foremost expert on labor law by 1932.

== Federal service ==
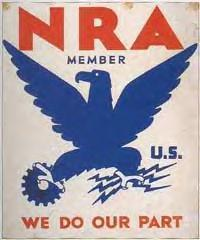
Blue Eagle poster produced by the National Recovery Administration. The poster would be displayed by employers agreeing to participate in NRA industry codes of fair trade.

In September 1932, Richberg, Ickes, Fred C. Howe, Felix Frankfurter, and Henry A. Wallace organized the National Progressive League to support New York Governor Franklin D. Roosevelt for President of the United States. After Roosevelt's election in November 1932, Richberg worked on the presidential transition team and for the new administration during the Hundred Days, drafting legislation. In this capacity Richberg was called upon to help draft the National Industrial Recovery Act (NIRA) along with Hugh S. Johnson, Raymond Moley, Rexford Tugwell, Jerome Frank, Charles Wyzanski and Bernard Baruch. Moley asked Richberg to assist him in putting final touches on the bill after various competing drafts had been reconciled, and Richberg was largely responsible for drafting Title I, Section 7(a)—which guaranteed collective bargaining rights for workers and unions.

=== National Recovery Administration and Presidential councils ===
On June 20, 1933, at the request of Hugh S. Johnson, President Roosevelt appointed Richberg general counsel of the National Recovery Administration (NRA), the agency established to implement NIRA. Richberg greatly feared that the Act he had helped author was unconstitutional, and spent much of his time in office trying to avoid bringing cases to trial or allowing them to advance through the appellate courts As general counsel, Richberg also was tasked with implementing and defending Section 7(a). Richberg, like NRA Administrator Hugh Johnson, believed Section 7(a) would be self-implementing. But both men were proven wrong: A massive wave of union organizing occurred, and employer resistance to Section 7(a) rights led to employer and union violence, strikes, and general strikes that threatened to disrupt economic recovery. On August 5, 1933, just 46 days after the passage of the NIRA, President Roosevelt established the National Labor Board (NLB) to take over the implementation of Section 7(a). Richberg openly opposed the National Labor Board and its successor agency (the "first" National Labor Relations Board, established on June 29, 1934). In direct contradiction of NLB policy and rulings, he publicly declared that Section 7(a) did not prohibit company unions or the closed shop, opposed the NLB's concept of representational exclusivity, opposed any attempt to impose a requirement of good faith bargaining on employers. Even as a national strike of 200,000 auto workers seemed imminent in February 1934, Richberg joined with Johnson to issue a "clarification" of Section 7(a) in which they declared that company unions were acceptable under federal labor policy.

On June 30, 1934, President Roosevelt announced that Richberg was taking a leave of absence from the NRA to become director of the newly created Industrial Emergency Committee. Roosevelt was experimenting with a number of coordinating bodies to assist in coordinating economic recovery efforts. He created an Executive Council on July 11, 1933, composed of most Cabinet heads and the leaders of most newly created economic recovery agencies "to provide for the orderly presentation of business and to coordinate inter-agency problems of organization and work of the new governmental agencies". On November 17, 1933, he created a similar coordinating body called the National Emergency Council, composed of four key Cabinet secretaries and the heads of six economic recovery agencies, to coordinate and make "more efficient and productive the work of the numerous field agencies of the Government established under, and for the purpose of carrying into effect" the provisions of the National Industrial Recovery Act, the Agricultural Adjustment Act, and the Federal Emergency Relief Act. Now, through an Executive Order, Roosevelt made Richberg director of the Industrial Emergency Committee, composed of the secretaries of the Interior and Labor and the heads of the NRA and Federal Emergency Relief Administration, to "make recommendations to the President ... with respect to problems of relief, public works, labor disputes and industrial recovery and to study and coordinate the handling of joint problems affecting these activities." At the same time, Roosevelt put Richberg in charge of the Executive Council and the National Emergency Council, placed him over the Cabinet. His extensive power earned Richberg the sobriquet of "assistant president." But Richberg's role didn't last. The Executive Council was merged with the National Emergency Council and the Industrial Emergency Committee was made a subcommittee of the new body in October 1934. By the end of December 1934, Richberg had resigned from his role as "assistant president" after political attacks from others in the administration.

=== Return to NRA ===
Richberg also returned to the NRA. NRA Administrator Hugh Johnson was showing signs of mental breakdown due to the extreme pressure and workload of running the National Recovery Administration. Johnson's increasingly erratic behavior, frequent policy about-faces, and abusive behavior toward subordinates aliented Richberg, who began asking President Roosevelt to fire or replace the Administrator. After two meetings with Roosevelt and an abortive resignation attempt, Johnson resigned on September 24, 1934. Three days later, Roosevelt replaced the position of Administrator with a new National Industrial Recovery Board, of which Richberg was named executive director. As head of the Board, however, Richberg engaged in double-dealing, lying to the President about the views of his subordinates and agreeing to his staff's requests that he raise issues with the President and later refusing to do so. He also took increasingly pro-business policy stands. For example, although a majority of the National Industrial Recovery Board had agreed to let the automobile industry code lapse (so that a new code might be negotiated) and to abolish the Automobile Labor Board, Richberg overruled the majority and persuaded Roosevelt to continue the status quo. Labor unions and the NRA staff were outraged. Nonetheless, when the chairmanship of the National Industrial Recovery Board came open in the spring of 1935, labor and most Roosevelt advisors grudgingly agreed to ask Roosevelt to name Richberg the new chairman. With the NIRA due to sunset on June 15, 1935, Richberg went ahead with plans to reorganize NRA in order to improve the law's chances of reauthorization. But on May 27, 1935, the U.S. Supreme Court held Title I of the Act unconstitutional in Schechter Poultry Corp. v. United States, 295 U.S. 495 (1935), making the issue moot. A severability clause enabled NRA to continue functioning to some degree, but the vast majority of its regulatory work was now no longer possible. President Roosevelt terminated the Board on June 15, 1935, and replaced it with an Administrator again. Richberg resigned the next day.

== Later life ==
Richberg's later life was marked by increasing conservatism and anti-labor attitudes, the practice of law, and writing. He attempted in 1936 to establish his own law firm in Washington, D.C., but this failed. He joined an existing firm, which took the name Davies, Richberg, Beebe, Busick & Richardson. He was frequently consulted by members of Congress for his expertise in drafting legislation, and played a major role in authoring the Taft-Hartley Act. In 1956, he helped author a bill introduced into the Virginia General Assembly which would have stopped school desegregation. From 1949 to 1952 he was a lecturer at the University of Virginia School of Law.

Donald Richberg died at his home in Charlottesville, Virginia, on November 27, 1960.

== Writings ==
Richberg was a widely published essayist, novelist, poet, and non-fiction author. His more well-known books include:

- Compulsory Unionism: The New Slavery. Published posthumously, 1972.
- Donald R. Richberg's story: The Mexican Oil Seizure. Arrow Press, 1939.
- G. Hovah Explains. National Home Library Foundation, 1940.
- Government and Business Tomorrow. Harper & Brothers, 1943.
- Guilty!: The Confession of Franklin D. Roosevelt. Doubleday, Doran & Company, 1936.
- In the Dark. Forbes & company, 1912.
- Labor Union Monopoly: A Clear and Present Danger. H. Regnery Co., 1957.
- A Man Of Purpose. Kessinger Publishing, 1922.
- The Murder of a Candidate. National Small Business Men's Association, 1952.
- My Hero: The Autobiography of Donald Richberg. G.P. Putnam's Sons, 1954.
- Old Faith and Fancies New. Jarman Press, 1949.
- Poems of Donald R. Richberg. American Natural Gas Company, 1959.
- The Rainbow. Doubleday, Doran and Company, Inc., 1936.
- The Shadow Men. Forbes & Company, 1911.
- Tents of the Mighty. Willett, Clark & Colby, 1930.
- Who Wins In November. 1916.

He also wrote the popular song Smoke Dreams.
