= William A. Grew =

American dramatist

William Albert Grew (August 26, 1885 - October 26, 1967) was an American actor, sketch-writer and revue playwright who wrote, directed, and performed in nine Broadway productions from 1924 to 1931. His and his wife, actress Gwendolyn Pates, had a stock company called the Grew-Pates Players, performing in the United States and Canada from 1914 to 1920.

== Plays ==
- The Sap 1924 - twice filmed
- The Mating Season 18 July 1927, Selwyn
- My Girl Friday at the Theatre Republic 1929
- Nice Women at the Longacre Theatre, 1929
- She Lived Next to the Firehouse 1931 - William A. Grew and Harry Delf
