= Wright Flying School =

American aviation school

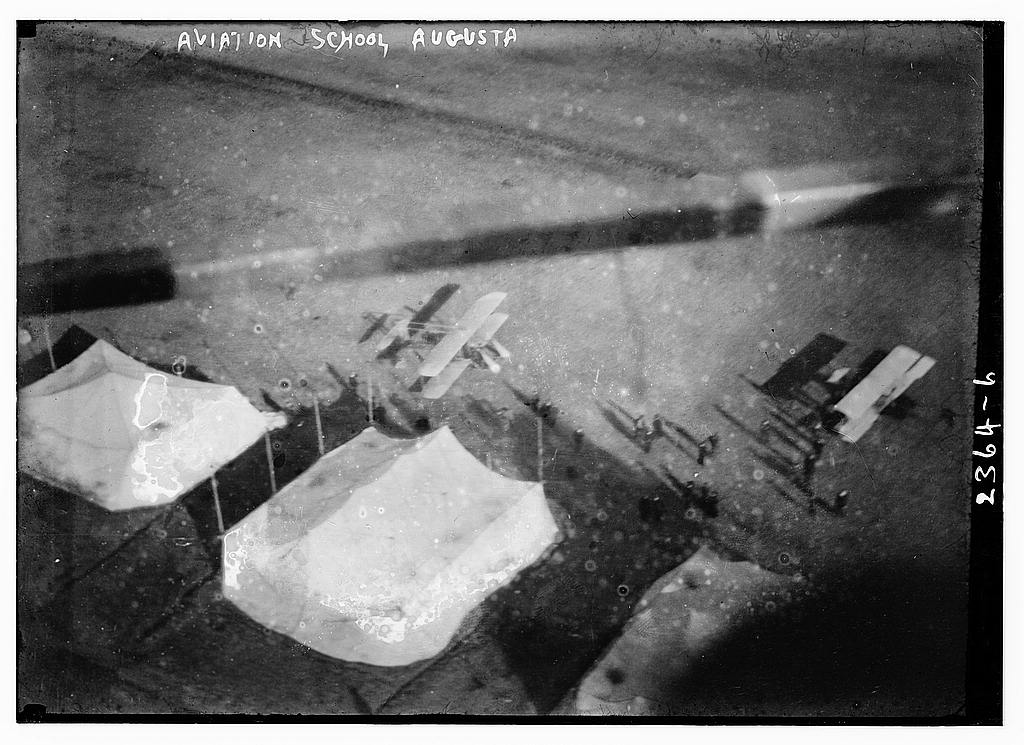
- Facility in Augusta, Georgia, c. 1911

Information
- Established: March 19, 1910
- Closed: 1916
- Affiliation: Wright Company

The Wright Flying School, also known as the Wright School of Aviation, was operated by the Wright Company from 1910 to 1916 and trained 119 individuals to fly Wright airplanes.

== History ==
Orville Wright began training students on March 19, 1910, in Montgomery, Alabama, at a site that later became Maxwell Air Force Base. With the onset of milder weather that May, the school relocated to Huffman Prairie Flying Field near Dayton, Ohio, where the Wrights developed practical aviation in 1904 and 1905 and where the Wright Company tested its airplanes. The school also had a facility in Augusta, Georgia, run by Frank Coffyn.

Some of the earliest graduates became members of the Wright Exhibition Team.

== Sites ==
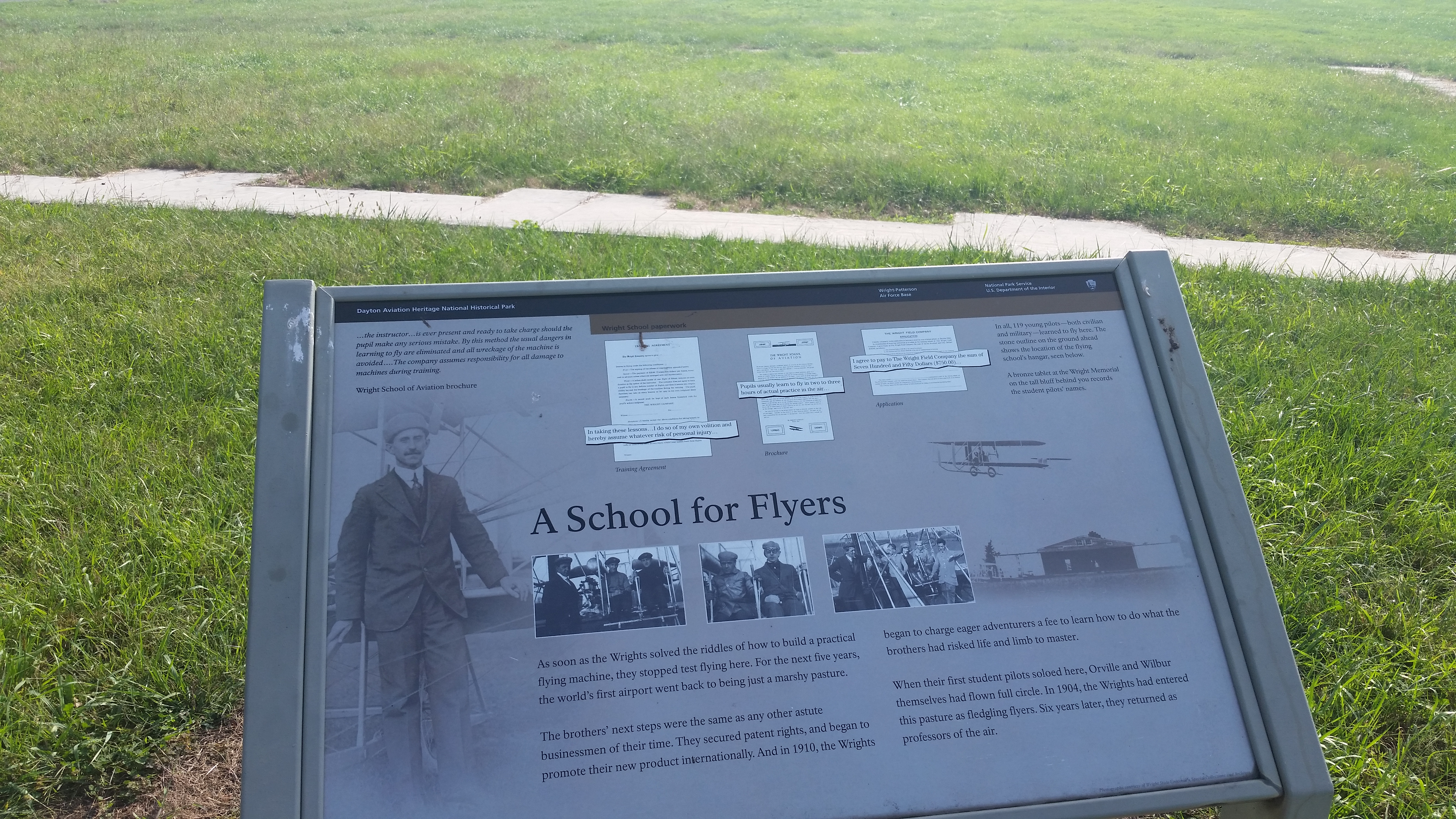
National Park Service marker at the location of the Huffman Prairie Flying Field school.

- Maxwell Air Force Base in Montgomery, Alabama
- Huffman Prairie Flying Field near Dayton, Ohio
- Augusta, Georgia

== Notable students ==
- 1st Lt. Henry H. Arnold (1886–1950)
- 1st Lt. Thomas DeWitt Milling (1887–1960)
- Calbraith Perry Rodgers (1879–1912) started on June 5, 1911.
- Oscar Brindley (1885–1918)
- Walter Richard Brookins (1889–1953)
- Howard W. Gill (1882–1912)
- Oliver LeBoutillier (1894–1983)
- Philip Orin Parmelee (1887–1912)
- Leda Richberg-Hornsby (1886–1939)
- Marjorie Stinson (1895–1975)
- Edward Stinson (1893–1932)
- J. Clifford Turpin (1886–1966)
- Arthur L. "Al" Welsh (1881–1912) learned to fly and then in the summer of 1910 became an instructor at the Wright Flying School.
- George William Beatty (1887–1955) was taught by Al Welsh, taking his first lesson on June 24, 1911, and soloing on July 23, 1911. That same day, he flew as a passenger with Welsh to establish a new American two-man flight altitude record of 1,860 feet (570 m); and on August 5, 1911, Beatty broke his own record, flying to 3,080 feet (940 m) with Percy Reynolds as his passenger.

== See also ==
- List of schools in the United States
