= Leda Richberg-Hornsby =

American aviator

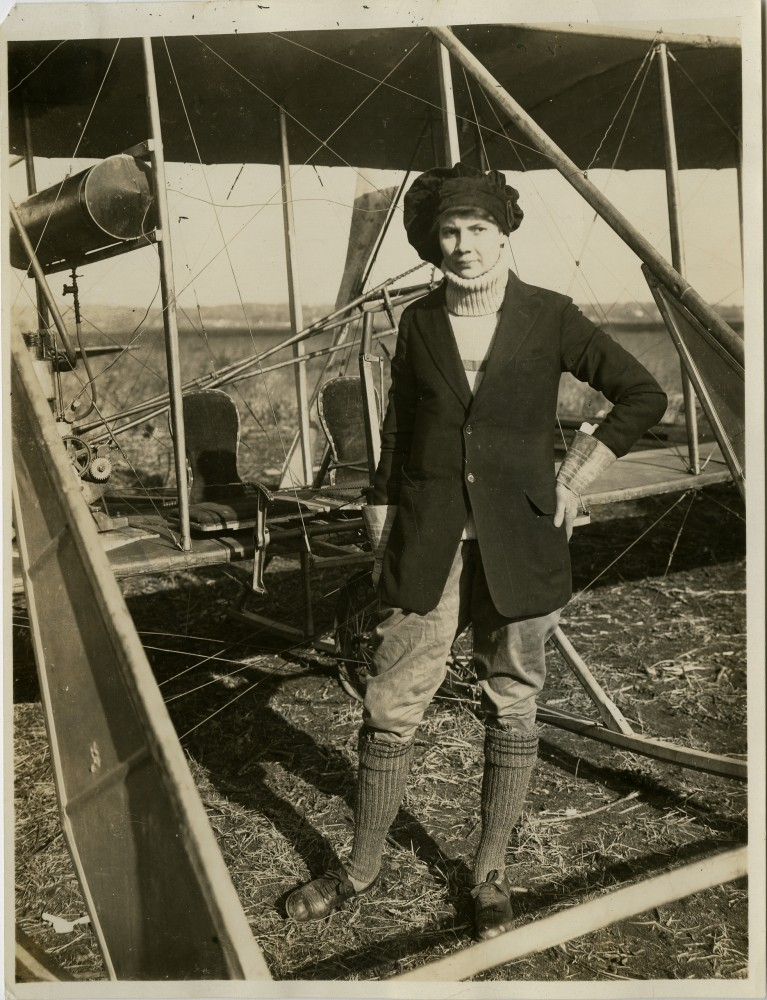
- Leda Richberg-Hornsby, 1916
- Born: November 1886; Chicago, Illinois, US
- Died: August 25, 1939 (aged 52); Chicago, Illinois, US
- Burial place: Graceland Cemetery
- Occupation: Pilot
- Spouse: Hubert Primm Hornsby
- Parent(s): Eloise Olivia Randall Richberg; John Carl Richberg
- Relatives: Donald R. Richberg (brother); Windsor V. Richberg (brother)

Leda Richberg-Hornsby (November 1886 – August 25, 1939) was an American pilot and suffragist. She was the first female graduate of the Wright Flying School in Dayton, Ohio, and the eighth woman in the United States to receive a pilot's license.

== Early life ==
Leda Richberg-Hornsby was born in November 1886 in Chicago, the youngest of three children, to Eloise Olivia Richberg (née Randall) and John Carl Richberg. Her mother was a physician, professor, writer, and suffragist. Her maternal grandmother, Marenda Briggs Randall, was also a physician and suffragist. Her father was a lawyer who also served for four years as President of the Chicago Board of Education; his administration saw the establishment of equal pay for women educators and the elimination of bible readings from schools. Richberg-Hornsby's elder brother, Donald Randall Richberg, was a lawyer and member of Franklin D. Roosevelt's administration.

Richberg-Hornsby received her early education at the Castle School in Tarrytown, New York. Following in the footsteps of her mother and grandmother, she attended medical school for three years, though without completing a degree. In May 1912, while on a trip to Racine, Wisconsin, she met Hubert Primm Hornsby, whom she married on the 23rd of that month, to the surprise of her family. The marriage was unsuccessful and the two soon separated. On February 1, 1915, she obtained a divorce on the grounds of desertion, although her husband formally denied the charge.

== Aviation career ==
Around 1913, Richberg-Hornsby became interested in flying. She began her studies with Max Lillie while living with her parents in Chicago. Following Lillie's death in September 1913, she enrolled in the Wright Flying School in Dayton, where she studied both flying and airplane construction. In March 1914, she became the school's first female graduate. That June, she passed her licensing test under the supervision of Orville Wright (who described her performance as "The prettiest flying I ever saw a beginner do") and on June 24 she received license No. 301 from the Aero Club of America.

In her early career, Richberg-Hornsby made exhibition flights at Cicero Aviation Field outside Chicago. Throughout the summer of 1915, she flew at the Mineola aviation field in New York. When that airfield was taken over by the government that fall, she transferred to Staten Island where she was active through the end of 1916.

On November 3, 1916, during an exhibition flight at Midland Beach, she suffered an accident when her biplane fell fifty feet. She was able to save herself by holding the biplane level and effecting a pancake landing. Remarkably, the only damage was a broken girder near the engine and a cut to her hand. The mishap did not seem to faze her. In an interview ten days later she explained:

I thought as I came down: "Well, this earth isn't such a pleasant place, anyhow. Maybe the next one will be better. Maybe there isn't any next one: I'll know in a minute." Then we struck, Sweetheart and I. Sweetheart is the biplane. And then we picked ourselves up, and are ready for the next flight any time.

On December 2, 1916, Richberg-Hornsby participated in a publicity stunt for the National American Woman Suffrage Association (N.A.W.S.A.). The plan, devised by Carrie Chapman Catt, was for Richberg-Hornsby to fly her biplane over President Woodrow Wilson's yacht, the Mayflower, as it came down the Hudson River toward Liberty Island for the celebration of the first lighting of the Statue of Liberty. Once over the yacht, she was to "bomb" the president with petitions from female voters of the western United States (a demographic that had largely favored Wilson in the recent, narrow 1916 election). She was accompanied by Ida Blair: welfare worker, businesswoman, and N.A.W.S.A. press publicity leader, who later founded the Women's Democratic Union. The biplane was decorated with streamers of yellow, white, and blue, the suffrage campaign colors, and a banner reading "Women Want Liberty Too." Before she could reach the president's yacht, however, the high winds forced Richberg-Hornsby to make an emergency landing in a Staten Island swamp. According to the New York Sun, the biplane was "broken winged," although Richberg-Hornsby and Blair suffered only "a few mundane bumps."

Around the same time, Richberg-Hornsby announced her intention of flying to Palm Beach, Florida, in hopes of breaking the American distance record then held by Ruth Law. Once in Palm Beach, she stated, she would start a flight school for women that would offer instruction in military observation. Neither of these plans was realized.

== WWI and beyond ==
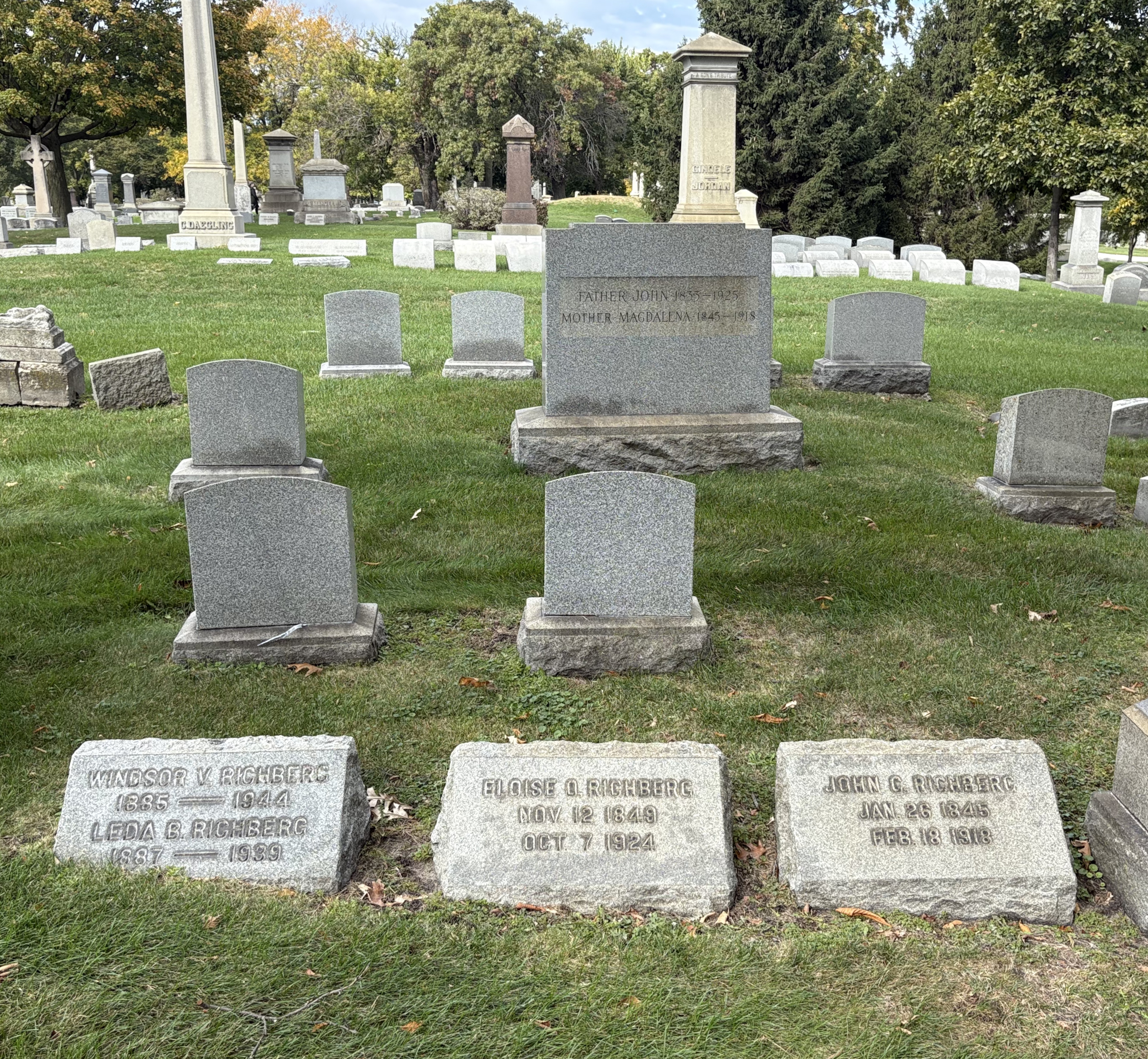
Richberg-Hornsby's grave (left) at Graceland Cemetery

In November 1916, Richberg-Hornsby earned a commission as Lieutenant in the U.S. Aviation Reserve Corps, organized by Albert Bond Lambert. She subsequently tried to join the U.S. Flying Corps in France, but the French government refused to accept a woman. A second attempt, following America's entry into the war, met with the same response.

In 1917, she was one of the "silent sentinels" who picketed the White House under the organization of the National Woman's Party, and on November 14, she was among the thirty-three women arrested and imprisoned in the Occoquan Workhouse in Virginia. Many of these women were subjected to brutal treatment, and twenty-two, including Hornsby, engaged in a hunger strike. On November 27, she was released along with the twenty-one other hunger-strikers, before the completion of her thirty-day sentence.

Around this time, she became interested in women's labor conditions. During the summer of 1919 she worked for the Woman's Land Army of America as a chauffeur for some "farmerettes" in Cold Spring Harbor. She was reportedly amused when the Army's office in Manhattan asked her "if she could drive a 'car.'" In the same interview, she expressed her intention to return to medical school in the fall in order to complete her degree.

Richberg-Hornsby ultimately returned to Chicago, where she died of heart failure on August 25, 1939. She was buried at Graceland Cemetery.

== In popular culture ==
Richberg-Hornsby is the subject of a one-act opera titled Aleda or the Flight of the Suff Bird Women, celebrating her attempt to "bomb" President Wilson's yacht. The opera was commissioned by the Musicians of Ma'alwyck, a chamber music group based in upstate New York. The music and libretto were written by composer Max Caplan, who attended nearby Union College. The opera opened on June 8, 2018, in Glenville, New York.
