= George William Beatty =

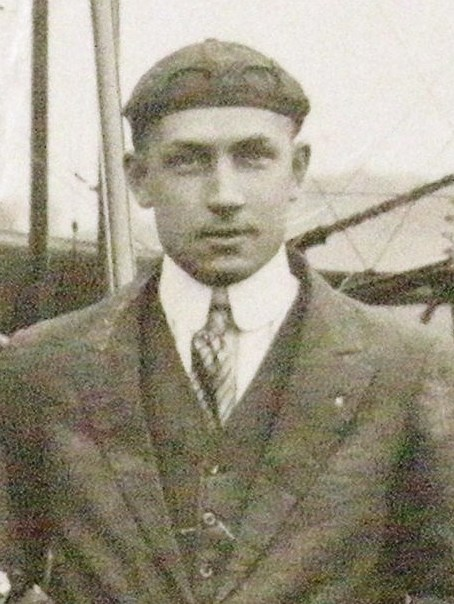
George William Beatty, 1916

George William Beatty (August 28, 1887 – February 20, 1955) was an American pioneer aviator who set early altitude and distance records, including one record set on the same day that he flew his first solo flight.

== Early life ==
Beatty was born on August 28, 1887, in Stephensburg, New Jersey. He graduated from high school in 1904 and worked in the printing industry as a linotype machine operator in New York City.

== Early aviation career ==
Beatty became involved in a gliding club in New York City, and in 1909–10 helped build a homemade Santos-Dumont Demoiselle using a three cylinder engine from Anzani.

Beatty (right) with Arthur L. Welsh, c.1911

In 1911, he attended the Wright Flying School on Long Island, where he was taught by Arthur L. Welsh. He had his first lesson on June 24, 1911 and soloed on July 23, 1911. That same day, he flew as a passenger with Welsh to establish a new American two-man flight altitude record of 1,860 feet (570 m). On August 5, 1911, Beatty broke his own record, flying to 3,080 feet (940 m) with Percy Reynolds as his passenger. On the same flight, he won a cup given by the Farman Company for flight duration.

On August 6, 1911, he flew for his license and was awarded Fédération Aéronautique Internationale (FAI) pilot certificate number 41.

At the 1911 Chicago International Aviation Meet at Grant Park, he set the new three-man endurance world record of 1 hour and 18 minutes on the August 13, 1911. He also set the American two-man endurance record of 2 hours and four minutes on the August 12, 1911, which he surpassed with a time of 3 hours and 19 minutes on August 19, 1911. His total flight time at the meet of 24 hours and 21 minutes.

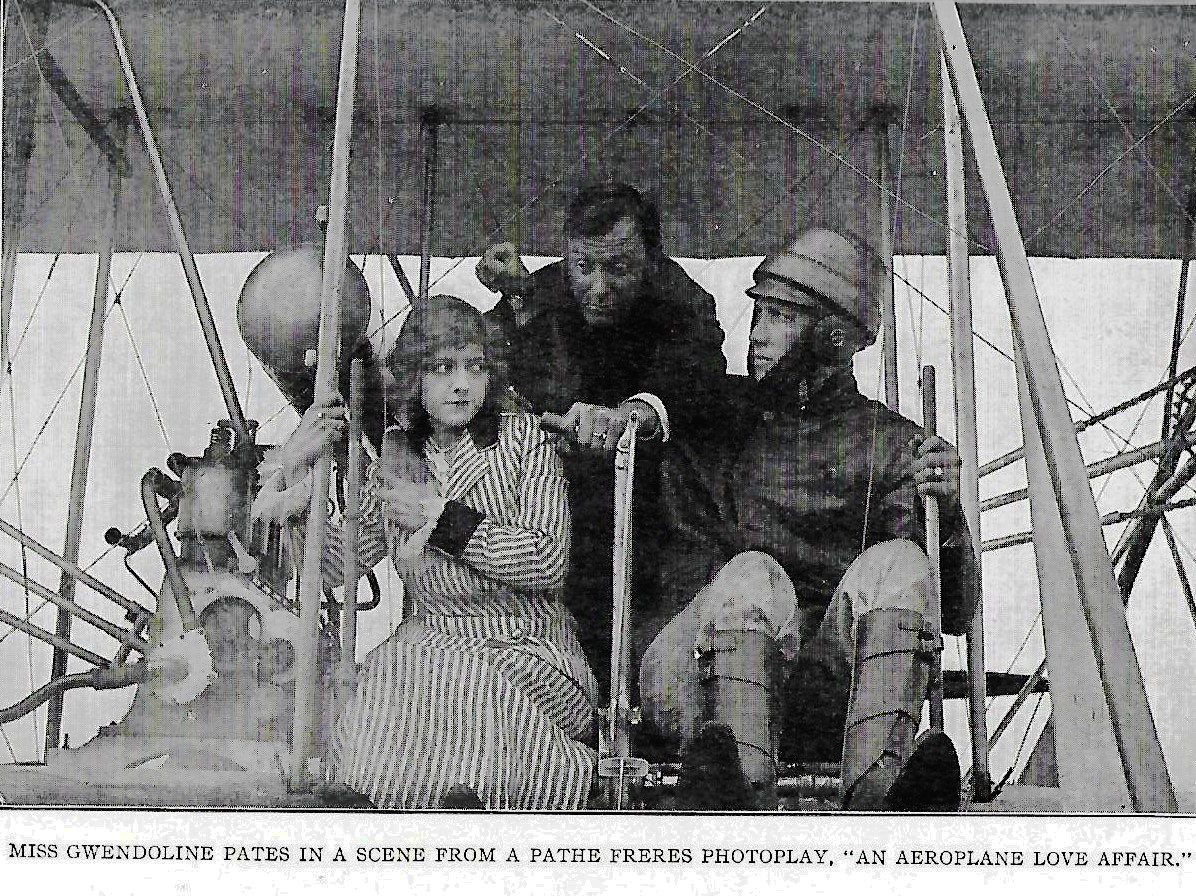
Beatty (right) with Gwendolyn Pates in the film An Aeroplane Love Affair (1912)

Beatty created a flying school on Long Island in early 1912. From this site, he became the first person to land in Manhattan when he flew into New York City and landed in Central Park on February 13, 1912. He returned to his Nassau County, New York base the next day. After the June 11, 1912, death of Al Welsh, he moved to College Park, Maryland, where he served as the chief test pilot and instructor at the United States Army Aviation School. Although not an actor, in 1912 he appeared alongside Gwendolyn Pates in a film, An Aeroplane Love Affair.

== Move to Europe ==
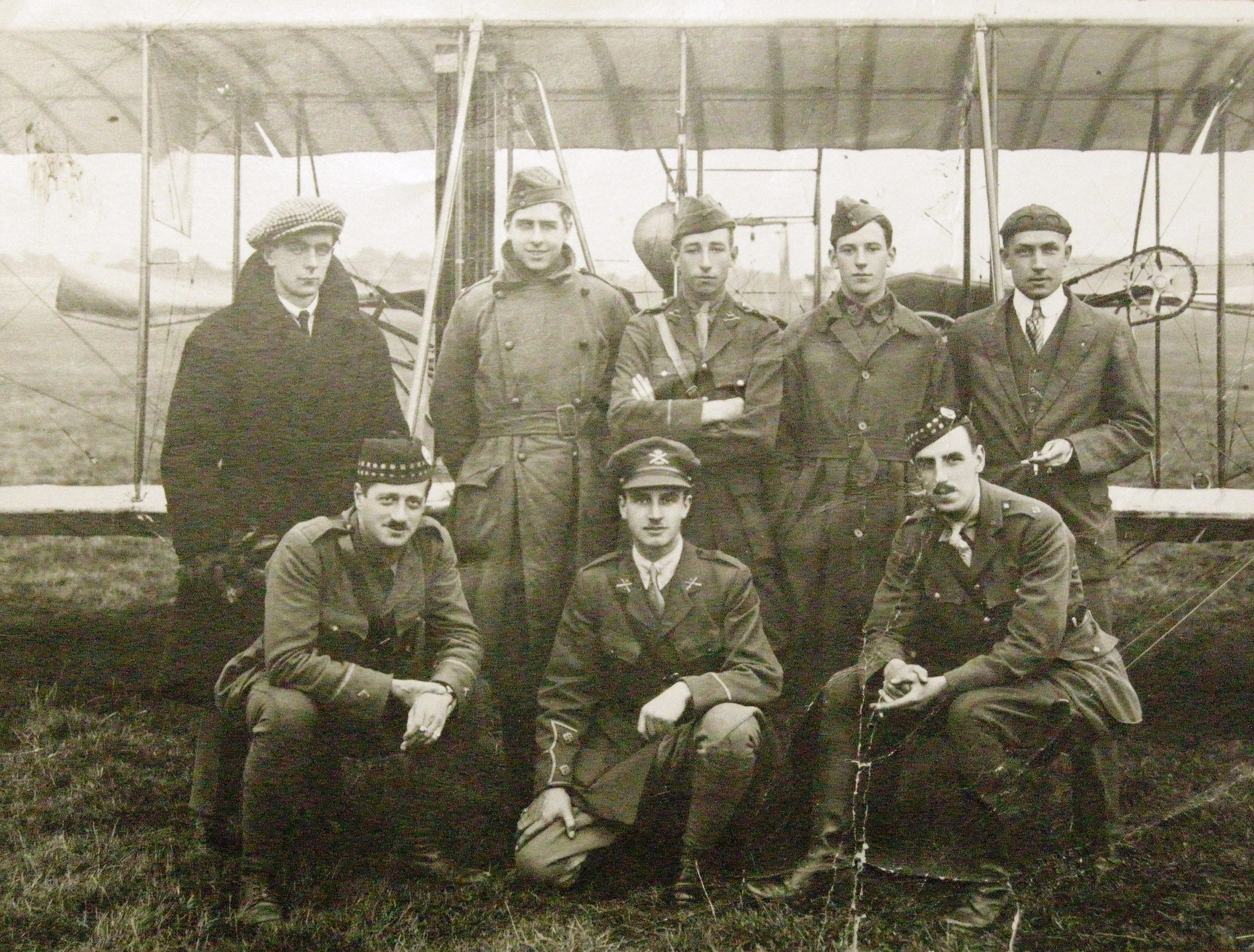
Beatty (far right) and colleague with six student pilots destined for the Royal Flying Corps, photographed at Hendon Aerodrome, August 1916. The aircraft is a Beatty-Wright (modified Wright Model B) biplane.

In 1913, Beatty moved to England, where he established a joint venture with Handley Page to create a flying school at Hendon Aerodrome in Hendon, North London. There he trained over 1,000 pilots for the Royal Flying Corps, Royal Naval Air Service and Royal Air Force. He also brought three Wright Flyers to add to the Handley Page fleet.

After World War I, in the early 1920s, Beatty started a business manufacturing engines for motorcycles. By 1923, he constructed a racing motorcycle that won the Tour de France.

== Return to the United States ==
The Great Depression ended the motorcycle business and Beatty returned to the United States. He had great difficulty finding work and did not attain a full-time job until he was hired by the Hughes Printing Company of East Stroudsburg, Pennsylvania in 1934, working his way up to superintendent.

He remained at the job until his death on February 20, 1955 at age 67. He was buried in Stroudsburg, Pennsylvania at the Laurelwood Cemetery.
