= Hazlehurst & Sons =

19th-century soap and alkali manufacturers

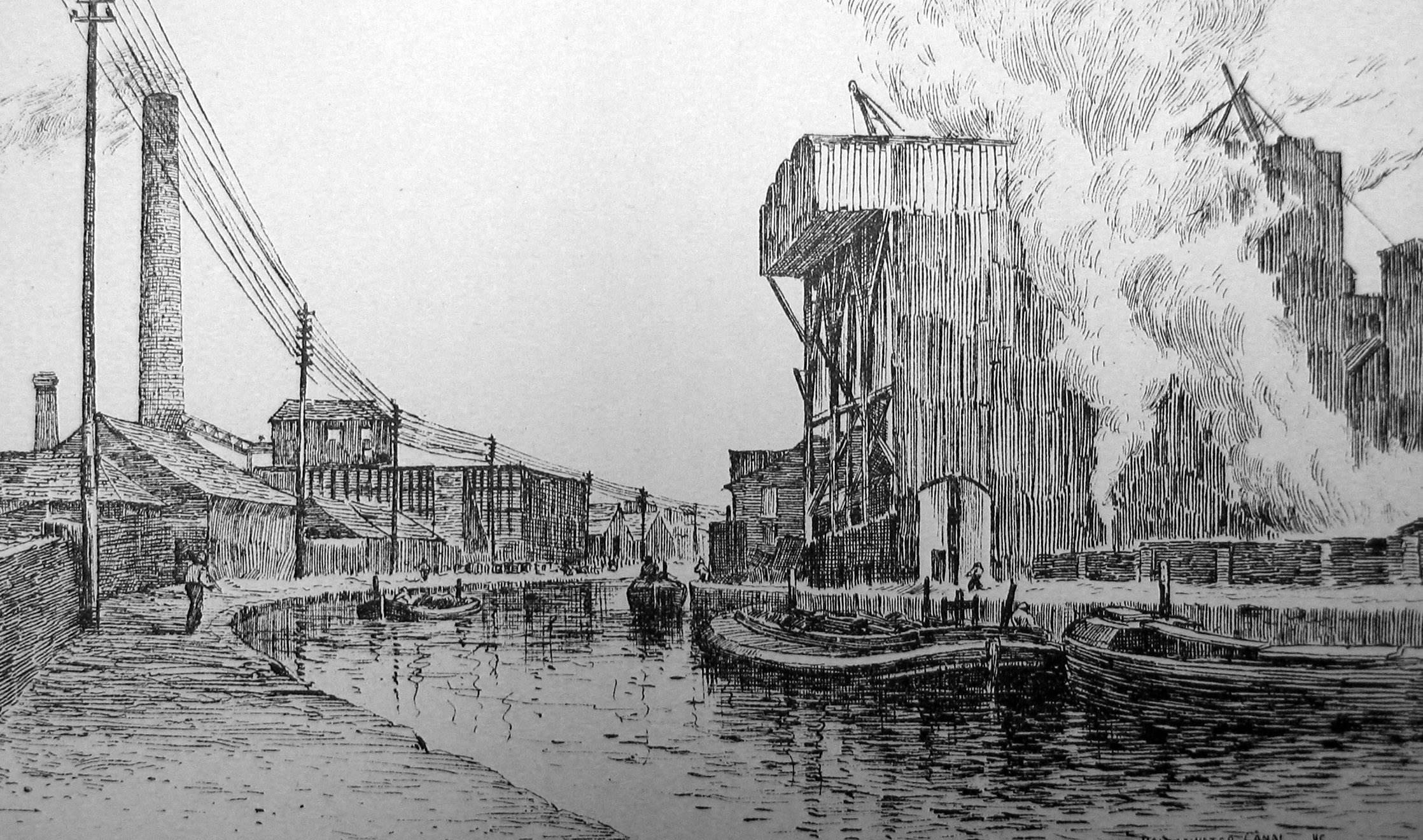
Bridgewater Canal, Runcorn with Hazlehurst's factory on the left and Johnson's on the right

Hazlehurst & Sons was a company making soap and alkali in Runcorn, Cheshire, England in the 19th century and in the early years of the 20th century. The family was also largely responsible for the growth of Methodism in the town during the 19th century.

== Soap and alkali business ==
By 1816 Thomas Hazlehurst senior (27 February 1779 – 18 February 1842) had established a soapery (a factory making soap) on the north bank of the Bridgewater Canal between the canal and High Street in Runcorn, called Camden Works. Initially the alkali necessary for the production of soap would have been made from natural sources, such as kelp. However, by 1830 it was manufactured synthetically by the Leblanc process. In 1836 an enormous chimney at least 102 yards (93 m) high was built at the factory to disperse the pollution resulting from the use of this process. The business was very successful and in 1832 it was in the top 20 of the soap-making businesses in the United Kingdom. Thomas Hazlehurst senior died in 1842 and the business was continued by his four sons, William (c. 1801–2 August 1859), John (12 March 1803 – 29 August 1885), Thomas junior (17 April 1816 – 14 July 1876) and Charles (27 November 1819 – 14 December 1878).

William retired from the business in 1849 and John retired in 1857 leaving Thomas junior and Charles to run it. The day-to-day business was conducted mainly by Charles, while Thomas junior concentrated on his religious interests (see below). It continued to thrive and in 1866, their best year, each brother 'took home' a profit of £11,570. Following the deaths of Thomas junior and Charles, the business was run by a board of directors. In 1891, in common with most of the other factories using the Leblanc process, the firm became part of the United Alkali Company. The firm's soaps continued to win awards at various international exhibitions until in 1911 the business was sold to Lever Brothers. Soap and alkali making then ceased, and the factory was taken over and used as a tannery (Camden Tannery). The trade name continued to be used by Lever Brothers until the 1930s.

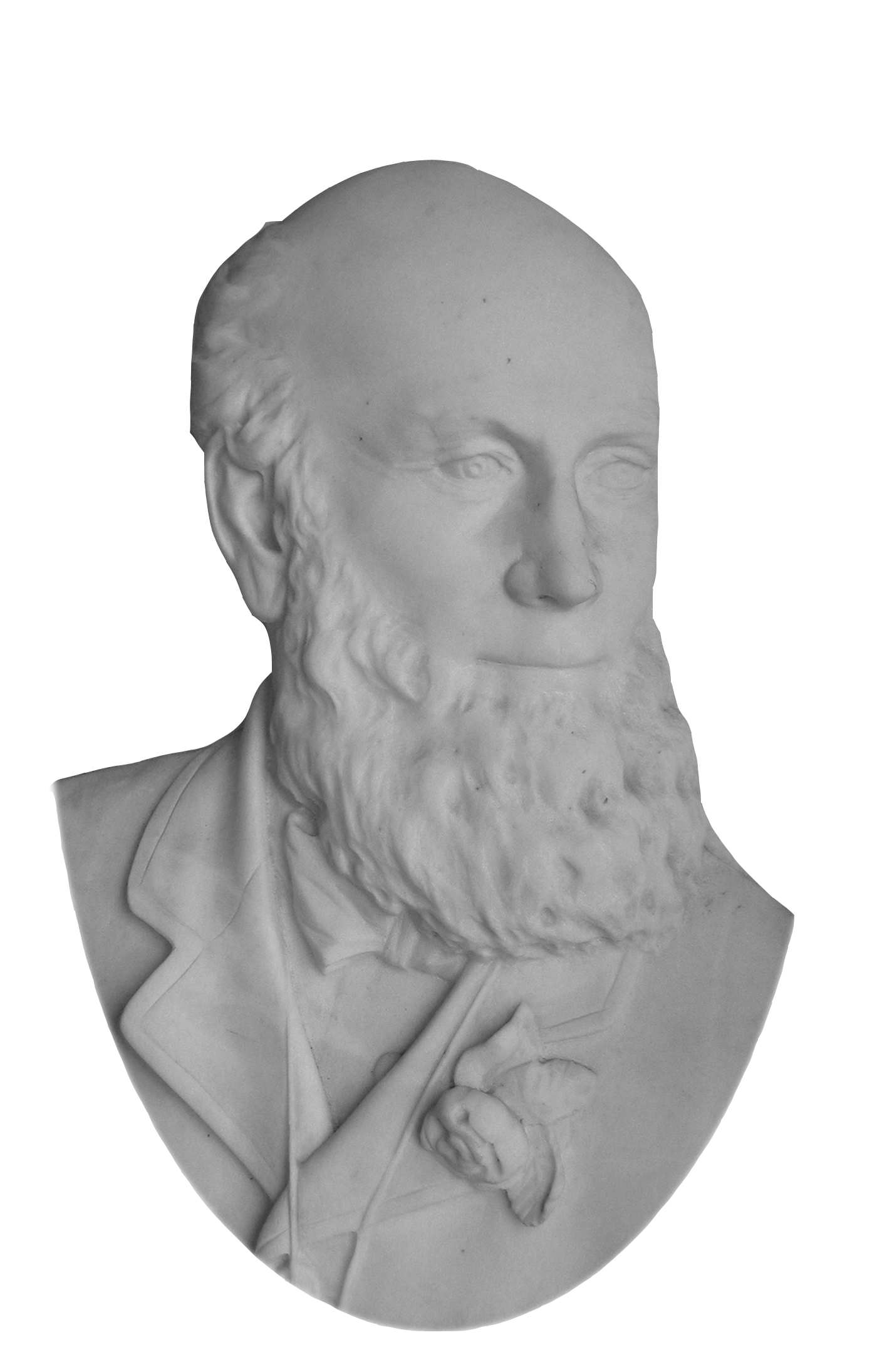
Thomas Hazlehurst junior

== Methodism ==
In 1806 Thomas Hazlehurst senior was converted from the Church of England to Methodism following the death of an infant daughter, Eliza. At this time there were very few Methodists in the town. However, largely due to his influence, the movement grew and in 1827 it was sufficiently prosperous to build a substantial chapel, Brunswick Chapel, in the town. All four sons were influential in the Methodist movement in the town, in particular Thomas Hazlehurst junior. In addition to his chapel duties, Thomas Hazlehurst junior wrote and distributed free of charge a large number of sermons. He also paid, wholly or substantially, for the building of some 11-12 Methodist chapels and 2–3 schools in Widnes, Runcorn and the villages of north Cheshire, including Frodsham and Kingsley. He was frequently invited to lay the foundation stones of Wesleyan chapels and schools. On each occasion he made a rousing speech and gave a generous donation and received in return a silver commemorative trowel or mallet. In all, he collected around 100 of these items.

== Civic matters ==
While Thomas junior concentrated mainly on religious matters, his father and brothers were all involved to a greater or lesser degree in the civic concerns of the town. Thomas senior was a member of the Select Vestry and involved with numerous committees responsible for running the town. William and Charles were both appointed as Improvement commissioners when the Board of Commissioners (effectively the town council) was instituted in 1852.
