= Arthur L. Welsh =

American aviation pioneer

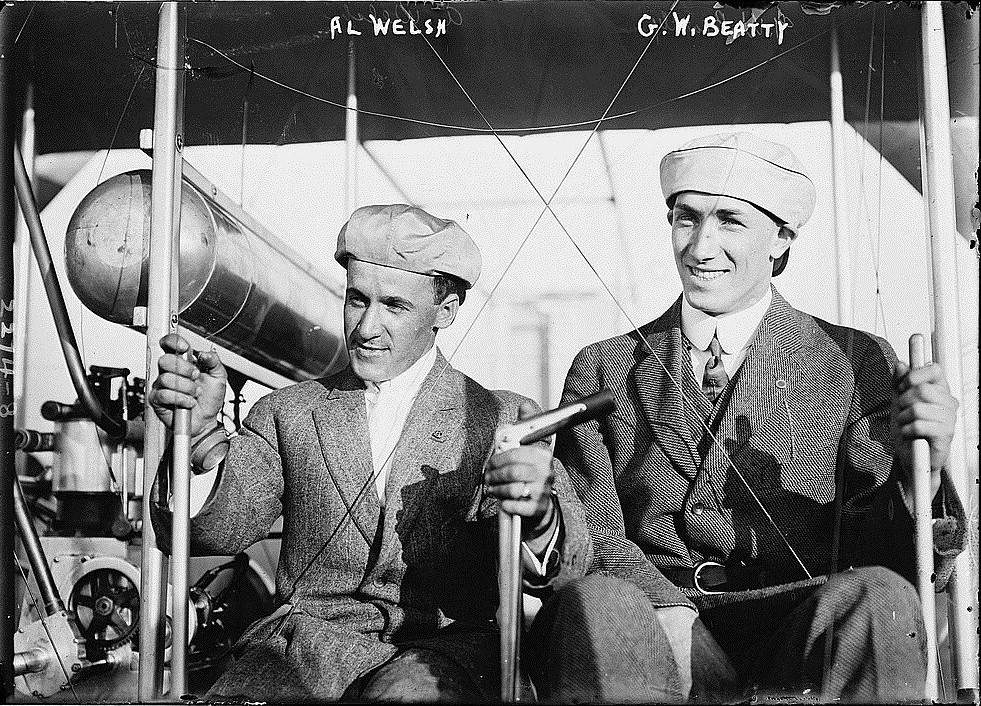
- Welsh (left) with George William Beatty, c. 1911
- Born: Laibel Welcher; August 14, 1881; Kiev, Russian Empire (now Ukraine)
- Died: June 11, 1912 (aged 30); United States Army Aviation School; College Park, Maryland, U.S.
- Cause of death: Aircrash
- Other name: Al Welsh
- Children: 1

Arthur L. "Al" Welsh (August 14, 1881 – June 11, 1912) was a Russian-born American pioneer aviator who became the first flight instructor for the Wright Brothers. He was killed in an aircrash in 1912.

== Early life ==
He was born as Laibel Welcher on August 14, 1881, in Kiev, Ukraine, which was then part of the Russian Empire. He was one of six children of Abraham and Dvora Welcher. In 1890, the family emigrated to Philadelphia, speaking no English. He attended both public school and Hebrew school there. His father died when he was 13 years old and he was sent to Washington, D.C., to live with relatives shortly after his mother remarried. He was a top student who did best in math and mechanics, and was excellent at swimming.

He changed his surname to "Welsh" when he joined the United States Navy as a 20-year-old, expecting greater success in the Navy with a name that did not sound "too Jewish". He received an honorable discharge after a tour of duty that lasted four years. He contracted typhoid fever one month after he was discharged and spent four months recovering in a hospital.

== Pilot ==
After his recuperation, Welsh moved back to Washington, D.C. While working as a bookkeeper at a local gas company, Welsh wrote a letter to the Wright brothers after seeing a flight demonstration in Virginia, but did not receive a job offer with the company. He traveled to Dayton, Ohio, convinced that he could make a positive impression in person. The brothers gave him a job in the Wright Company's new flying exhibition division, even though he did not have the experience they were looking for.

He began his orientation with the Wright Company in Dayton and traveled to the company's winter flying location in Montgomery, Alabama, where he showed strong potential as a pilot with Orville as his instructor. Called back to Dayton, he was asked to help establish the company's flight school at Huffman Prairie. He worked there as an instructor and test pilot alongside pioneers Frank Trenholm Coffyn and Ralph Johnstone. There he taught students including Hap Arnold, who would become a five-star general leading the United States Army Air Corps during World War II. He set multiple records for flight time and altitude and won several flying competitions.

Student George William Beatty flew his first solo flight on July 23, 1911, and that same day flew as a passenger with Welsh to establish a new American two-man altitude record of 1,860 feet, one of Welsh's many such records.

== Death ==
Welsh died in a crash on June 11, 1912, while flying with Leighton Wilson Hazelhurst, Jr. at the United States Army Aviation School in College Park, Maryland, on a Wright Model C that had recently been purchased by the Aeronautical Division, U.S. Signal Corps. The United States Army Signal Corps had established a series of ten acceptance tests for the aircraft, and Welsh and Hazelhurst were taking the Model C on a climbing test, the next to last in the series required by the Army. Shortly after takeoff, the plane pitched over while making a turn and fell 30 feet (9.1 m) to the ground, killing both crew members. They had both been ejected from their seats, with Welsh suffering a crushed skull and Hazelhurst a broken neck. The New York Times described Welsh as "one of the most daring professional aviators in America" and his flying partner Hazelhurst as being among the "most promising of the younger aviators of the army".

A board of inquiry was formed by the United States Secretary of War Henry Lewis Stimson, which concluded that Welsh was at fault in the crash, having risen to 150 feet, with the plan to dive at a 45-degree angle in order to gain momentum for a climb, but had made the dive too soon, with the board's results reported in the June 29, 1912, issue of Scientific American. In a 2003 interview, a cousin of Welsh's reported the family's belief that the tests were run too rapidly and that Welsh was doomed to fail by carrying too much fuel and a passenger, giving a craft that would be unable to make the planned maneuver with the weight it was carrying.

Former student George William Beatty, who had set up his own flying instruction school on Long Island, replaced Welsh as the government's test pilot at the College Park facility.

== Personal life ==
Welsh's funeral was held on June 13 at Adas Israel Congregation in Washington, D.C., then an Orthodox Jewish synagogue, with services led by the congregation's cantor Joseph Glushak. The funeral was attended by Orville Wright and his sister Katharine, who had traveled from Dayton, Ohio, and who were still in mourning for their brother Wilbur, who had died less than two weeks earlier. Welsh was buried at the Adas Israel Cemetery in the Douglass neighborhood of Washington, D.C.

Welsh was survived by his wife Annie, who died in 1926, and by their two-year-old daughter Ailene. His daughter lived into her 90s, living in England and adopting the name Abigail, but keeping the last name Welsh. In a 2003 interview she recalled the warmth and kindness of members of what she called the "Wright Circle", and how she had crawled through the legs of Hap Arnold as a toddler when he visited the family home. She expressed her regret that "I wish I had known my father. I heard so many good things about him."

In his 1949 book Global Mission, Hap Arnold credited Welsh with having "taught me all he knew, or rather, he had taught me all he could teach. He knew much more."

Welsh grew up in the same Washington D.C. neighborhood, Southwest, as another Russian immigrant, Asa Yoelson, later better known as the singer Al Jolson.

== See also ==
- List of aviators killed in aviation accidents or incidents before 1916
- List of accidents and incidents involving military aircraft (pre-1925)
