= Thomas Hazlehurst (chapel builder) =

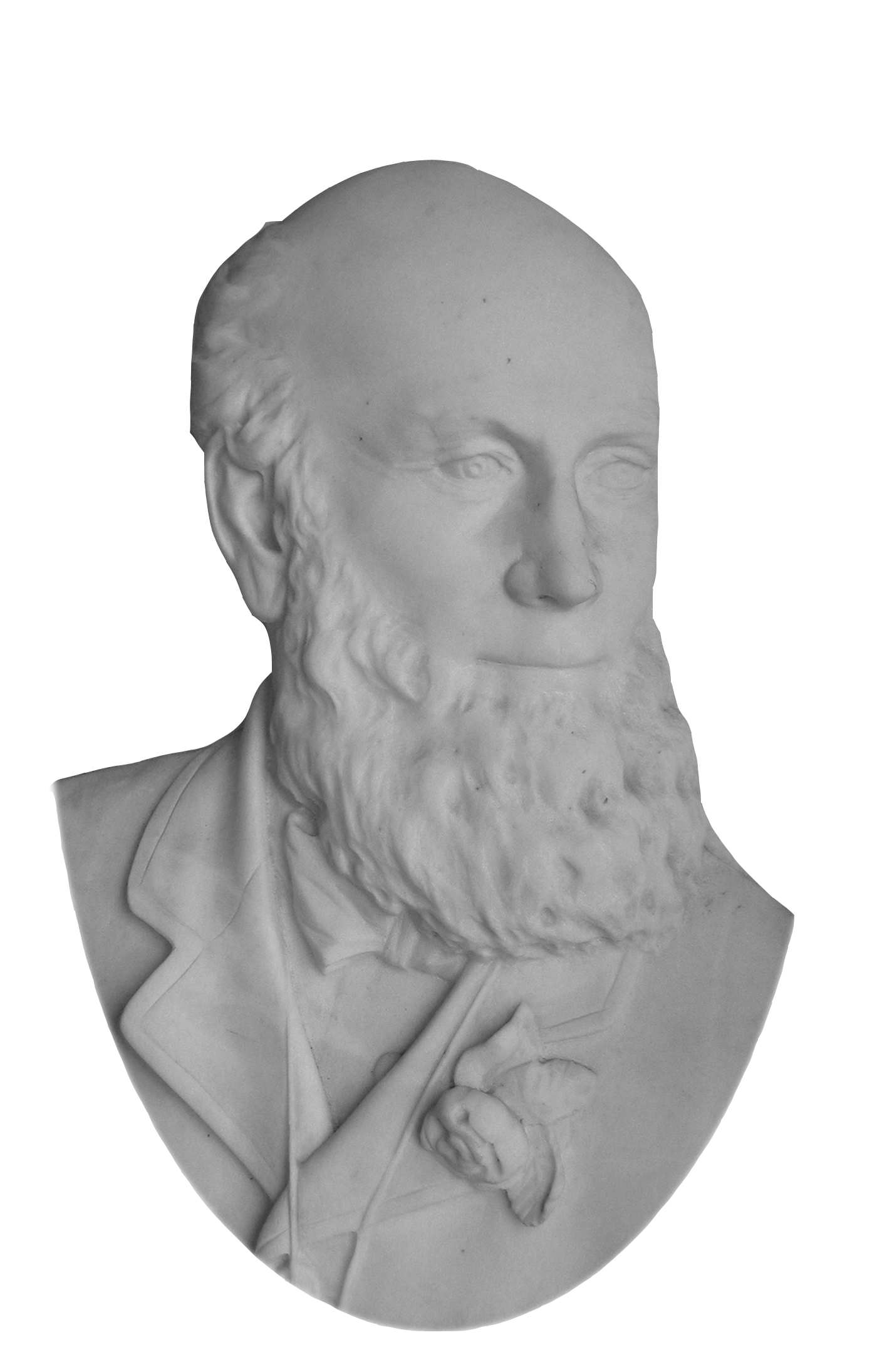
- Born: 17 April 1816; Runcorn, Cheshire, England
- Died: 14 July 1876 (aged 60); Runcorn, Cheshire, England
- Occupations: Chemical manufacturer, chapel builder
- Spouse(s): Eliza Howard, Ann Wall
- Children: Mary, Howard, Thomas Alfred, George Steward
- Parent(s): Thomas Hazlehurst, Mary Greenwood

Thomas Hazlehurst (17 April 1816 – 14 July 1876) was known nationally as "the Chapel Builder" and more locally as "the Prince of Methodism" or "the Prince of the Wesleyans". He was given these titles because of his generosity in paying wholly or largely for the building of some 12 chapels and three schools in the area of Runcorn, Widnes and the villages in north Cheshire. His father, also called Thomas, had founded a profitable soap and alkali manufacturing business, Hazlehurst & Sons, in Runcorn in 1816.

== Wealth ==
His wealth was derived from two sources. In 1851 Thomas' first wife Eliza died from tuberculosis on her 28th birthday leaving a fortune which was said to be of the order of £60,000. In addition he had a substantial income from the family business. Between the years 1859 to 1875, when the partners in the business were the two youngest brothers Thomas and Charles, each took home around £6,000 each year. During that time the business was run mainly by Charles, leaving Thomas to concentrate on religious matters.

== Religion ==
Like his father, Thomas was a pious Methodist. He held all the positions available to a layman in the church and was at one time the organist at Brunswick chapel. He chaired many committees for religious and charitable groups. During his life he wrote and distributed free a large number of sermons or "discourses". But he is best known for his generous donations to the Wesleyan Methodist movement, in particular his paying for the building of chapels and schools. In addition he was frequently invited to lay the foundation stones for chapels and schools both locally and further afield. On each occasion he was presented with a silver inscribed commemorative trowel or mallet. In all he collected almost 100 of these tokens and displayed them with pride, mounted in a large wooden frame in the lounge of his home.

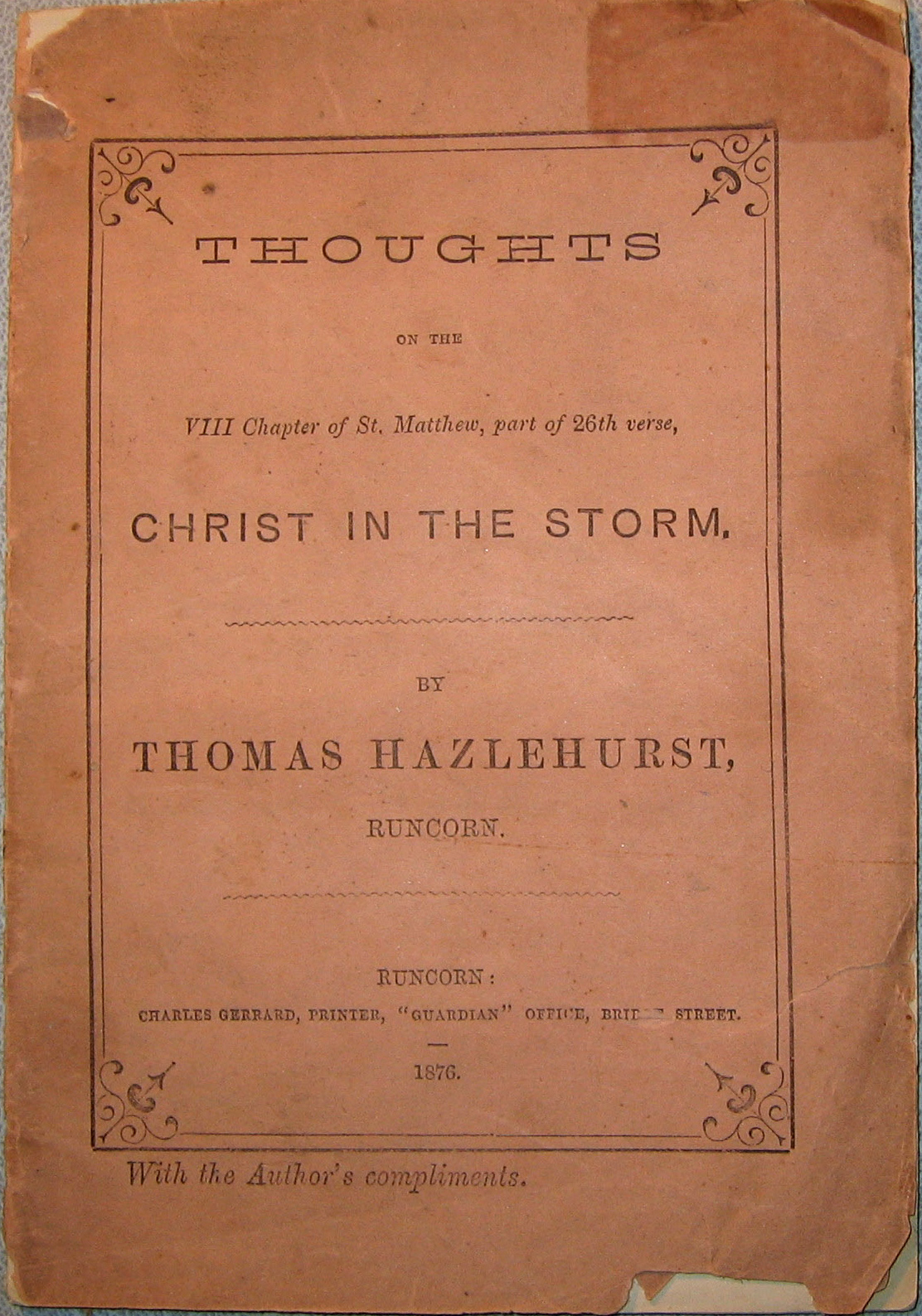
Sermon by Thomas Hazlehurst

== Chapel building ==
Thomas' first known gift of a complete chapel was in 1848 in Farnworth, then a village north of what is now the town of Widnes. At that time the ancient Anglican parish church of Runcorn was being demolished and rebuilt. Thomas bought the pulpit from that church and donated it to the chapel at Farnworth. Some years later he donated an organ to Brunswick chapel. In 1857 he paid the greater part of the cost of a new chapel in the Appleton area of Widnes.

Then came the following for which he paid the complete cost, unless otherwise stated (the stated costs are approximate):

- 1858 Eden chapel at Five Crosses, a hamlet to the east of Frodsham.
- 1860 Hough Green (Ditton) chapel, Widnes costing £850.
- 1861 Halebank chapel, Widnes costing £900.
- 1862 Camden chapel and school, Runcorn. It is not recorded that he paid the full cost for them but he certainly made a large donation towards them.
- 1864 Victoria Road chapel, Widnes. The largest chapel yet, costing £3,350
- 1864 Widnes Dock chapel, towards which Thomas donated nearly £3,000,
- 1866 St Paul's chapel, Runcorn. This was built on land donated by Thomas and his brother Charles on land adjacent to their factory in High Street, Runcorn. It cost £8,000 and was considered to be the finest Wesleyan chapel in the Liverpool district.
- 1870 Camden school was enlarged, the cost being met by a donation from Thomas and public subscriptions.
- 1871 Halton Road chapel, Runcorn. Another fine chapel costing about £8,000.

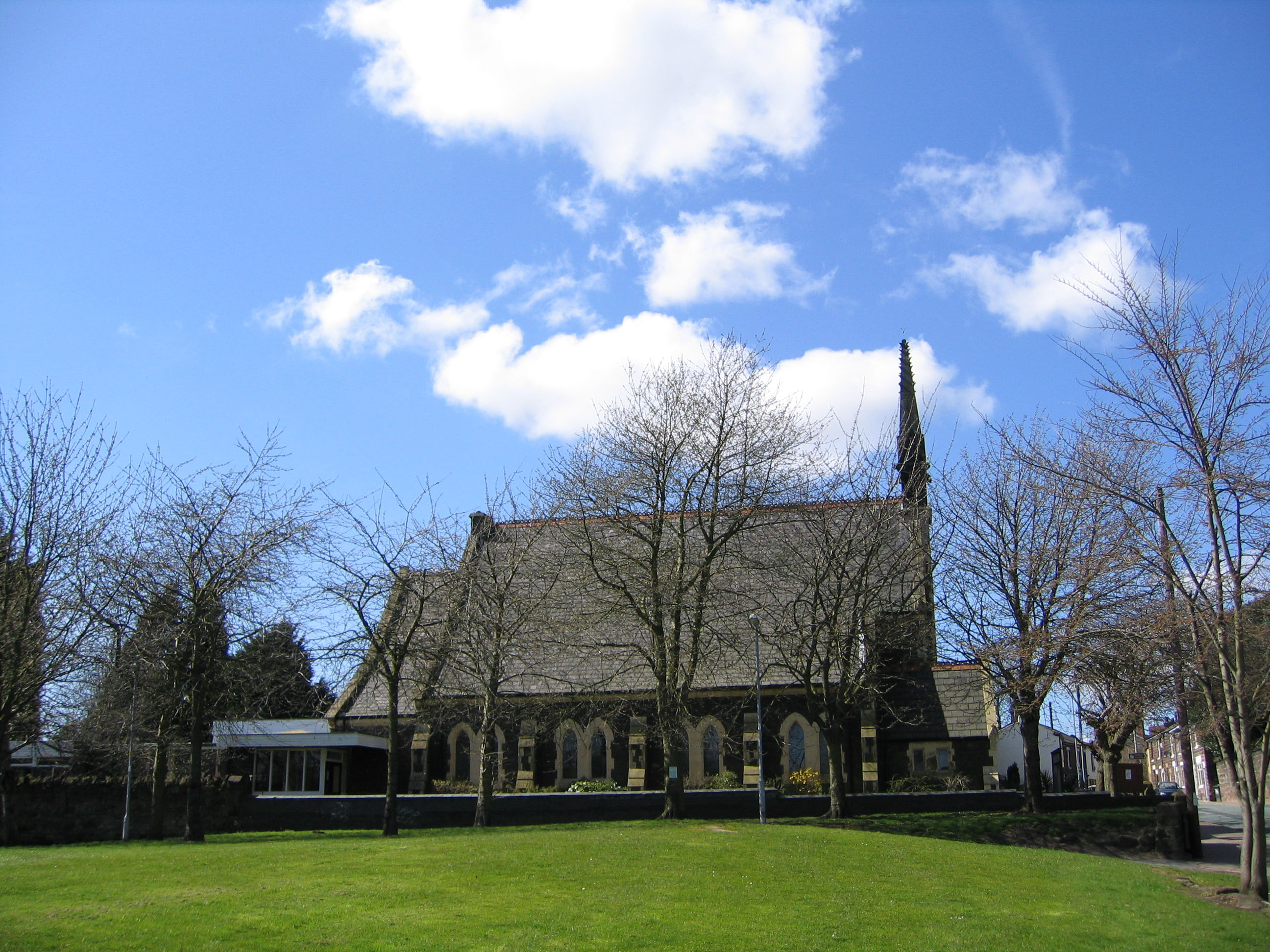
Trinity Chapel, Halton

- 1871 Hurst chapel, Kingsley (a village east of Frodsham). Thomas paid over half the cost and also wrote off the outstanding debt on the old chapel.
- 1872 Weston Point chapel, Runcorn.
- 1873 Trinity chapel, Frodsham. Another fine chapel with a spire. The chapel cost £7,000.
- 1873 Weston day school, Runcorn.
- 1875 Trinity chapel and day school, Halton. This is the only one of Hazlehurst's chapels which is still in use as a chapel today.

In all, his donations to the Wesleyan movement are estimated to have totalled some £70,000. He is buried next to two of his brothers in Runcorn cemetery.

== Architects' drawings ==
These are reproductions of art work by architects for four of Thomas Hazlehurst's chapels.

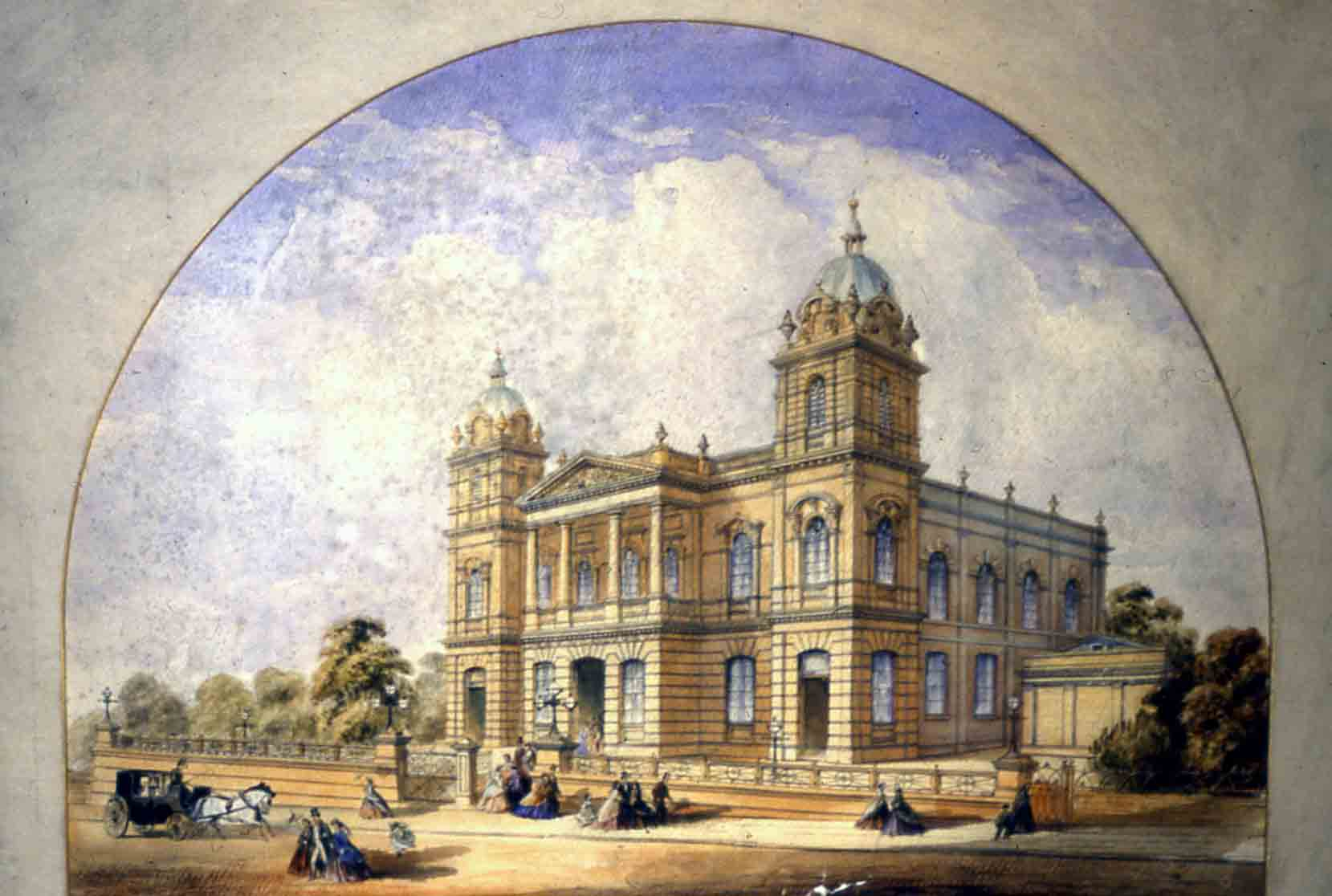
St Paul's chapel

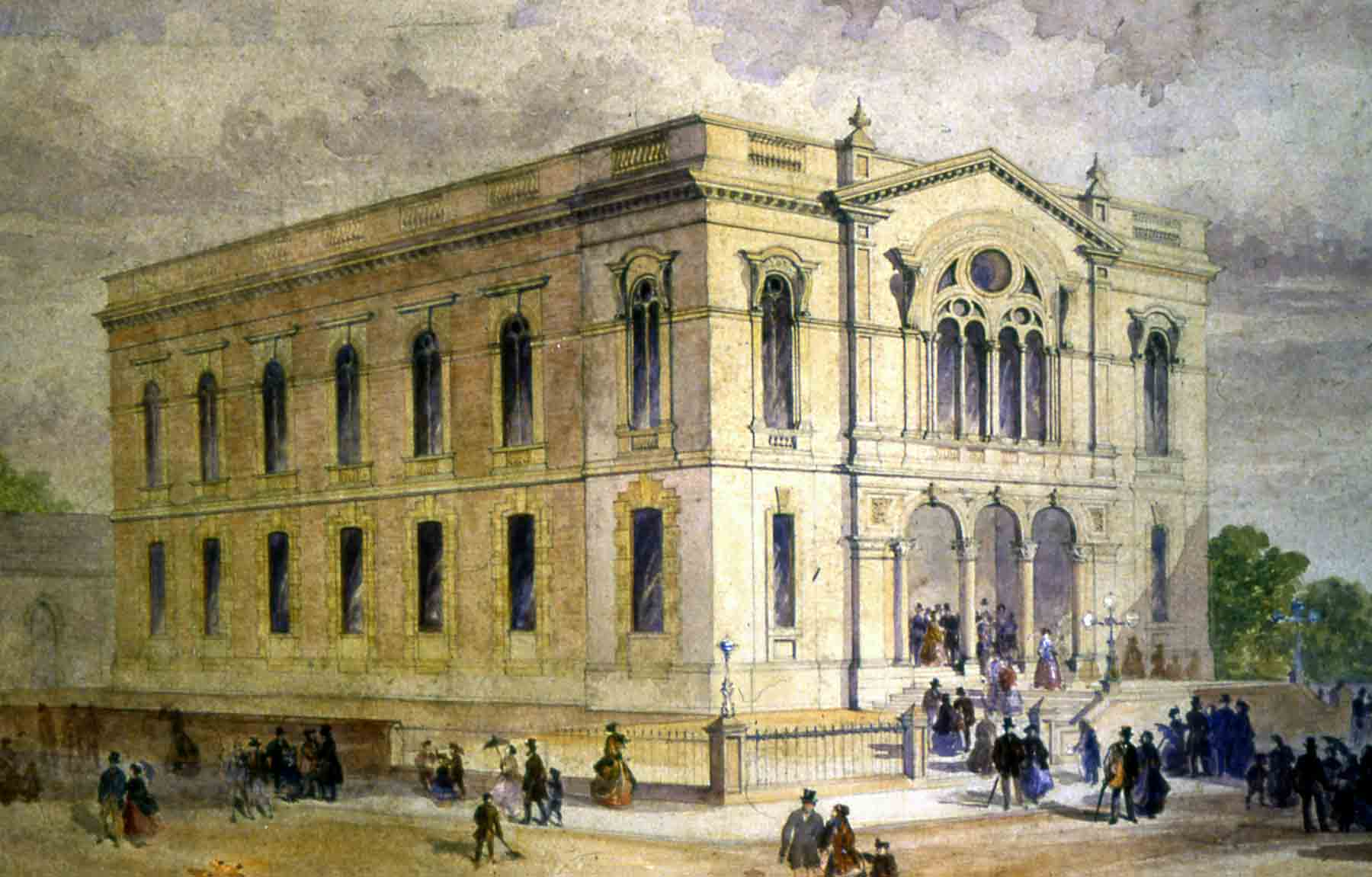
Halton Road chapel

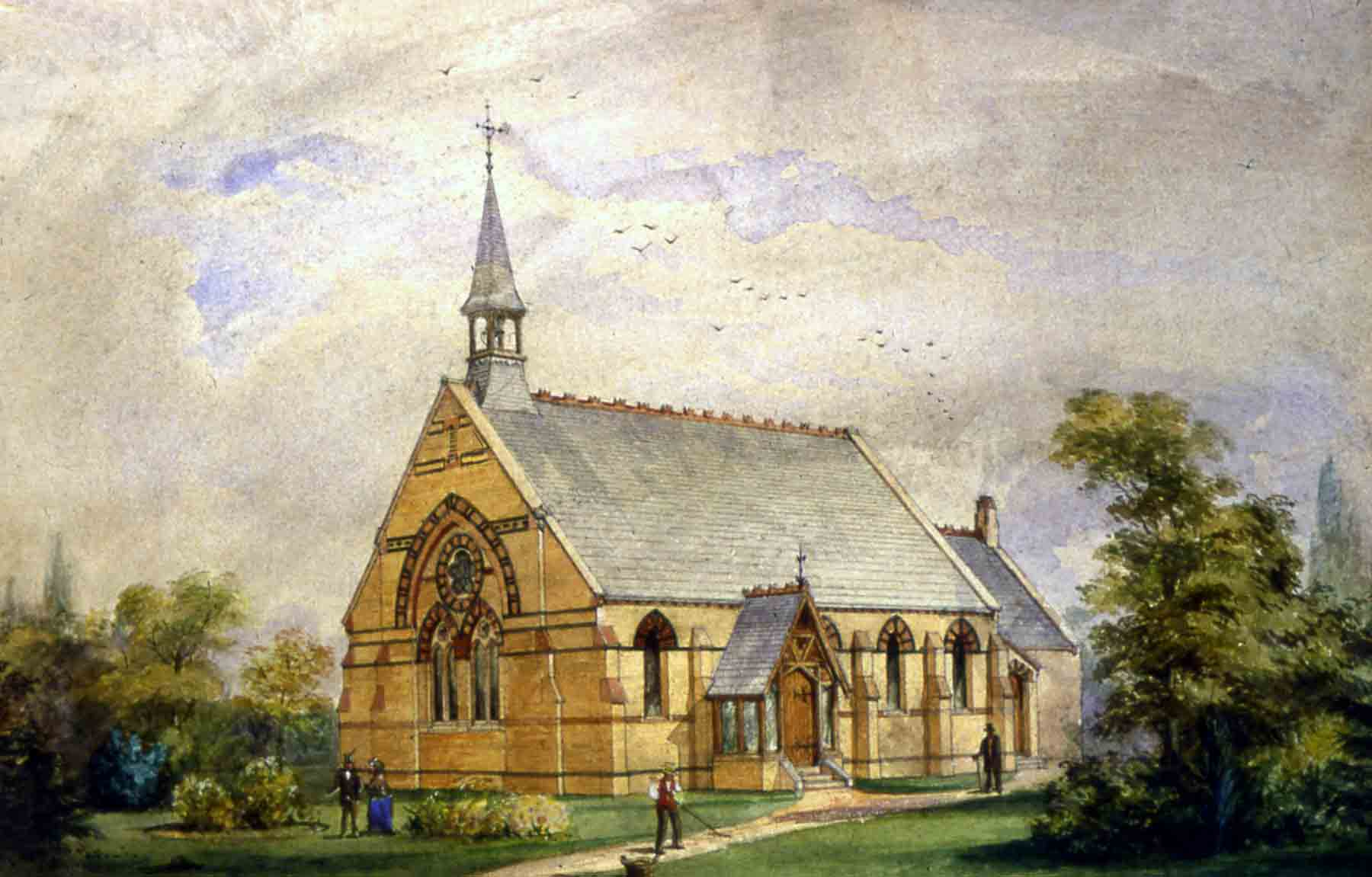
Weston Point chapel
