= Thomas Hazlehurst (artist) =

English painter

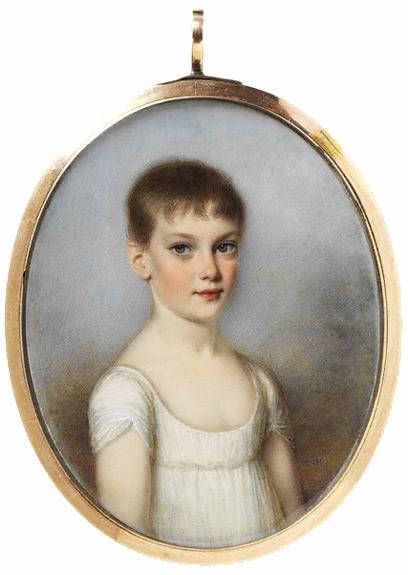
Thomas Hazlehurst, Portrait of an Unknown Boy, c. 1800, watercolour on ivory, V&A Museum no. Evans 133 Victoria and Albert Museum, London

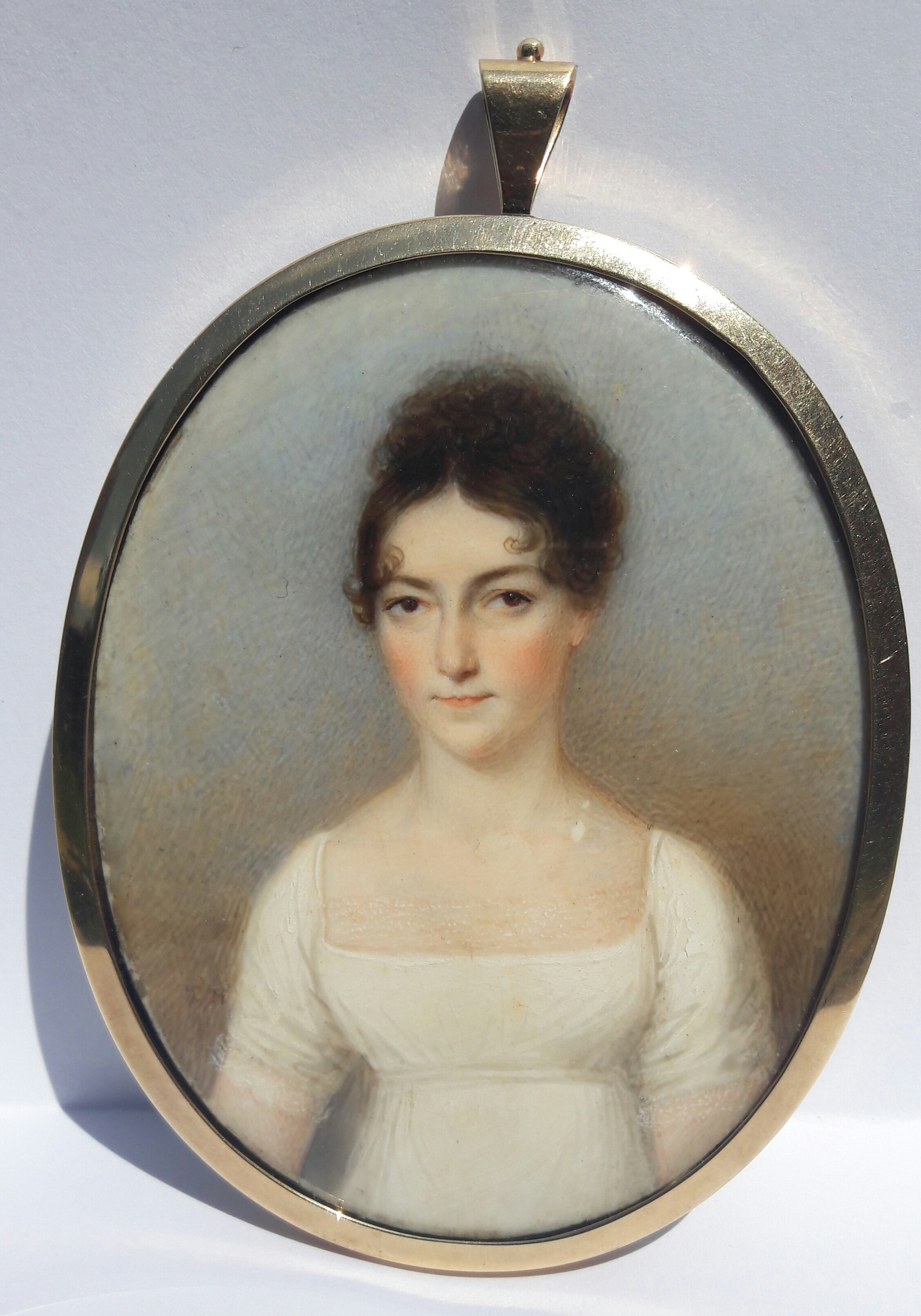
Portrait miniature of lady by T. Hazlehurst, c. 1800

Thomas Hazlehurst (ca. 1740 – ca. 1821) was an English miniature painter.

He was born in Liverpool and was a pupil of Joshua Reynolds. He exhibited at the Society for Promoting Painting and Design in Liverpool between 1760 and 1818 and at the Liverpool Academy between 1810 and 1812. He made over £20,000 from his paintings but invested badly and died in poverty.

His work is highly finished and is said to be of "great excellence". Some of his work is in the British Museum and a collection of his paintings of Lancashire flora is in the City of Liverpool Library.

== Personal life ==
Hazlehurst married Martha Bentley at Rostherne, Cheshire by licence on 24 February 1783. The marriage licence describes Thomas as a "portrait painter", aged 19, a bachelor, of More, Rostherne, Cheshire, son of John Hazlehurst. It seems likely, therefore, that he was the Thomas Hazlehurst, son of John and Sarah Hazlehurst, baptized at Lymm, Cheshire on 20 Nov 1763.

Hazlehurst died in Liverpool in 1821 and was buried at St. James, Toxteth on 19 June 1821 (age given in the burial register as 59).
