= Thomas Hazlehurst (businessman) =

- Born: 27 February 1779; Winwick, Lancashire, England
- Died: 18 February 1842 (aged 62); Runcorn, Cheshire, England
- Occupations: Soap and alkali manufacturer
- Spouse: Mary Greenwood
- Children: William, John, Eliza, Sarah, Mary, Thomas, Charles

Thomas Hazlehurst (27 February 1779 – 18 February 1842) was an English businessman who founded the soap and alkali manufacturing company of Hazlehurst & Sons in Runcorn, Cheshire. He was also a devoted Methodist and he played a large part in the civic matters of the town.

== Life and career ==
He was born in Winwick, Lancashire, but his family soon moved to Cheshire and eventually settled in Runcorn. Thomas was involved in various business enterprises before establishing a soapery (soap manufacturing factory) on the north bank of the Bridgewater Canal on land between the canal and High Street in 1816. Originally the alkali necessary for making soap would have been obtained from vegetable sources, probably kelp. However, by 1830 he was making his own alkali by the Leblanc process. His venture became very successful and in 1832 his business was in the top 20 soap manufacturing factories in Great Britain. In order to disperse the pollution resulting from the Leblanc process he built an enormous chimney over 300 feet (91 m) in height which was one of the highest chimneys in the country at that time. Thomas had four sons, William, John, Thomas junior and Charles, who all took part in running the business which came to be called Hazlehurst & Sons.

In 1806 Thomas had a daughter, Eliza, who died in infancy. As a result of this Thomas was converted to Methodism and he played a great part in the development of the denomination in the town. At the beginning of the 19th century there were very few Methodists in the town but by 1827 the movement was sufficiently prosperous to be able to build a substantial two-storey chapel and schoolroom, Brunswick chapel. Thomas was extremely pious, praying in the morning, at noon and in the evening and not allowing this to be interrupted by his business or by visitors.

He was also active in civic affairs being at one time or another member of the select vestry, the Committee on Bridewell, Offices and Petty Sessions, the Board of Health, a Director of Runcorn Gas Company and an Inspector of the Lighting and Watching Act.

After his death the business was continued by his sons. He was buried in the churchyard of All Saints, Runcorn.
