= Tanforan Racetrack =

Horse racing facility in California, US

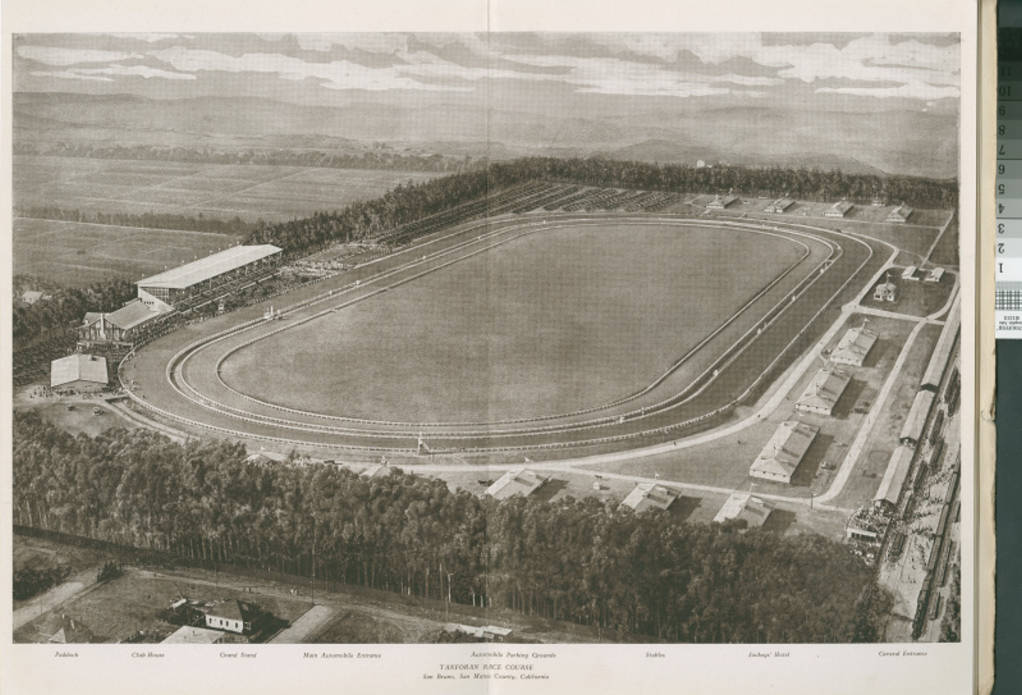
- Tanforan Racetrack
- Interactive map of Tanforan Racetrack
- Location: San Bruno, California, United States
- Coordinates: 37°38′08″N 122°25′09″W
- Date opened: November 4, 1899
- Date closed: July 31, 1964; 61 years ago (fire)
- Course type: Flat for Thoroughbreds
- Notable races: Tanforan Handicap

Tanforan Racetrack, also known as Tanforan Park, was a thoroughbred horse racing facility in San Bruno on the San Francisco Peninsula in California. It operated from November 4, 1899, to 1964. The horse racing track and buildings were constructed to serve a clientele from nearby San Francisco.

Between April and October 1942, the racetrack was the site of the Tanforan Assembly Center, an internment camp in which 8,000 Bay Area Japanese Americans were detained and processed for forced relocation and internment.

The racetrack was destroyed by fire on July 31, 1964. The site is now the location of The Shops at Tanforan shopping center. The mall has a Tanforan Racetrack historical plaque, the Tanforan Assembly Center commemorative garden and a statue of Seabiscuit.

== History ==
=== Racing and feuding ===
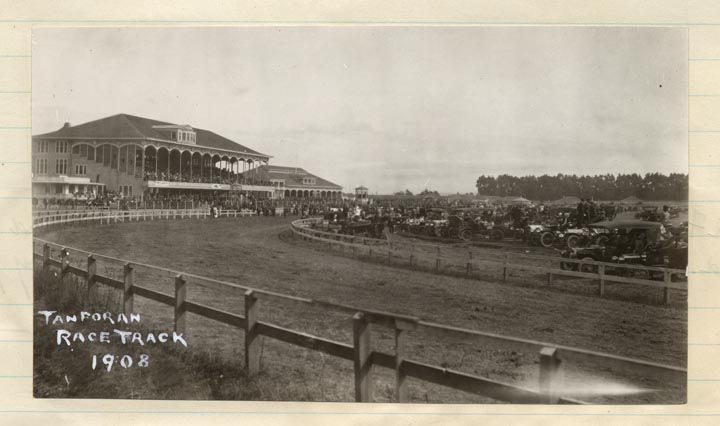
Tanforan Park track and grandstand (1908)

The site, 12 mi (19 km) from San Francisco, was chosen to circumvent a ban on gambling that had been implemented on March 13, 1899, which closed down the Ingleside track in the southwestern corner of the city. The San Francisco Board of Supervisors (SFBoS) attempted to re-legalize gambling as betting with pool selling in July, but the measure was vetoed by Mayor James D. Phelan. Edward C. Corrigan, who operated Ingleside, lost a $250,000 investment he had made in the track, spurring him to start a new track outside San Francisco. Corrigan organized a team of investors, the Western Turf Association, for this purpose; the principal shareholders were banker William H. Crocker and his brother-in-law Prince Andre Poniatowski, a self-styled nobleman who wintered in San Francisco. The Western Turf Association acquired 150 acres (61 ha) of land in San Bruno and began construction of the grandstand by September 1899, which was estimated to cost US$35,000 (equivalent to $1,350,000 in 2025) and scheduled to open in time for the season in November. The facility was named after Toribio Tanforan, the grandson-in-law of Jose Antonio Sanchez, the grantee of the Rancho Buri Buri Mexican land grant. Approximately 700 men labored to complete the new track, and by late September, paving work had begun for the road servicing Tanforan Park, requiring 150 cu yd/d (110 m^{3}/d) of gravel.

The race track, then named Tanfaran Park, opened for racing on November 4, 1899. The 1 mi (1.6 km) oval track was oriented with its major axis lying along an imaginary line between the Golden Gate and Mount Hamilton. The grandstand had seats for 3000 with a total capacity for 5000 spectators; service was provided by Southern Pacific on the Peninsula Commute via a stop in front of the grandstand, just 30 minutes from the Third and Townsend Depot. Before races started, the neighboring Bay Area tracks agreed to have half the regular season raced at the California Jockey Club in Oakland (that racetrack opened as the Oakland Trotting Park in 1871 at the Emeryville Shellmound in what is now Emeryville), and to split the remaining half between Ingleside in San Francisco and the new Tanfaran Park track in San Bruno. The track's name quickly was corrupted to Tanforan Park within that first winter season, which lasted just two weeks, holding six races per weekday, from 1:30 PM to 4 PM. In addition, six stakes races were scheduled to be run.

The first season was marred a feud between Corrigan, the owner of Ingleside and de facto leader of Tanforan, and Thomas H. Williams Jr., President of the California Jockey Club, which had been founded by his father, Thomas H. Williams Sr. Corrigan's initial bitterness stemmed from the closure of Ingleside in 1899, as he felt that Williams Jr. had influenced the decision to shut down gambling in San Francisco and in so doing, secure a monopoly on horse racing in the Bay Area for Oakland. The dispute was exacerbated when Corrigan's entries were refused by the Oakland track; as he had been repudiated by reputable horsemen nationwide, the California Jockey Club wanted nothing to do with him. Corrigan took revenge "by making Tanforan a haven for men whose methods have made them objectionable at Oakland", which violated the rules of the American Turf Congress. This included Corrigan scheduling a race at Tanforan Park with a US$10,000 (equivalent to $390,000 in 2025) purse the same day as the Burns Handicap at Oakland, which carried an identical purse, thinning the field at Oakland. The ostensible leaders of the Western Turf Association made a public apology in January 1900 after Corrigan publicly denounced R.B. Milroy, the secretary of Cal Jockey and author of the San Francisco Call article describing Corrigan's malfeasance. Compounding matters, the finances of the Western Turf Association were called into question during a trial that March. By August of that year, Corrigan was out after Poniatowski, president of the San Francisco Jockey Club, acquired a controlling interest in both the Ingleside and Tanforan Park tracks.

Second season stakes races at Tanforan Park included the Winter Handicap, with a purse of US$3,000 (equivalent to $120,000 in 2025) on January 26, 1901; Eclipse, US$1,500 (equivalent to $60,000 in 2025) on February 2; California Oaks, US$2,500 (equivalent to $100,000 in 2025) on February 9; California Derby, US$3,000 (equivalent to $120,000 in 2025) on March 2; Spring Handicap, US$3,000 (equivalent to $120,000 in 2025) on March 30; and Great Trial Stakes, US$2,500 (equivalent to $100,000 in 2025) on April 27. The feud between Tanforan and Cal Jockey was not resolved by pushing out Corrigan, however; in February 1901, a "declaration of war" was made when Poniatowski stated that racing would continue at Tanforan indefinitely to draw competitors and bettors away from Oakland, as he felt that Williams Jr. had improperly influenced San Mateo County to shorten Tanforan's season. Williams in turn saw the prolonged session as a violation of the 1899 agreement to split the racing season between the three tracks and vowed to keep the California Jockey Club operating as well.

The SFBoS again passed a measure permitting pool selling in early March 1901, bringing hopes the Ingleside track could be reopened, but the measure was vetoed by Mayor Phelan, renewing the ban on gambling in San Francisco. Williams settled the dispute a few days later by purchasing both Ingleside and Tanforan Park from the San Francisco Jockey Club for US$600,000 (equivalent to $23,220,000 in 2025); Poniatowski admitted that Phelan's veto influenced his decision to sell. Bay Area racing was consolidated under the New California Jockey Club, incorporating members from the Western Turf Association, Pacific Coast Jockey Club, and San Francisco Jockey Club, and the last race of the season at Tanforan Park was held on April 19. Although horse racing continued at Tanforan intermittently that fall, in January 1902 Williams announced that no more horses would be raced at both Ingleside and Tanforan Park. However, the track continued to operate, as some horses were kept at Tanforan to prepare for races at Oakland and Ingleside. Williams met with sugar magnate Adolph B. Spreckels in April 1903 and agreed to lease Tanforan to Spreckels for automobile racing. As a result of the feuds and leases, Tanforan Park saw a variety of uses during its early years, including dog shows, motorcycle races, and auto races.

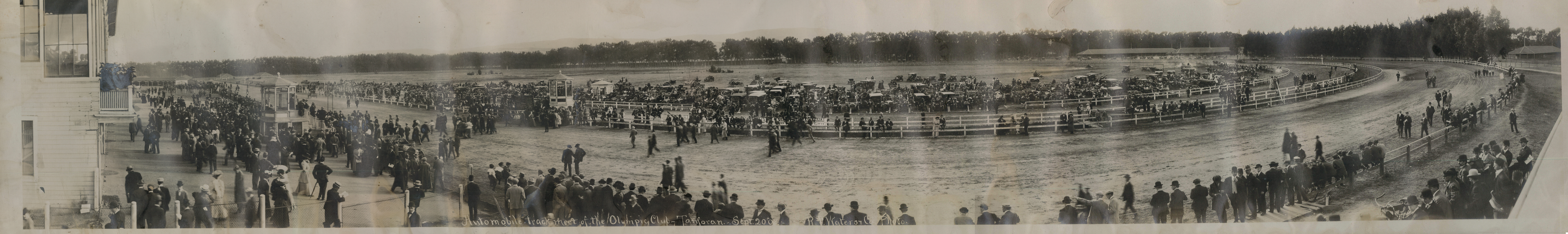
Panoramic photograph of the Second Annual Olympic Club Automobile Track Meet at Tanforan Park (Sep 20, 1908)

By 1908, Williams stated the track at Tanforan Park would be extended and horse racing might resume after the Bayshore Cutoff had improved rail passenger service to the site; however, the Ingleside track, which had been used to house people displaced by the 1906 San Francisco earthquake, was unlikely to reopen. Horse racing resumed that fall, with the final race of the 1908 season held on November 1.

=== Air Meets and World War I ===
Louis Paulhan at Tanforan (Jan 1910)

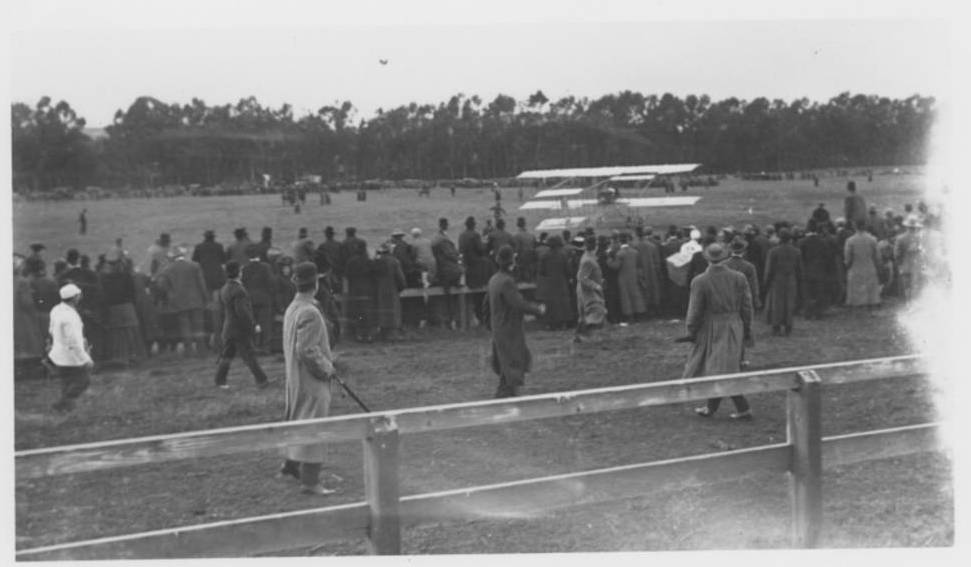
First flight in northern California

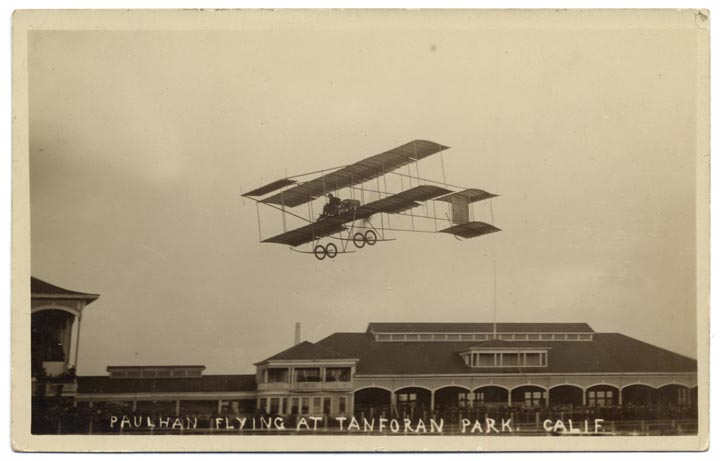
Flying past the grandstand

In January 1910, Tanforan Park served as the site for the San Francisco International Air Meet, which was the second aviation event in the United States, following the inaugural event held in Los Angeles the week before. The Air Meet was organized by the Pacific Aero Club and attended by aviation notables Louis Paulhan and John J. Montgomery. Attempts to take off were scrubbed on January 23 due to stormy conditions. Paulhan first took flight on January 24, covering 12 mi (19 km) in 12 minutes after the storm that had thwarted his takeoff attempts earlier had passed; it was the first recorded flight in northern California. The next day, he flew for 10 mi (16 km) at an altitude of between 200 and 500 ft (61 and 152 m), witnessed by 30,000 spectators, the largest crowd to ever visit Tanforan Park; finally, to close the exhibition, Paulhan took off from Tanforan Park at 3:55 PM on January 26 and flew to Redwood City and back in 31 minutes, 30 seconds, a distance of 30 mi (48 km) at an altitude ranging from 400 to 1,300 ft (120 to 400 m). Paulhan's flights were taken in his Farman III biplane. After watching Paulhan flying at Tanforan in 1910, Ivan Gates was inspired to begin his career of exhibition flying.

Approximately one year later, the San Francisco International Air Meet opened on January 7, 1911, with American aviators Glenn Curtiss, Eugene Burton Ely, and Charles F. Willard scheduled to fly alongside Hubert Latham (France) and James Radley (England). This time, a new airfield on the opposite side of the interurban tracks from Tanforan Park was used, named Selfridge Field (not to be confused with the later air base in Michigan) to honor Lt. Thomas Selfridge. The military was an eager participant in 1911, having taken the responsibility to prepare Selfridge Field and staging several exhibitions at the Air Meet, including military maneuvers and early applications of airplanes to war, with Latham and Willard shooting stationary targets, then Willard dropping practice bombs within a 45 ft (14 m) circle from an altitude of 200 ft (61 m).

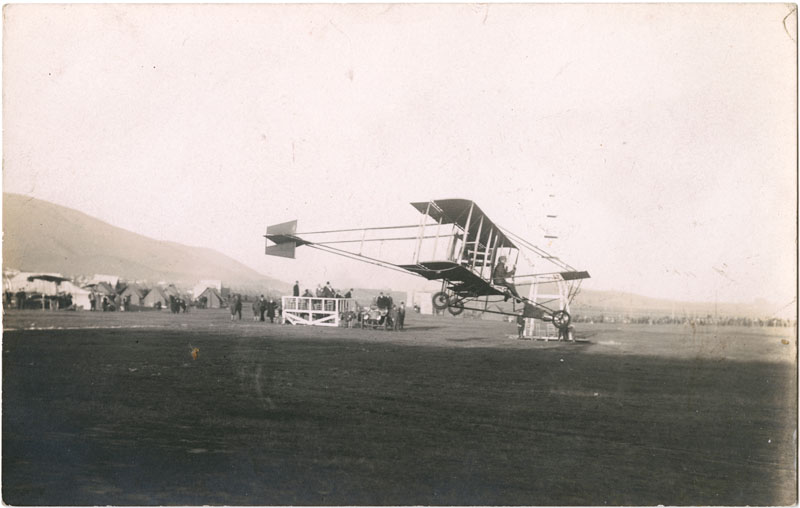
Curtiss Model D landing at Selfridge Field c. 1911

The 1911 Air Meet would include multiple aviation firsts. On January 15 Phil Parmalee piloted a Wright Model B biplane carrying Lt. Myron S. Crissy, who dropped a live bomb within 10 ft (3.0 m) of its target from an altitude of 500 ft (150 m) as the first instance of aerial bombing in the United States. The first aerial reconnaissance flight was held the next day, as Lt. George E.M. Kelly and Walter Brookins flew at an altitude of 2,000 ft (610 m), unsuccessfully trying to locate ground troops that had taken shelter in wooded areas nearby. On January 18, Ely took off from Tanforan in his Curtiss Model D airplane and landed on the USS Pennsylvania, an armored cruiser temporarily fitted with a short flight deck and anchored in San Francisco Bay. This was the first ever successful shipboard landing of an aircraft, and the first to use the tailhook system, leading to today's aircraft carrier technology. Later that same day, Ely took off from the Pennsylvania (now pointed into the wind) and landed back at Tanforan. Finally, on January 21, Lt. Paul W. Beck was the passenger and radio operator for the first air-to-ground wireless transmission on a flight piloted by Parmalee; the transmitter was designed and built by Beck and the signal was received from a distance of 40 mi (64 km).

A third air meet at Tanforan Park started on December 25, 1912, with flying exhibitions to feature local pilots Lincoln Beachey and Tom Gunn; in addition to close passes and other aerial acrobatics, Beachey raced in his airplane against an automobile (driven by "Daredevil" Edwards) and motorcycle. Beachey also was scheduled to present a game of "aerial leapfrog" with his friend and fellow stunt pilot Horace Kearny, but Kearny was killed ten days before the event opened in an apparent crash while flying in a "hydro-aeroplane" with reporter Chester Lawrence from Newport Beach; Roy Francis performed the stunt with Beachey instead.

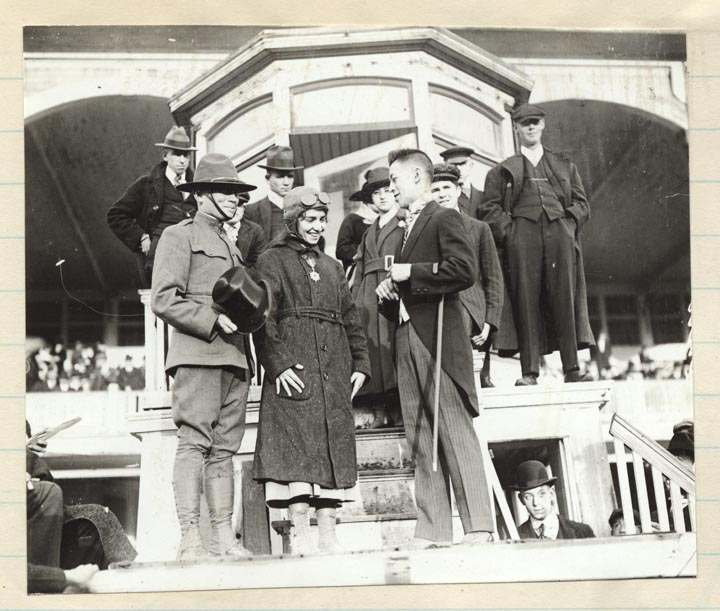
Tom Gunn presents Katherine Stinson with a medal from China at Tanforan Park (1917)

Tanforan was temporarily converted into a United States military training center in summer 1917 during World War I. Camp Tanforan was used by the "Grizzlies", a volunteer regiment organized as the 144th Field Artillery of the United States Army. The Grizzlies held their first muster at Tanforan on August 31, 1917 and departed for Camp Linda Vista (later renamed to Camp Kearny), near San Diego, for further preparation on October 25. To help raise funds for the Grizzlies, aviator Katherine Stinson flew to the track in December 1917 for aerial exhibitions, setting a nonstop solo aerial distance record of 610 mi (980 km) from San Diego in the process. At Tanforan, Gunn presented Stinson with a medal from China in recognition of her Asian tour over the winter of 1916–17. The 1500 soldiers of the Grizzlies arrived safely overseas in August 1918 and began returning from the war in January 1919.

=== Gambling bans and interwar revival ===
Meanwhile, the ban on "pool selling" had been extended statewide on January 31, 1911, effectively ending horse racing at Tanforan Park. The grandstand and stables were dismantled in December 1918 after "rapidly [degenerating] into a home for hobos and spiders" between the 1911 ban and the site's 1917 reactivation as Camp Tanforan, followed by foreclosure proceedings in 1918 against Cal Jockey which forced the property's sale.

The track was rebuilt in 1922 and reopened without betting for the 1923 and 1924 seasons through the subsidy of the Pacific Coast Jockey Club, a group of prominent area businessmen led by Adolph B. Spreckels, who was Club president and had previously leased the track for auto racing in 1903. The club announced its intentions to reopen Tanforan as a "clean sport" without betting shortly after incorporating in January 1922. Work on the steel grandstand, which had a seated capacity of 5000 spectators and an estimated cost of US$100,000 (equivalent to $1,920,000 in 2025), started in December 1922. The new owners were John W. Marchbank and William P. Kyne. Rudolph Spreckels, vice president of the Pacific Coast Jockey Club, confidently declared that no betting was allowed at Tanforan. Other officials of Pacific Coast Jockey Club included Herbert Fleishhacker and John D. Stelling. Before the start of racing, the rebuilt Tanforan track was the site of a barbecue in September 1923 celebrating the Pony Express, marked by horse relays from Stockton to Tanforan via San Jose and San Francisco, following the original route. A rodeo was held at the same time, featuring an appearance by Douglas Fairbanks and Mary Pickford on September 9.

The 1923 season was scheduled to run from November 3 to December 1, with six races each day except Sundays. There were nine scheduled stakes events that season. Horse racing was planned to be discontinued again after the 1924 spring season; the track had sustained a loss conservatively estimated at US$100,000 (equivalent to $1,880,000 in 2025), making it impossible to operate without legalized betting. As before, the track turned to auto racing and other events, including considering the installation of a boxing ring, although it was alleged that betting continued on at least one occasion. Intermittent operation continued in the 1920s, with bet-less racing held in 1926 and 1928. Marchbank, Kyne, and Judge Joseph A. Murphy introduced "option" betting after the 1928 season, allowing the track to resume more regular operation.

Stakes races continued at Tanforan, which introduced starting gates built by Bahr for the fall 1930 season starting November 15. The California Horse Racing Board was created in 1933 to regulate and license horse racing in California, including wagering on the results; the legislation which allowed parimutuel betting was championed by Kyne. Kyne had first pushed the bill in 1931, then after the Governor vetoed a version that passed in 1933, lobbied for its subsequent successful passage. In 1932, Kyne sold his interest in Tanforan Park and completed the Bay Meadows race track in 1934 in nearby San Mateo. That year, Tanforan was rebuilt again and a full racing season was held for the first time since 1924. In this third incarnation, Hollywood film director Frank Capra filmed scenes at Tanforan Park for two of his films, Broadway Bill (1934) and its remake, Riding High (1950). Prominent local banker William H. Crocker appeared in the background of a scene for Broadway Bill.

=== Tanforan Assembly Center ===
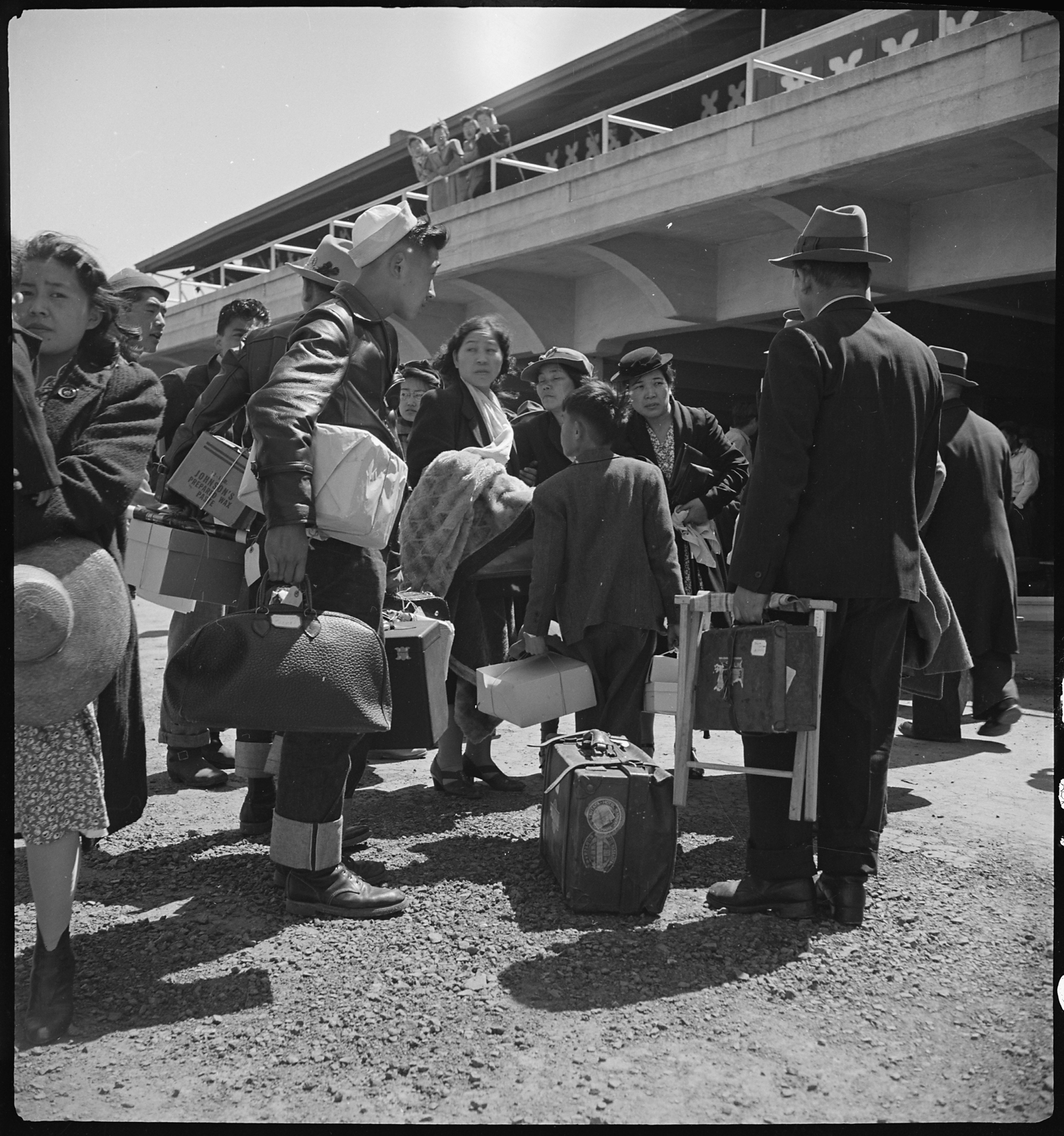
A family arrives at the Tanforan grandstand. Dorothea Lange, 1942.

Tanforan Park was acquired by the Wartime Civil Control Administration in April 1942 and from April to October 1942, used as the Tanforan Assembly Center, where 7,800 Japanese-Americans from the San Francisco Bay Area were held after the signing of Executive Order 9066. For comparison, the population of San Bruno was 6,519 in 1940.

The detainees were mostly U.S. citizens by birth, and were housed in temporary barracks, converted horse stalls, and the grandstand. Tanforan was one of several temporary Assembly Centers that were chosen "close to home" so that detainees could settle last-minute financial matters, minimize travel distances, and grow acclimated to group living while the permanent "War Relocation Centers" were being built. Conditions at Tanforan were difficult for the detainees, who struggled with sanitation, hunger, loss of freedom, and lack of privacy.

Starting in September, the first group of detainees were transferred from Tanforan to the Topaz War Relocation Center near Delta, Utah; daily trains carried the remaining detainees to Topaz over the next month. After October 13, the site was turned over the United States Army in October, then the Navy in June 1943, who kept the site for the duration of World War II. The site was collectively named a California Historical Landmark along with other Assembly Centers in 1980. Several memorial plaques have been placed on-site, and a Tanforan Assembly Center Memorial is scheduled to be completed outside the San Bruno BART station in spring 2022.

=== Resumption of racing and closure ===
Guy M. Standifer and Jack Ranier purchased the site in 1945 and in spring 1946, the site began a US$2,000,000 (equivalent to $33,020,000 in 2025) reconstruction as a race track, despite a nationwide shortage of building materials. The reconstruction permit was denied in May 1946 and a federal judge issued an injunction in 1947 to halt work at Tanforan, but the injunction was ignored and rebuilding the track continued; as a result, Standifer was arrested and jailed for three months alongside several other track officials, and after Eugene Mori took over the track in October 1947, associates of General Vaughan successfully lobbied the Justice Department to lift its injunction prohibiting construction. Racing at Tanforan resumed on March 14, 1947, despite the procurement controversy. At the time, the history as an Assembly Center was elided, and its wartime uses were noted to be merely "as a training and staging area" by the Navy.

At the time, the track was owned secretly by ex-bootlegger Joseph Reinfeld and a minor outrage ensued in 1949 after journalist Drew Pearson reported that aides to President Harry Truman, including General Harry H. Vaughan, had influenced government officials to facilitate the procurement of those materials. As the population of the San Francisco Peninsula and San Mateo County continued to grow after World War II, the track's previously pastoral setting became more urban. For example, the track was under the flight path for nearby San Francisco International Airport; jetliners passing overhead would occasionally startle racehorses unfamiliar with the site. A strike in 1957 idled the track, which subsequently was hit with a cheating scandal in 1958. The track was sold to an "Eastern syndicate" on August 26, 1959, for $5 million, then acquired two months later by a group of four investors led by William G. Gilmore.

Gilmore, the owner of Tanforan and Golden Gate Fields, died in 1962 and 67 acres (27 ha) of the neighboring Navy base was sold to a developer that year for US$1,200,000 (equivalent to $12,770,000 in 2025). The last race at Tanforan was held in 1963. In February 1964, the California Horse Racing Board approved the closure of Tanforan, shifting its race dates to nearby Golden Gate Fields in Albany and Bay Meadows (San Mateo); Tanforan Park was scheduled to be demolished. The 143-acre (58 ha) site was sold to the Sunset International Petroleum Corporation in March 1964 for US$6,150,000 (equivalent to $63,840,000 in 2025), who planned to build a residential development.

Before demolition could commence, a fire started at the grandstand on the afternoon of Friday, July 31, 1964 first reported at 4:55 P.M. (local) by San Francisco chief deputy sheriff Thomas J. Burns; while driving by, Burns had first seen a "flicker of flame" from a cardboard box, then heard an explosion and watched the flames engulf the building while on the telephone. Within minutes, the main wall collapsed; the speed at which the flames spread led San Bruno fire chief Herbert Freitas to suspect it was the product of arson: "This wouldn't happen — this couldn't happen — with normal combustible materials". Approximately 60 firemen responded from several neighboring cities, limiting the destruction to the grandstand and club house.

Eventually, the site was cleared and redeveloped as the Tanforan Park Shopping Center, which opened in 1971.

== Famous race competitors ==
Some of thoroughbred racing's most notable owners and trainers competed at Tanforan Racetrack including: owner/breeder James Ben Ali Haggin; owner/trainer Sam Hildreth; and trainer Noble Threewitt. Threewitt set a record when he won with nine consecutive starters at Tanforan in April 1954.

In 1932, the great Australian champion Phar Lap was brought to Tanforan to rest from his long ocean voyage and then conditioned before being shipped in late January to Agua Caliente Racetrack in Tijuana, Mexico, to run in the Agua Caliente Handicap.

Over the years, Tanforan Racecourse saw a number of famous horses compete on its track. Among them, future U.S. Racing Hall of Fame inductee Seabiscuit was stabled at Tanforan after recovering from an injury where he began training for a comeback.

In 1948, future U. S. Racing Hall of Fame inductee Citation set a new Tanforan track record of 2:02 4/5 for 1 1/4 mi (2.0 km) in winning the Tanforan Handicap. Two years later his Calumet Farm stablemate and Kentucky Derby winner, Ponder, also won the race.

In 1956, Bobby Brocato won his second straight Tanforan Handicap. That same year, he equaled the Tanforan track record for 8.5 furlongs (5,600 ft; 1,700 m) and set a new track record for 9 furlongs (5,900 ft; 1,800 m).
