= Valhalla Memorial Park Cemetery =

Cemetery in Los Angeles, California

Coordinates: 34°11′25″N 118°21′13″W

Valhalla Memorial Park Cemetery and Mortuary
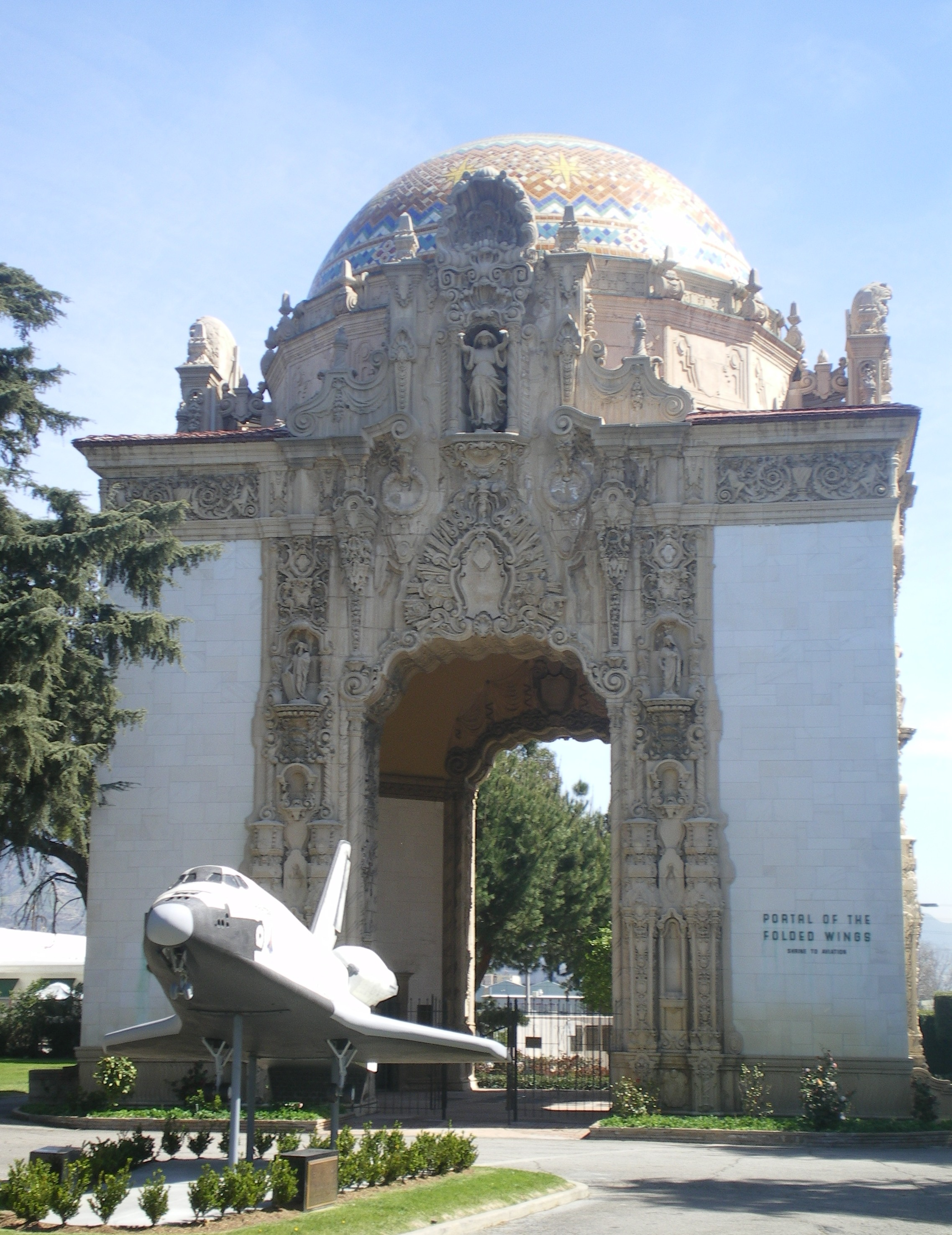
- Portal of the Folded Wings Shrine to Aviation, the former entrance to the cemetery
- Interactive map of Valhalla Memorial Park Cemetery and Mortuary

Details
- Established: 1923; 103 years ago
- Location: 10621 Victory Boulevard; North Hollywood, California
- Country: United States
- Owned by: Service Corporation International
- Size: 63 acres (25 ha)
- Find a Grave: Valhalla Memorial Park Cemetery and Mortuary

Valhalla Memorial Park Cemetery and Mortuary is a cemetery and funeral home located at 10621 Victory Boulevard in North Hollywood, California, straddling the border between that Los Angeles neighborhood and Burbank.

The cemetery's east entrance features the Portal of the Folded Wings Shrine to Aviation, the final resting place for aviation pioneers — "barnstormers, daredevils and sundry architects of aviation". The cemetery is south of Hollywood Burbank Airport. It has memorials to Amelia Earhart and others, honoring their accomplishments. The portal features colorful tiled dome and female figures stretching their arms to the heavens. The cemetery was named "Valhalla" for the hall of slain warriors presided over by Odin, the Norse god of war and death, amongst other associations.

Among those interred in Valhalla are celebrities from the entertainment industry.

== History ==
=== Founding ===
Valhalla was founded in 1923 by Los Angeles financiers John R. Osborne and C. C. Fitzpatrick. The Spanish Mission Revival entrance structure was designed by architect Kenneth A. McDonald Jr. For the decorative stone castings, McDonald hired Italian-born sculptor Federico A. Giorgi, who had created 30-foot-tall (9.1 m) statues of elephants and lions for the 1916 epic film Intolerance, and helped to craft the exterior of downtown's Million Dollar Theater. The gateway to the new cemetery cost $140,000.

The rotunda was dedicated March 1, 1925, with a concert by English contralto Maude Elliott. Picnickers spread blankets on the surrounding grassy expanse between three reflecting pools and flat cemetery markers, which were a new concept at the time. It became a tourist attraction and was used for concerts that were broadcast over radio station KELW by station owner Earl L. White. Just five months after the dedication, Osborne and Fitzpatrick were convicted of fraud. They had repeatedly sold the same burial plots—as many as 16 times—and netted a profit of $3–4 million, according to the Los Angeles Times. They were fined $12,000 each and sentenced to 10 years in prison, but served less than three years.

=== State control ===
The cemetery was taken over by the state of California. It is unclear how long the state owned the 63-acre (250,000 m^{2}) cemetery, but Pierce Brothers bought it in 1950 and, within two years, closed the rotunda to vehicle traffic and moved the entry to the cemetery from Valhalla Drive in Burbank to Victory and Cahuenga boulevards in North Hollywood. There, they opened a two-story office building and mortuary.

On December 17, 1953—the 50th anniversary of Orville and Wilbur Wright's 12-second powered hop at Kitty Hawk—the rotunda was rededicated as the Portal of the Folded Wings, through the efforts of aviation fan and cemetery employee James Gillette. During the ceremony, the cremated remains of Walter R. Brookins, the first aviator to take a plane to an altitude of a mile and the Wright brothers' first civilian student, were interred.

When sculptor Giorgi died in 1963, he was buried outside the structure, near his masterpiece. Gillette was also buried outside, near the shrine he helped found.

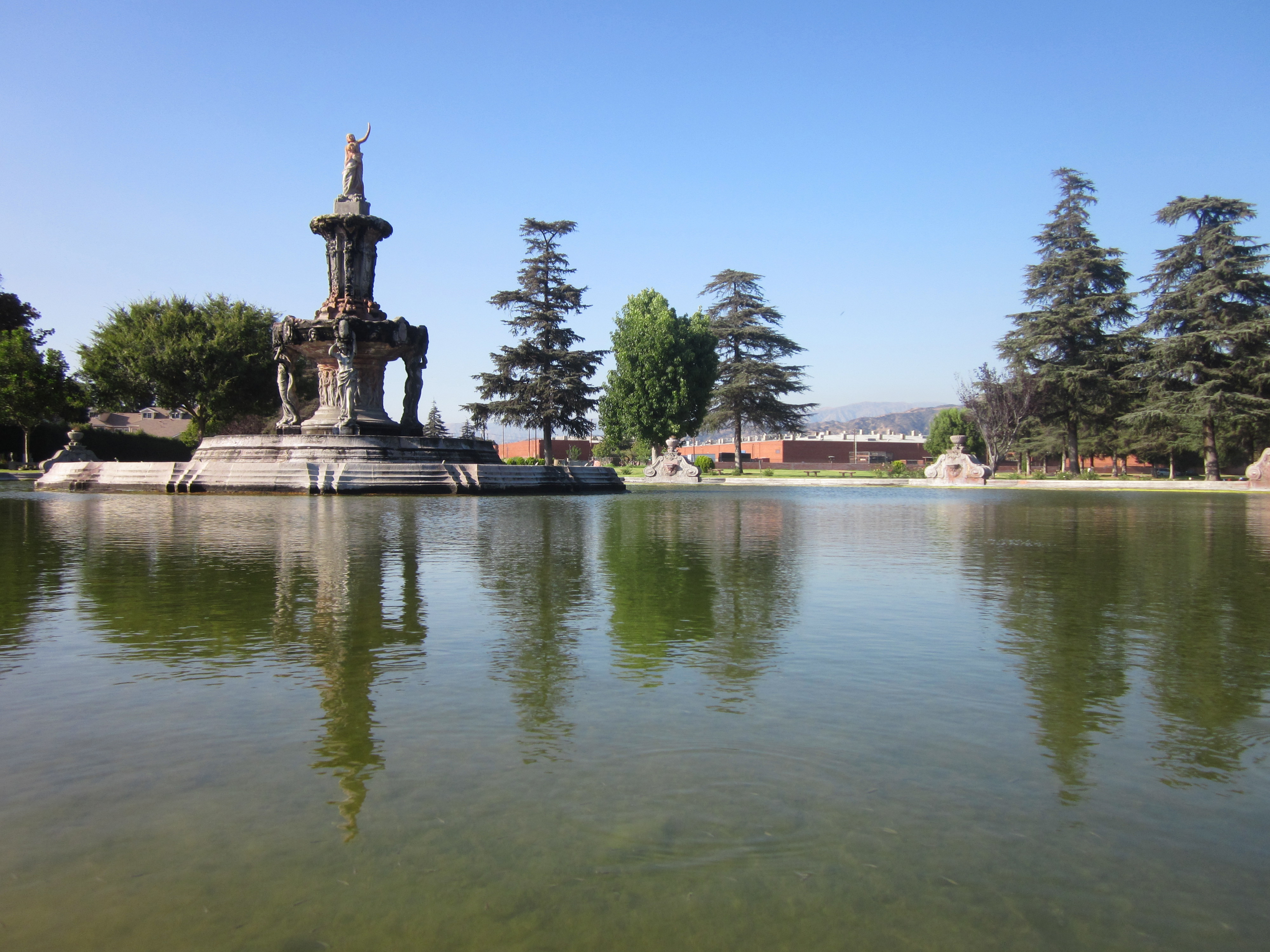
Fountain, GW Memorial, Valhalla Cemetery

The memorial was featured in Visiting... with Huell Howser Episode 426.

=== Sale of property ===
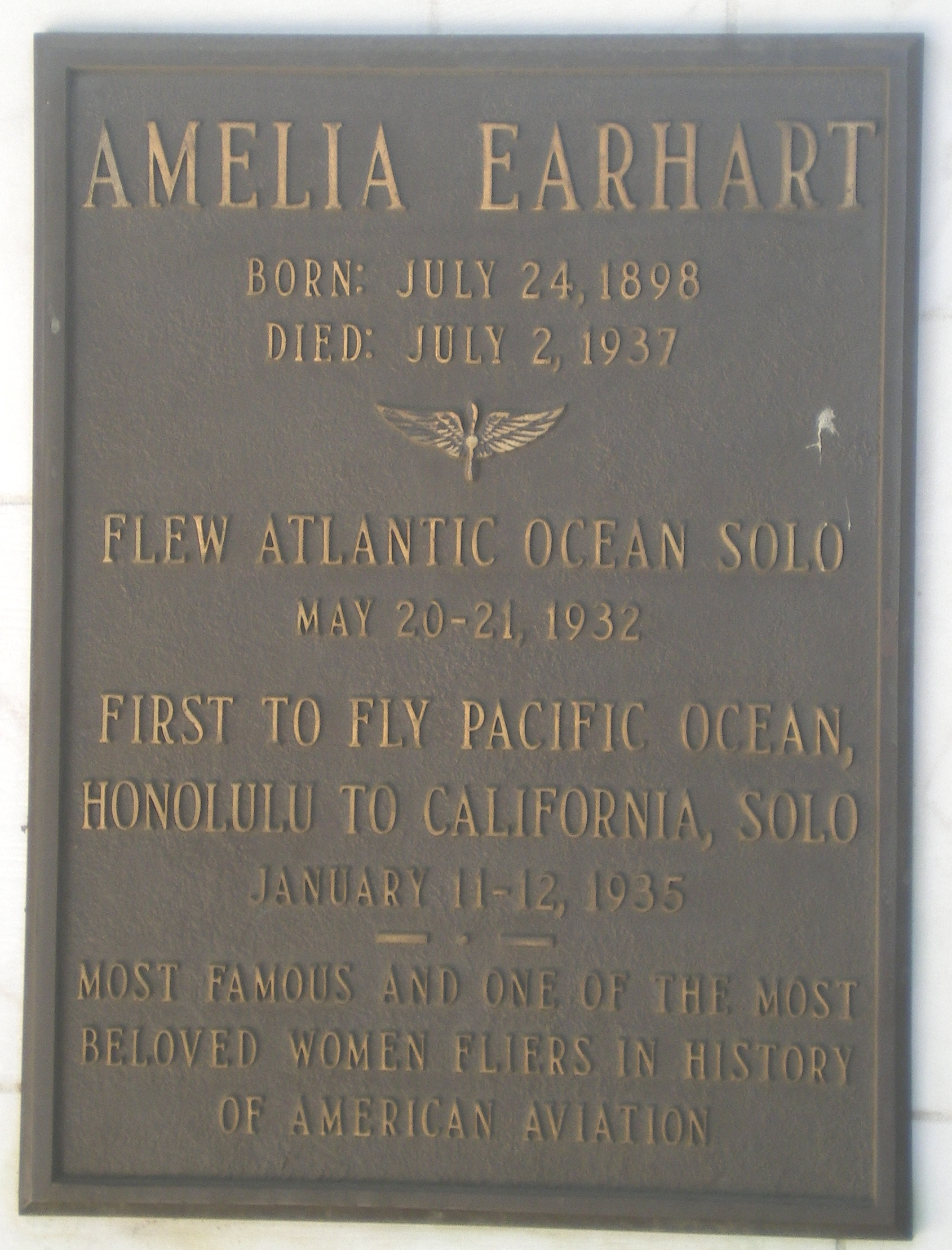
Amelia Earhart Memorial at Portal of the Folded Wings

In 1958, Pierce Brothers sold its family-owned chain of Southern California mortuaries and cemeteries to Texas financier Joe Allbritton, who sold 20 acres (81,000 m^{2}) of Valhalla for development. In 1991, the cemeteries and mortuaries were acquired by Service Corp. International of Houston, but the Pierce Brothers sign remains at Valhalla.

== Notable burials ==
Note: this is a partial list. Use the following alphabetical links to find a name.

=== A ===
- Fred Abbott (1874–1935), Major League Baseball player
- Bert Acosta (1895–1954), aviation pioneer
- Eddie Acuff (1903–1956), actor
- Ernie Adams (1895–1947), actor
- Luis Alberni (1886–1962), actor
- Mary Alden (1883–1946), actress
- James Anderson (1921–1969), actor
- Harry Antrim (1884–1967), actor (unmarked)
- Johnny Arthur (1883–1951), actor
- Edwin August (1883–1964), actor, director, screenwriter

=== B ===
- Jill Banner (1946–1982), actress
- Lionel Belmore (1867–1953), actor, director
- Bea Benaderet (1906–1968), actress, voice actress
- Belle Bennett (1891–1932), actress
- Willie Best (1916–1962), actor
- Clem Bevans (1879–1963), actor
- John G. Blystone (1892–1938), director
- Stanley Blystone (1894–1956), actor
- Symona Boniface (1894–1950), actress
- Al Bridge (1891–1957), actor
- Tyler Brooke (1886–1943), actor
- Walter Brookins (1889–1953), aviation pioneer
- Arthur Q. Bryan (1899–1959), actor, comedian, voice actor, radio personality
- Nana Bryant (1888–1955), actress
- Paul E. Burns (1881–1967), actor
- Frederick Burton (1871–1957), actor

=== C ===
- Georgia Caine (1876–1964), actress
- Brun Campbell (1884 –1952), musician
- Mark Mitchell Campbell (1897–1963), barnstormer, stuntman, Lockheed executive
- Yakima Canutt (1895–1986), actor, stuntman, director
- Jay Chamberlain (1925–2001), racing driver (unmarked)
- Naomi Childers (1892–1964), actress
- Ken Christy (1894–1962), actor
- Mae Clarke (1910–1992), actress
- Chester Clute (1891–1956), actor
- Edmund Cobb (1892–1974), actor
- John Collum (1926–1962), actor
- Baldwin Cooke (1888–1953), actor and comedian
- Melville Cooper (1896–1973), actor
- Jim Corey (1883–1956), actor
- Gino Corrado (1893–1982), actor
- Aneta Corsaut (1933–1995), actress
- Jane Cowl (1883–1950), actress
- Richard Crane (1918–1969), actor
- Nick Cravat (1912–1994), actor and stuntman

=== D ===
- Richard Day (1896–1972), motion picture set designer
- Claudia Dell (1910–1977), showgirl and actress
- Joe DeRita (1909–1993), actor, comedian, member of the Three Stooges
- Don Dillaway (1903–1982), actor
- Douglass Dumbrille (1889–1974), film and TV actor
- Edna Dunkerley (1907–1990), Studio Nanny for Hal Roach Studios Little Rascals and Our Gang Comedies

=== E ===
- Warren S. Eaton (1891–1966), aviator
- Cliff Edwards (1895–1971), actor, singer, voice-over artist

=== F ===
- Morgan Farley (1898–1988), actor
- Franklyn Farnum (1878–1961), actor
- Eddie Firestone (1920–2007), actor
- Louise E. Francis (1869-1932), journalist

=== G ===
- Ceferino Garcia (1906–1981), boxer
- Louis Gasnier, film director
- Gorgeous George (1915–1963), professional wrestler
- Gladys George (1904–1954), actress
- Lowell Gilmore (1906–1960), actor
- Leslie Goodwins (1899–1969), film director and screenwriter
- Lita Grey (1908–1995), actress and 2nd wife of Charlie Chaplin

=== H ===
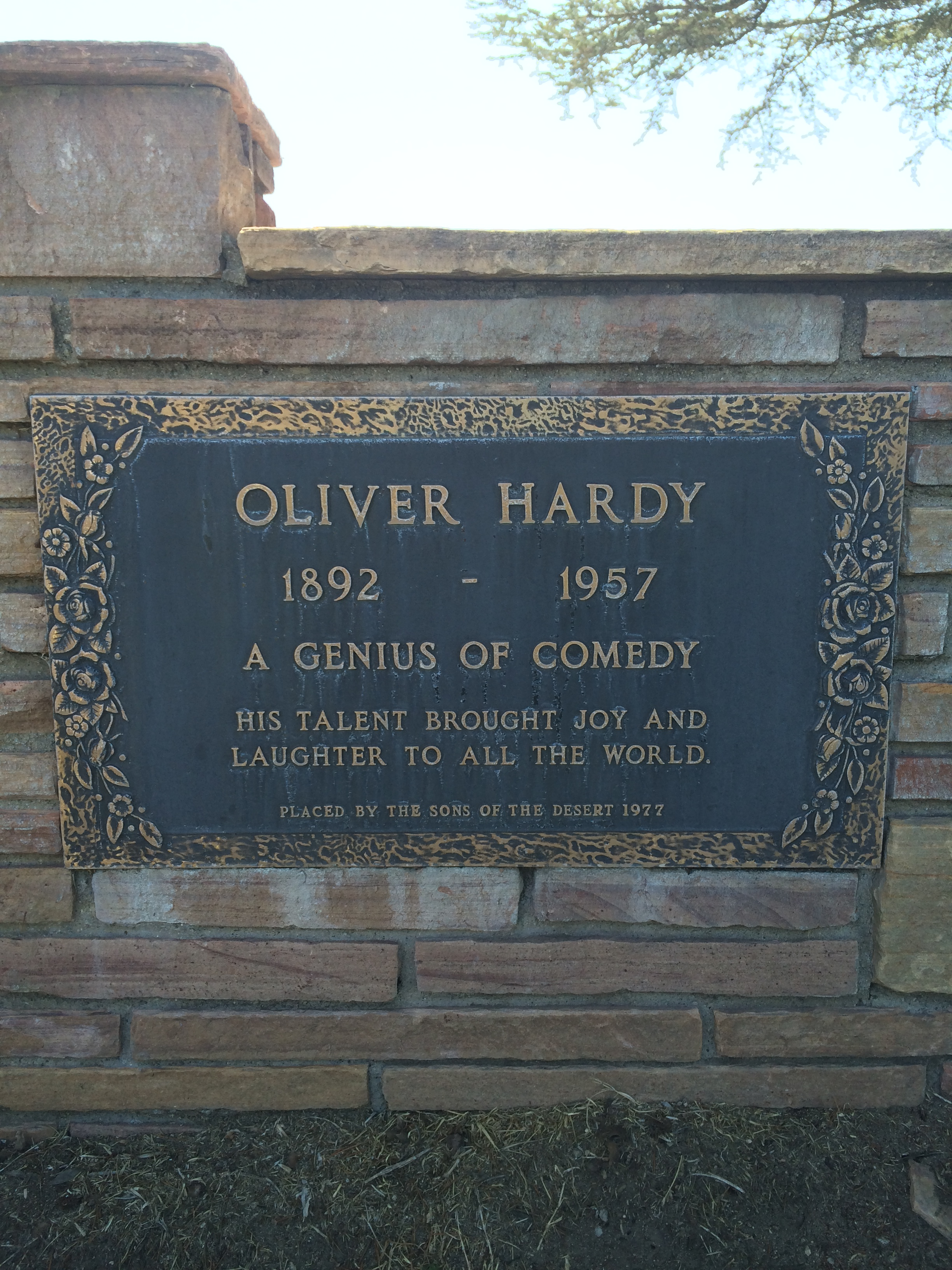
Marker for Oliver Hardy

- Oren W. Haglund (1905–1972), production manager of eleven ABC/Warner Brothers television series from 1955 to 1961
- Jonathan Hale (1891–1966), actor
- Florence Halop (1923–1986), actress
- Lois Hamilton (1943–1999), model, author, actress, artist, aviator
- Mahlon Hamilton (1880–1960), actor
- Oliver Hardy (1892–1957), actor and comedian, partner of Stan Laurel
- Leigh Harline (1907–1969), composer
- Dell Henderson (1877–1956), actor, director, writer
- Colin Higgins (1941–1988), director & screenwriter

=== I ===
- Roger Imhof (1875–1958), actor

=== J ===
- Selmer Jackson (1888–1971), actor

=== K ===
- Fred Kelsey (1884–1961), pioneer actor
- Crauford Kent (1881–1953), actor
- Kathleen Key (1903–1954), actress
- Charles Criswell King (1907–1982), psychic known as The Amazing Criswell
- Bert Kinner (1882–1957), aviation pioneer
- Fuzzy Knight (1901–1976), actor
- June Knight (1913–1987), actress and dancer
- Theodore Kosloff (1882–1956), actor, choreographer, ballet dancer
- Paul Kruger (1895–1960), actor

=== L ===
- Frank Lackteen (1897–1968), actor
- Alice Lake (1895–1967), actress
- Elsa Lanchester (1902–1986), actress
- Sheldon Lewis (1868–1958), actor
- Robert Lowery (1913–1971), actor
- Sam Lufkin (1891–1952), actor
- James Luisi (1928–2002), actor

=== M ===
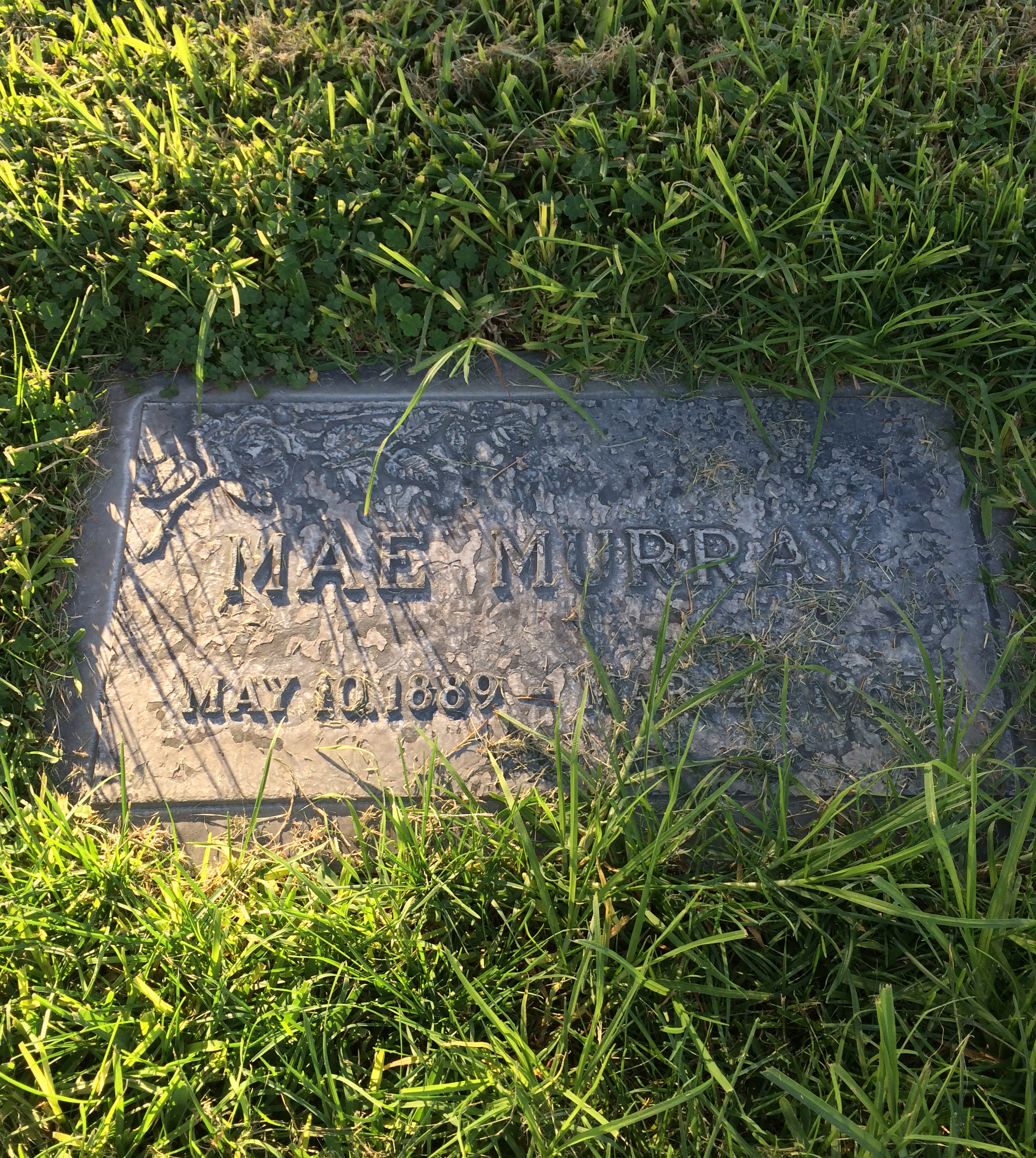
Gravestone of Mae Murray

- Barton MacLane (1902–1969), actor
- Kermit Maynard (1897–1971), actor
- Sam McDaniel (1886–1962), actor and brother of performers Hattie McDaniel & Etta McDaniel
- Francis McDonald (1891–1968), actor
- George Melford (1877–1961), actor, director
- Michu Meszaros (1939–2016), actor and circus performer
- Bob Mizer (1922–1992), photographer
- John Moisant (1868–1910), aviation pioneer
- Matilde Moisant (1878–1964), pioneer aviator
- Mantan Moreland (1902–1973), actor
- Kay Morley (1920–2020), actress
- Mittie Morris (1874–1953), social reformer
- Mae Murray (1885–1965), actress

=== N ===
- Buddy Noonan (1937–1989), producer, The Roving Kind syndicated TV series
- Fayard Nicholas (1914–2006), actor and dancer
- James Nusser (1905-1979), actor

=== O ===
- Wheeler Oakman (1890–1949), actor

=== P ===
- Virginia Pearson (1886–1958), pioneering film actress
- Eddy Polo (1875–1961), actor, stuntman, the first to parachute off the Eiffel Tower

=== R ===
- "Slapsie Maxie" Rosenbloom (1904–1976), champion boxer, actor
- Gail Russell (1924–1961), actress

=== S ===
- Lewis Sargent (1903–1970), actor
- Charles Sellon (1870–1937), actor
- Eve Southern (1900–1972), actress
- Charles Stevens (1893–1964), actor (unmarked)
- Onslow Stevens (1902–1977), actor (unmarked)
- Madame Sul-Te-Wan (1873–1959), actress

=== T ===
- Charlie Taylor (1868–1956), aviation engineer
- Lyle Tayo (1889–1971), actress
- Alma Tell (1898–1937), actress
- Alice Terry (1900–1987), actress
- Roland Totheroh (1890–1967), cinematographer
- Lorna Thayer (1919–2005), actress

=== V ===
- Alberta Vaughn (1904–1992), actress
- Martha Vickers (1925–1971), actress and model
- Joey D. Vieira (1944-2025), actor
- Josef von Stroheim (1922–2002), sound editor (unmarked)

=== W ===
- Anna Mae Walthall (1894-1950), actress
- Ken Weatherwax (1955–2014), actor
- Rudd Weatherwax (1907–1985), animal trainer
- Bud Westmore (1918–1973), makeup artist
- Alice White (1904–1983), actress
- Dave Willock (1909–1990), actor
- Henry Willson (1911–1978), talent agent
- Frederick Worlock (1886–1973), actor

=== Y ===
- Chief Yowlachie (1891–1966), Native American actor

== See also ==
- List of cemeteries in the United States
