= John Franklin Bruce Carruthers =

The Reverend John Franklin Bruce Carruthers
- Chaplain to the Portal of the Folded Wings Shrine to Aviation
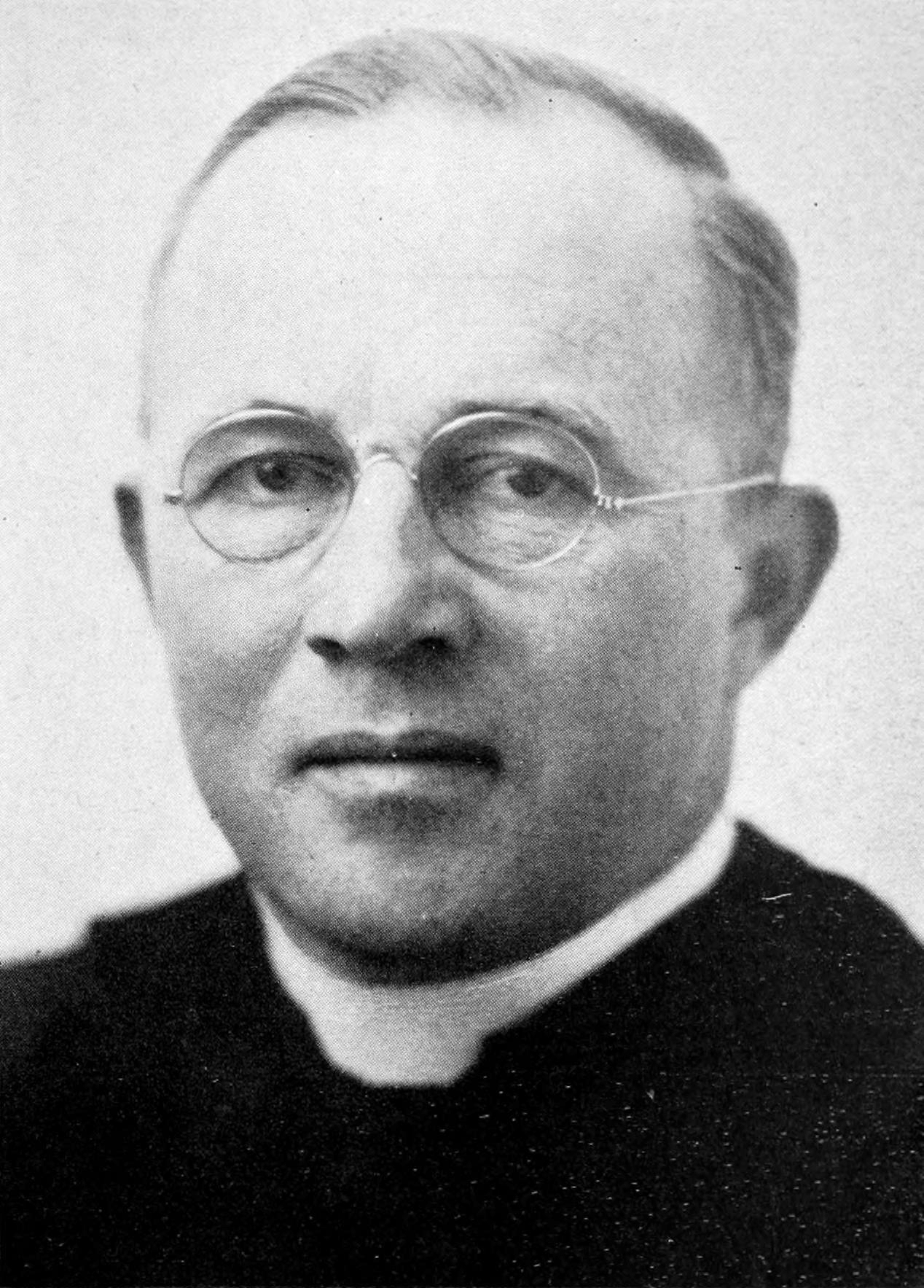
- Carruthers circa 1940
- Church: Presbyterian Church (USA)
- Other posts: Head of Bible Dept., Lafayette College (1919–1924)

Orders
- Ordination: 1918

Personal details
- Born: John Franklin Bruce Carruthers; August 31, 1889 Fort Scott, Kansas, United States
- Died: January 13, 1960 (aged 70) Los Angeles, California, United States
- Buried: Valhalla Memorial Park Cemetery
- Denomination: Presbyterian
- Spouse: Mabel Grandin (m. 1919)
- Children: John, Jane, Priscilla, Polly
- Occupation: Minister, Chaplain, Academic
- Profession: Theologian, Author
- Education: Princeton University, Princeton Theological Seminary

John Franklin Bruce Carruthers (August 31, 1889 – January 13, 1960) was a reverend who ministered to early aviators.

His son, John Franklin Bruce Carruthers, presented the Carruthers Aviation Collection to Claremont McKenna College, in Claremont, California, in 1950. Through subsequent gifts and purchases the collection contains about 4,000 volumes.

He was the chaplain to the Portal of the Folded Wings Shrine to Aviation, in Los Angeles, California.

== Early life ==
He was born in Fort Scott, Kansas, on August 31, 1889, to James B. Carruthers and Anna Wood.

He received his A.B. from Princeton University in 1912. He received his A.M. from Princeton in 1917 and later graduated from the Princeton Theological Seminary.

== Career ==
From 1919 to 1924, he was head of the Bible Department at Lafayette College, in Easton, Pennsylvania. In 1933, he was the research assistant of Dr. Rufus B. von KleinSmid, president of the University of Southern California.

== Affiliations ==
Carruthers was a member of the aviation fraternity, Alpha Eta Rho and served as its national historian.

== Publications ==
- The Small Business Problem as I See It (1940)
- Line and Staff. Camp Hopkins (1942)
- Scrapbook of Early Aeronautica with William Upcott
- The Thirteenth Disciple, Founder, Church of All Sinners
