= Portal of the Folded Wings Shrine to Aviation =

Memorial in California, United States

- Portal of the Folded Wings Shrine to Aviation and Museum
- U.S. National Register of Historic Places
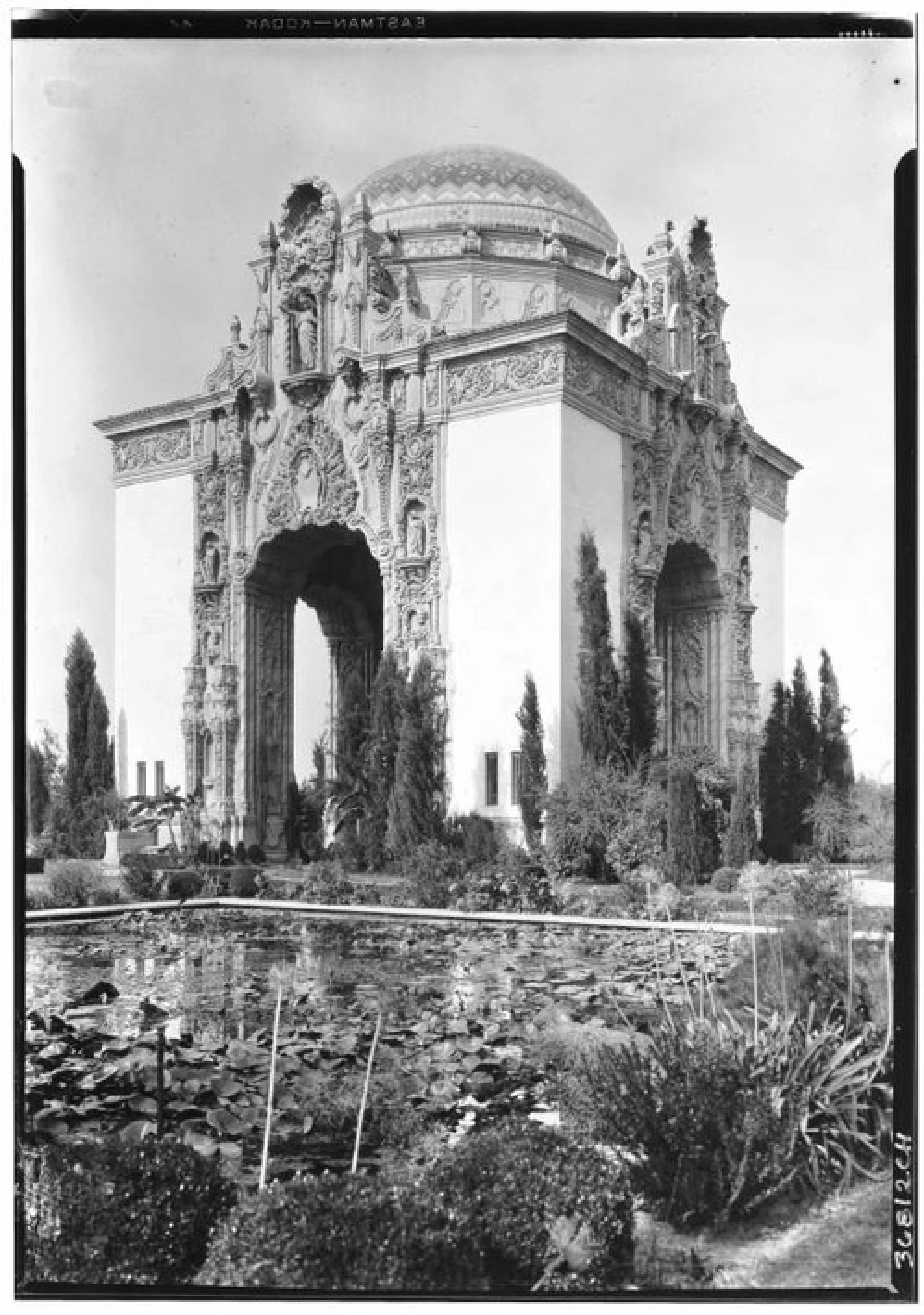
- The structure in 1929

- Location within the Los Angeles metropolitan area
- Location: 10621 Victory Boulevard, North Hollywood, California
- Coordinates: 34°11′25″N 118°21′14″W
- Built: 1924
- Architect: Kenneth A. MacDonald Jr.
- Architectural style: Spanish Colonial Revival
- Restored: 1996
- Restored by: The Sculpture Conservation Studio
- NRHP reference No.: 98000246
- Added to NRHP: March 18, 1998

Portal of the Folded Wings Shrine to Aviation, also known as Valhalla Memorial Rotunda and The Rotunda, is a 72-foot-tall (22 m) shrine to aviation located at the former entrance to Valhalla Memorial Park Cemetery in North Hollywood and Burbank, California. The shrine, which has been called Arlington of the Air and Westminster Abbey of Reverence for the Founders of the Air Age, was entered into the National Register of Historic Places in 1998.

== History ==
Valhalla Memorial Park Cemetery was founded by John B. Osborne and C.C. Fitzpatrick in 1923. The following year, architect Kenneth A. MacDonald Jr., known for Spreckels Mansion and the Broadway-Spring Arcade, built a large arched rotunda at the entrance, with the cast stone and concrete carved by Federico Augustino Giorgi, the sculptor who also created the Babylonian elephants and lions for the film Intolerance. The structure, which cost more than $140,000 ($2.63 million in 2025) to construct, was dedicated on March 1, 1925 and became a landmark in the sparsely populated area where it was built. It was also the site of Sunday afternoon opera concerts throughout the 1920s and 30s.

An aircraft warning light was added to the structure in 1930, installed by Lockheed when the nearby Burbank Airport opened, and in 1950, a new entrance was created for Valhalla Memorial Park Cemetery, away from this structure.

Aviation enthusiast James Gillette was impressed by the structure and its proximity to Burbank Airport. He conceived a plan to use the structure as a shrine to aviation, something he worked toward for two decades. The shrine was dedicated on December 17, 1953, the 50th anniversary of powered flight. The dedication ceremony was presided by Lieutenant General Ira C. Eaker and officiated by Reverend John Carruthers. Charles Edward Taylor and Matilde Moisant attended the ceremony, as did the wife of Walter Richard Brookins, whose ashes had recently been interred under the structure.

The shrine was re-dedicated in 1956, organized by James Gillette. Roy Knabenshue was honored by Warren S. Eaton and John Franklin Bruce Carruthers at the re-dedication, with William Lear, Paul Mantz, Matilde Moisant, and George Otto Noville in attendance.

On July 18, 1969, a twin-Piper Navajo that had just taken off from Burbank Airport crashed into the dome atop the shrine, killing the pilot and one passenger, while another passenger survived. The dome was repaired at a cost of $70,000 ($614,564 in 2025).

The 1994, the Northridge Earthquake damaged the shrine's decorative facade, although the structure itself remained sturdy. In 1996, the shrine underwent restoration and conservation work, including bringing it to modern earthquake standards. The interior was also renovated and converted to an aviation museum. On May 27, 1996, the shrine was re-dedicated once again, this time by Dr. Tom Crouch, Chairman of the Aeronautics Department at the Smithsonian Institution's National Air and Space Museum.

On March 18, 1997, Linda Finch was hosted at the shrine as she began her re-creation of Amelia Earhart's 1937 world flight. Several aviation dignitaries, family members of aviation pioneers, and more than 200 visitors attended.

The shrine was added to the National Register of Historic Places in 1998. It was also registered with California State Parks that same year.

== Design ==
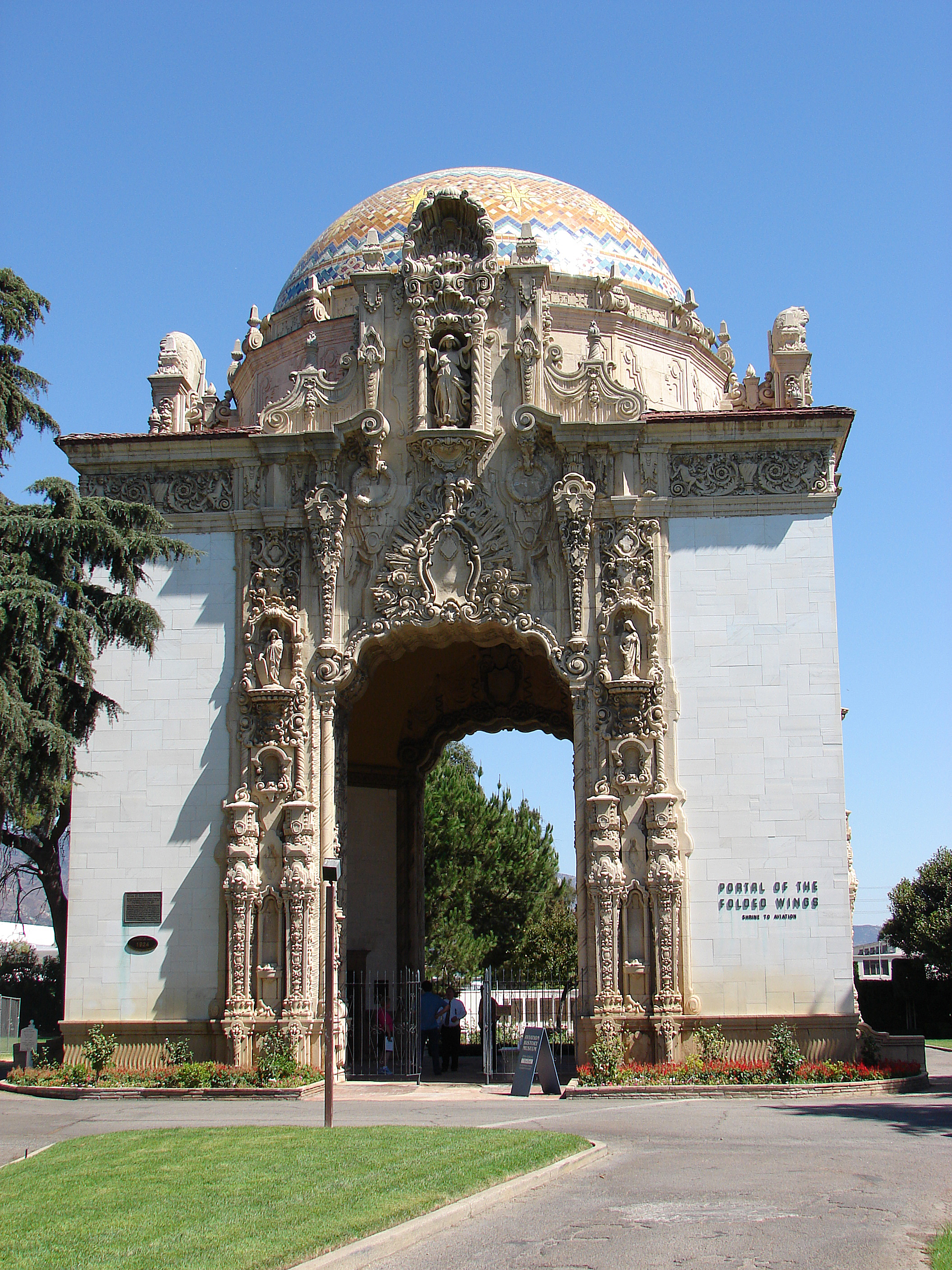
The structure in 2006

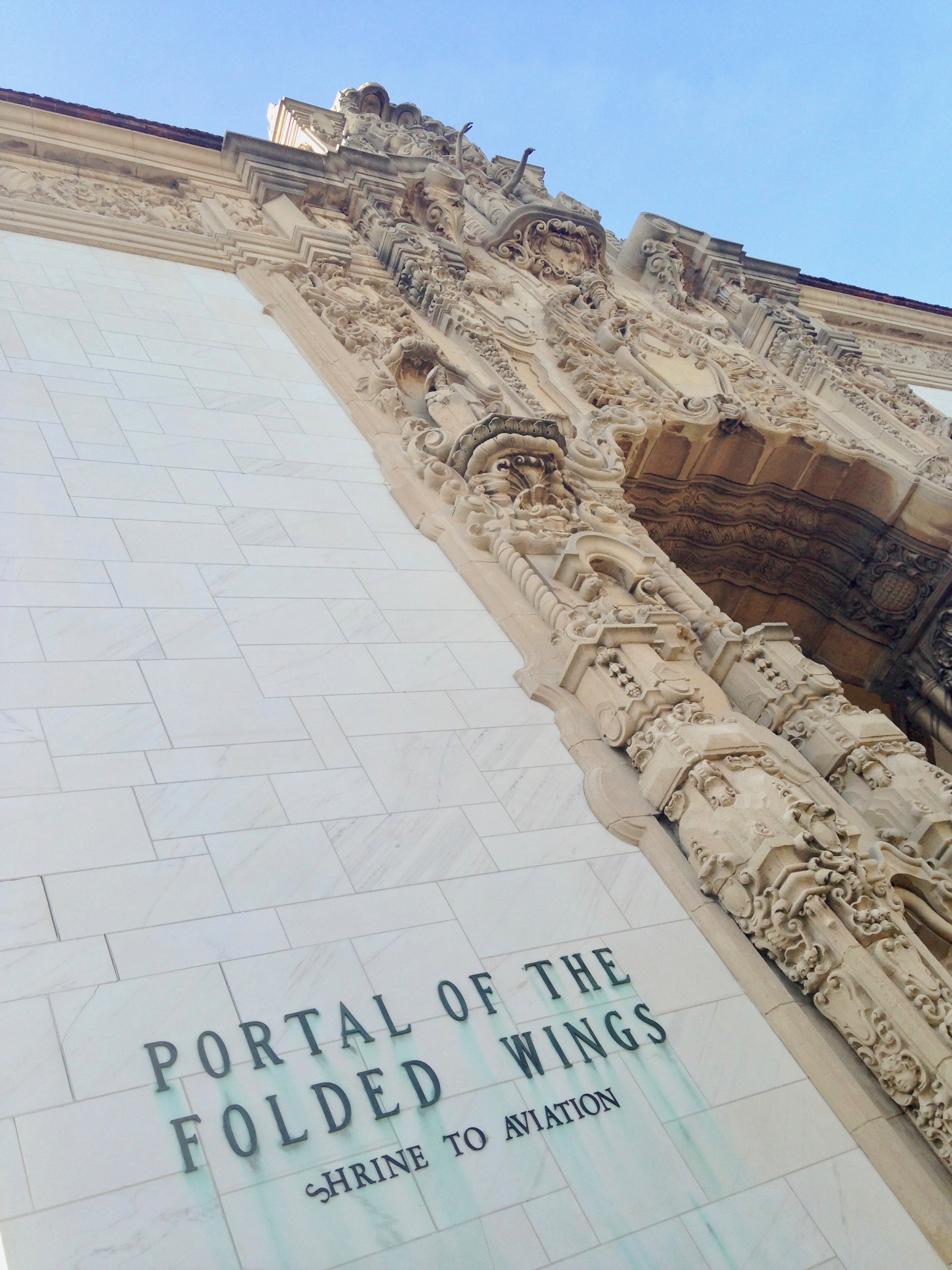
The structure up close

The shrine is an arched, four pillared structure made of stone, Colorado yule white marble, and steel-framed reinforced concrete. It is square in plan with 50-foot sides and tops out 72 feet above the ground. Each side is identical excepting some signage and is aligned with the cardinal directions. The roof follows the square building plan, is made of made of concrete, terra cotta, and red Spanish style tiles, and is surrounded by copper flashing.

The shrine features a Spanish Colonial Revival design with Churrigueresque detailing and a cast stone skirt. Small Cupid faces peer out between garlands, geometric designs, and within empty niches above the skirt. Just below the roofline, the building is wrapped by a continuous cast stone facade featuring multiple urns flanked by petaled swirls and winged Cupids. Topping the shrine is a mortar-based cupola covered in mosaic tiles that form a multicolored repeating geometric pattern with a bursting-star at the center. Sculptural elements, including full-size figures, flora, swirl and flame finials, obelisks, and scrollwork are located on the roof line, the most noticeable being an elaborate 12-foot clam shell niche that both frames and provides a pedestal for a life-size Lady figure that reflects those of ancient Rome.

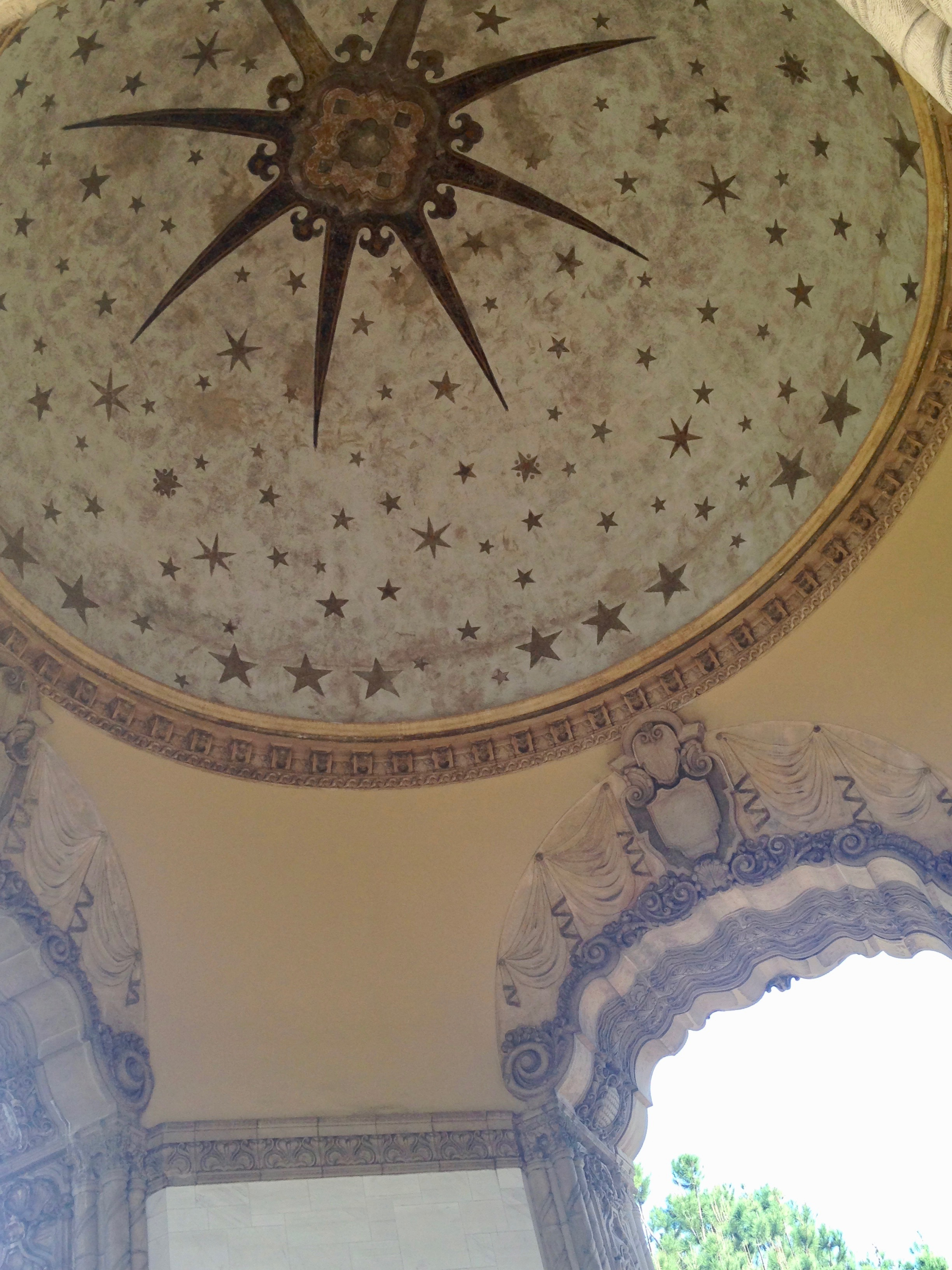
Embellishment under the rotunda

The shrine's four pillars each house approximately 10x10 foot rooms that are accessed through large steel-frame doors with bronze sheathing and ornamental rosettes. Each room also has 1x1 inch white ceramic tile floors and two windows featuring bronze grillwork. Between each pillar is an arch that enters to a flagstone-floored interior with a dome-shaped ceiling that features a mural resembling a starry night. Niches with figures are located on each side of each arch. Additional interior ornament include geometric and twisted roping designs, repetitive cross-hatching, wreaths, and realistic-looking garlands of either fruits or flowers.

== Burials ==
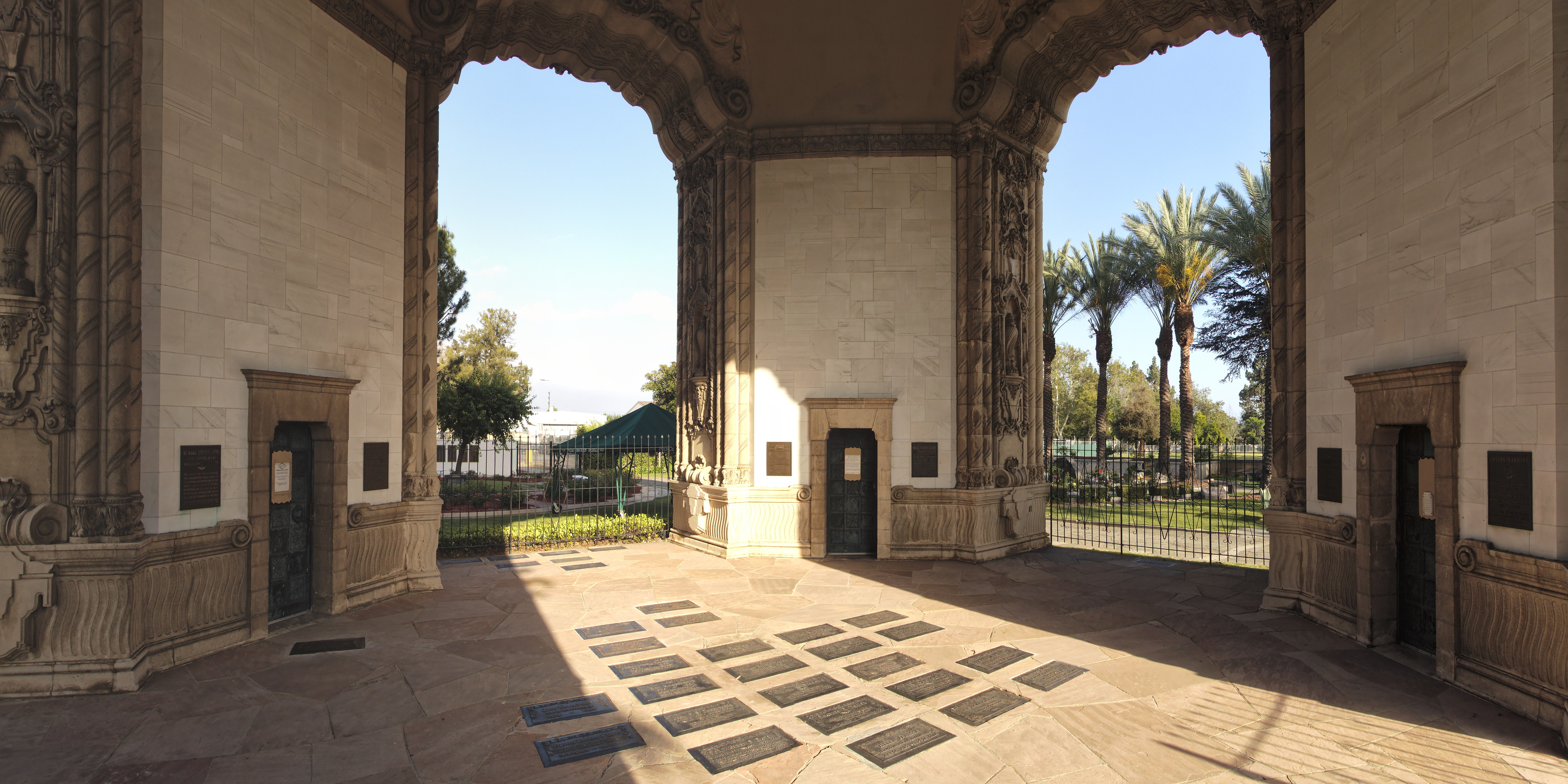
Marker plaques inside the shrine

The shrine contains cenotaphs for Amelia Earhart and Billy Mitchell and is also the burial site for thirteen aviation pioneers, including:

- Bertrand Blanchard Acosta (1895–1954), test pilot who set an endurance record for time in the air
- Walter Richard Brookins (1889–1953), barnstormer taught by the Wright brothers who performed many aviation firsts and set many records
- Mark Mitchell Campbell (1897–1963), barnstormer, stunt pilot, and Lockheed executive
- Warren Samuel Eaton (1891–1966), Colonel and early pilot who built airplanes for Lincoln Beachy
- Winfield Bertrum Kinner (1882–1957), aircraft manufacturer who built the first certified aircraft engine and designed the first folding wing
- Augustus Roy Knabenshue (1876–1960), dirigible pilot and manufacturer who saved the Wright Flyer from destruction
- Elizabeth Lippincott McQueen (1878–1958), founder of the Women's International Association of Aeronautics
- John Bevins Moisant (1868–1910), barnstormer who designed the first all metal aircraft and was the first pilot to fly passengers over the English Channel
- Matilde Moisant (1878–1964), second licensed female pilot in the United States
- Hilder Florentina Smith (1890–1977), aerial acrobat and parachute jumper, wife of James Floyd Smith
- James Floyd Smith (1884–1956), test pilot and parachute pioneer who set numerous altitude records, husband of Hilder Florentina Smith
- Carl Browne Squier (1893–1967), barnstormer, test pilot, and Lockheed Company Vice President
- Charles Edward Taylor (1868–1956), machinist who designed and built the first engine for the Wright Flyer

John Franklin Bruce Carruthers, air historian and Portal of the Folded Wings chaplain, is also buried at the shrine, as was Jimmie Angel, the pilot who discovered Angel Falls. However, Angel's ashes were later removed and scattered over the falls.

Shrine sculptor Federico Augustino Giorgi was buried "at the point offering the best view of the portal" and James Gillette was also buried at a site facing the portal.
