= Mittie Morris =

American activist (1874–1953)

- Born: 1874; Missouri, U.S.
- Died: July 11, 1953 (aged 78–79)
- Resting place: Valhalla Memorial Park Cemetery

Mittie I. Morris (1874 – July 11, 1953) was an American social reformer, known as Mother Morris. She was the founder of the Faith Home Rescue Mission.

== Biography ==
Mittie I. Morris was born in 1874 in Missouri. In 1922, she moved to California. In 1924, she founded the Faith Home Rescue Mission. She was known as "Mother Morris" on Skid Row, Los Angeles.

She died on July 11, 1953, aged 78, at her home. She was buried at the Valhalla Memorial Park Cemetery in North Hollywood.
