= Tom Gunn =

Chinese-American aviator (1890–1925)

- Tan Gen
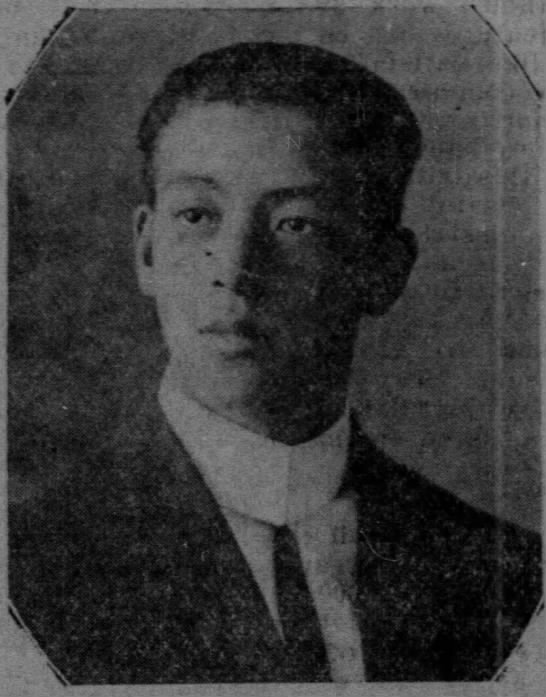
- Gunn in 1913
- Born: October 13, 1890; San Francisco, California, United States
- Died: 1925 (aged 34–35)
- Occupations: Aviator and inventor

Tom Tak Gunn (1890–1925) was the first Chinese-American pilot in the United States graduating from the Curtiss School of Aviation class of 1911 and earned pilot's license no. 131 on June 19, 1912. He popularized passenger flight in Hawaii and became the head of the Chinese air force.

== Early life ==
Gunn was born in San Francisco on October 13, 1890. He had at least three sisters and at least one brother. He attended the Oakland Polytechnic High School (also known as Central High School). There, he took classes in engineering and met his future fiancé, Lily Tong.

== Aviation career ==
=== Training and First Flight ===
Gunn was mentored by aviators Lincoln Beachey at the Curtiss School in Hammondsport, NY, Warren S. Eaton, Horace Kearney, and Glen Martin. His nephew, Curtis Joe, recalled hearing that Gunn had learned to fly in Los Angeles and San Diego.

On February 19, 1912, Gunn made his first public flight at the international aviation meet in Emeryville, California. The San Francisco Examiner reported that hundreds from San Francisco's Chinese-American community turned out to see him. Beachey and other pilots were apprehensive because Gunn was relatively inexperienced, but he landed safely.

=== Emeryville Crash ===
On February 22, 1912, Gunn's plane crashed at the Emeryville meet, dropping 150 feet to the ground. The plane was destroyed, and the building it crashed into was badly damaged. Gunn's manager, Warren S. Eaton, said the accident was due to the plane's motor stalling.

The San Francisco Examiner reported that Gunn fell from a height of several hundred feet, saying "that he was not killed outright is little short of marvelous." Gunn's jaw was dislocated and his body was covered in severe lacerations. He was taken to the Oakland Central Hospital, where his doctor described his chance of recovery as good.

=== Travels and Death ===
Gunn officially received his pilot's license on June 19, 1912. On August 4, 1912, Gunn demonstrated his flying skills for three of Chinese president Sun Yat-sen's children and General Lan Tien Wei. After watching Gunn make four flights around the airfield, Wei went for a ride in Gunn's plane. Wei "expressed himself as delighted with the experience" upon landing, and recommended that the Chinese government recruit Gunn as a pilot.

In May 1913, Gunn and Lily Tong announced their engagement. Gunn left San Francisco for China in June 1913, but promised to return for Tong at the end of eight months.

On June 10, 1913, Gunn arrived in Honolulu, where he planned to stay for a month before traveling to China. On July 13, 1913, in front of a crowd of thousands, he carried his first Hawaiian passengers.

Gunn had been offered a commission as a captain in the Chinese army, though he intended to spend his first six months in the country making freelance exhibition flights. However, new president Yuan Shikai, fearing that Gunn intended to side with his political rivals, put a bounty of 5,000 dollars on his head. Gunn traveled to the Philippines instead, where he was credited with introducing air mail.

By 1913, Gunn had built six different types of plane. He preferred to fly planes he had made himself, explaining that "I always understand a machine I build myself much better."

Gunn died in a rickshaw accident in China in 1925. There is speculation that his death may have been an assassination in disguise. Princess Der Ling, who claimed to have known him, said, he "died for his ideals, a martyr to 'winged China'."
