= Matilde Moisant =

American pioneer aviator (1878–1964)

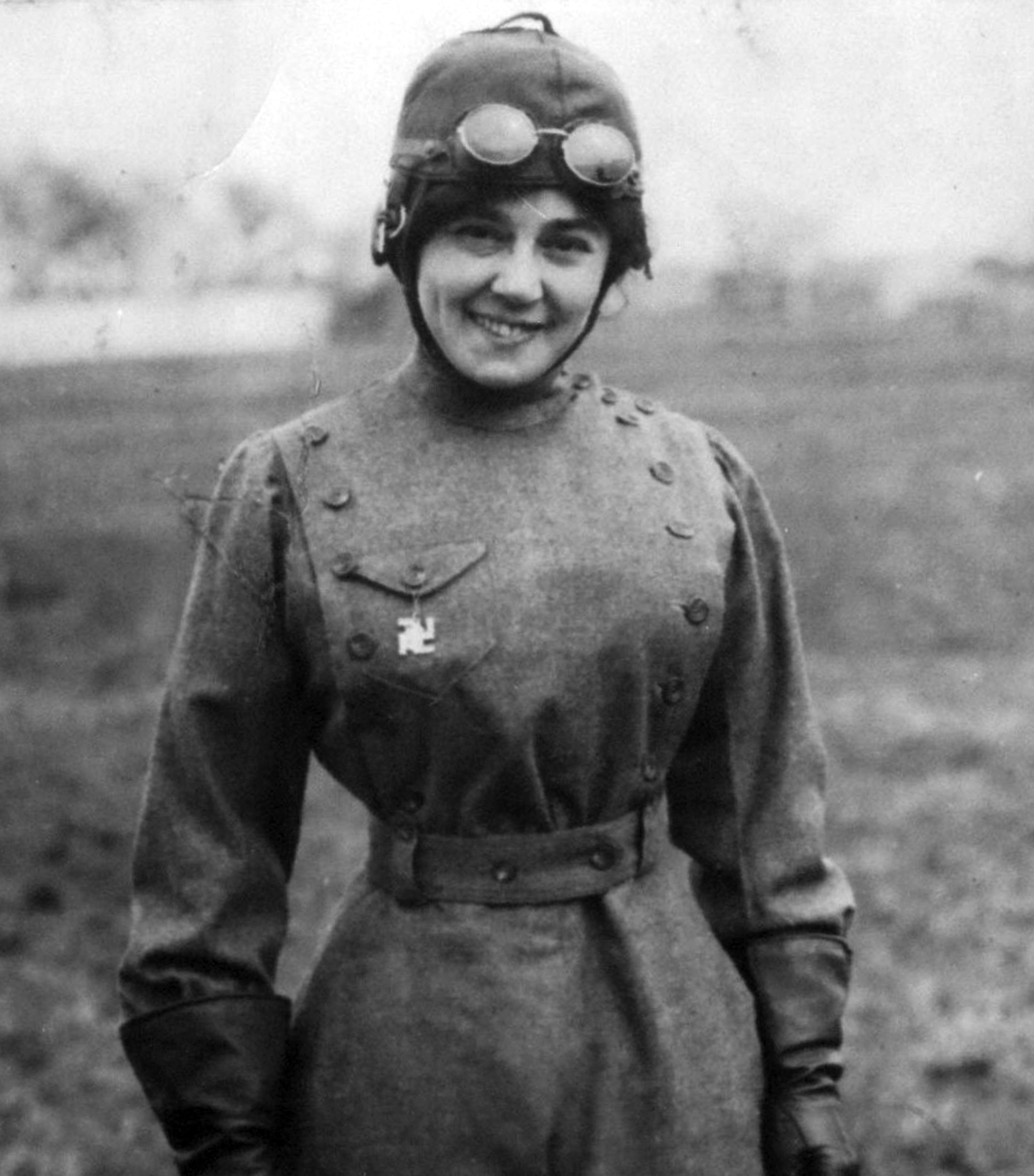
- Moisant in 1912 (uniform with auspicious swastika medallion)
- Born: Matilde Josephine Moisant; September 13, 1878; Earl Park, Indiana, U.S.
- Died: February 5, 1964 (aged 85); Glendale, California, U.S.
- Resting place: Portal of the Folded Wings Shrine to Aviation, Valhalla Memorial Park Cemetery, Los Angeles, California
- Education: Moisant Aviation School, New York
- Occupation: Aviator
- Known for: Being the second woman in the United States to obtain a pilot's license, as certified by the Aero Club of America

Moisant (left) and Harriet Quimby, the first two women in the United States to obtain pilot's licenses (photo circa 1911–12)

Matilde Josephine Moisant (September 13, 1878 – February 5, 1964) was an American pioneer aviator who became the second woman in the United States to obtain a pilot's license.

== Early life ==
Moisant was born on September 13, 1878, in Earl Park, Indiana, to Médore Moisant and Joséphine Fortier. Both parents were French Canadians. Her siblings include George, John, Annie M., Alfred Moisant, Louise J. and Eunice Moisant. John and Alfred were also aviators. In 1880, the family was living in Manteno, Illinois, and her father was working as a farmer.

== Career ==
Moisant learned to fly at Alfred's Moisant Aviation School on Long Island, New York. On August 13, 1911, a few weeks after her friend Harriet Quimby received her pilot's certificate, Matilde Moisant became the second woman pilot certified by the Aero Club of America. She pursued a career in exhibition flying, known as barn storming. In September 1911, she flew in the air show at Nassau Boulevard airfield in Garden City, New York and, while competing against Hélène Dutrieu, Moisant broke the women's altitude world record and won the Rodman-Wanamaker trophy by flying to 1,200 feet (370 m).

== Retirement ==
Moisant stopped flying on April 14, 1912, in Wichita Falls, Texas when her plane crashed (the same day that the Titanic struck an iceberg and only two days before her friend, Harriet Quimby, became the first woman to pilot an aircraft across the English Channel). A few months later on July 1, 1912, Quimby was killed when she was thrown from her plane. Although Moisant recovered from her injuries, she gave up flying. During World War I she volunteered at the front in France. She spent several years dividing her time between the U.S. and the family plantation in El Salvador, before returning to the Los Angeles area.

== Death ==
Matilde Moisant died in 1964 in Glendale, California, aged 85, and was interred in the Portal of Folded Wings Shrine to Aviation in Valhalla Memorial Park Cemetery, North Hollywood, Los Angeles, California.

== Timeline ==
- 1878 Birth in Indiana
- 1880 Living in Manteno, Kankakee, Illinois
- 1880 US Census in Manteno, Illinois
- 1900 US Census in California
- 1910 Death of her brother
- 1911 Received pilot's certificate
- 1911 Won Rodman-Wanamaker altitude trophy
- 1912 Crash in Texas on April 14
- 1920 Living in Los Angeles, California
- 1920 US Census in Los Angeles, California
- 1930 US Census in La Crescenta, California
- 1964 Death in California
- 1964 Burial In Valhalla Memorial Park Cemetery
