= Alpha Eta Rho =

American professional aviation fraternity

- ΑΗΡ
- Coat of Arms of Alpha Eta Rho
- Founded: April 10, 1929; 97 years ago University of Southern California
- Type: Professional
- Affiliation: Independent
- Status: Active
- Emphasis: Aviation
- Scope: National (United States)
- Motto: "Collegiate Aviation Leaders of Today... Aviation Industry Leaders of Tomorrow"
- Colors: Chrome yellow, Black, and Red
- Publication: The Beam
- Chapters: 140+
- Members: 70,000+ lifetime
- Headquarters: 2160 W Case Rd, Hanger 9 Suite 104; Columbus, Ohio 43235; United States
- Website: www.alphaetarho.org

Alpha Eta Rho (ΑΗΡ) is a coed international professional college aviation fraternity. Established in 1929 at the University of Southern California, it was the first professional aviation fraternity. It connects the aviation industry with educational institutions and mentors college students toward successful careers in aviation, aeronautical engineering, and aerospace sciences.

Alpha Eta Rho has chartered over 140 chapters both domestically and internationally.

== History ==
Earl W. Hill, a professor of aviation at the University of Southern California, established Alpha Eta Rho on April 10, 1929. The fraternity's purpose was to bring together students interested in commercial aviation for education and research and to connect them with professionals in the various aviation branches. It was formed with no boundaries for gender, race, religion, or nationality.

Along with Hill, the fraternity's founding members were John Bonadiman, Joe Burchman, Adam E. Diehl, Dr. Rudolph Hirschberg, Richard Mogle, and Walter Sykes. Mogle was elected the student chapter's first president.

An alumni and associate group was organized at the same time and included founding members Herbert Hoover Jr., James G. Wooley who was the vice president of Western Air Express, and five alumni and several instructors of the University of Southern California. Hill was elected the fraternity's national president and served in that capacity until he died in 1950. Charles Lindbergh later served as the fraternity's first vice president and Dr. John Franklin Bruce Carruthers was its national historian.

By the end of 1933, the fraternity had 39 collegiate members, 72 alumni members, and 55 associate members. New members were selected based on scholarship, character, and an interest in aviation.

Because it accepted international students and its founders included an exchange professor from Germany, the fraternity called itself "international". This label was also aspirational, as Alpha Eta Rho planned on expanding to Canada, Germany, and other countries. The fraternity expanded to other campuses, including the University of California, Los Angeles; Duke University; North Carolina State University; Northwestern University; Pasadena Junior College; San Diego State University; and San Jose State University. In 1937, the fraternity was incorporated in the State of California as Alpha Eta Rho International Aviation Fraternity with headquarters in Los Angeles.

The fraternity's activities included meetings with guest speakers, weekly luncheons, trips to airplane factories and related industries, and cross-country flights. Some chapters had a flying team that engaged in intercollegiate aviation competitions with other organizations across the United States. Annually, it awards a scholarship key to the outstanding member of each chapter. The fraternity also awarded scholarships for aviation students.

As of 2023, Alpha Eta Rho has more than 50,000 alumni. Its alumni work in all facets of the aviation industry and related management fields, including airline captains, military aviation flag officers, corporate CEOs, NASA engineers, flight attendants, aircraft mechanics, aviation museum directors, aerospace engineers, and pilots.

Alpha Eta Rho is incorporated in the state of Missouri. Its quarterly newsletter is The Beam.

== Symbols ==
The Greek letters Alpha Eta Rho stand spell the Greek word "aer" or "air". The letter Alpha also means "first and foremost". The letter Eta represents the fraternity's seven founders because it is the seventh letter in the Greek alphabet. As the last letter in the word air, Rho stands for density and solar distance, symbolizing the strong bonds of the fraternity's members despite their travels through the aviation industry.

The Alpha Eta Rho badge is shaped like a five-cylinder radial airplane engine with a diagonal propeller on top. The Greek letters Α and Η are above the propeller, with Ρ below the propeller. The heads of the cylinders are decorated with two emeralds and three rubies. Its pledge pin is shaped like a propeller.

The fraternity's colors are chrome yellow, red, and black. Its motto is "Collegiate Aviation Leaders of Today... Aviation Industry Leaders of Tomorrow."

== Governance ==
Alpha Eta Rho is overseen by a national board of directors. In addition, the fraternity has a National Student Executive Committee made up of student members. The day-to-day operations of the fraternity are run by Benjamin O'Brien, the organization's Chief Executive Officer.

== Chapters ==
As of 2023, Alpha Eta Rho has chartered more than 140 chapters across the United States and abroad.

== Notable members ==
- Pretto Bell (Beta) – aviator and second licensed female pilot in the United States
- Kenneth P. Bergquist (Pi Honorary) – brigadier general and Assistant Secretary of the Navy
- John Franklin Bruce Carruthers (Associate) – minister and aviation historian
- Iris Cummings (Alpha) – aviator and swimmer in 1936 Summer Olympics
- Ira C. Eaker (Alpha) – aviation pioneer and aerobatic pilot
- Earle Foxe (Associate) – silent film actor, president, and co-owner of the Black-Foxe Military Institute
- Rudy Frasca (Chi) – pioneer in aviation flight training simulation
- Harold Gatty (Associate) – navigator and record-setting aviation pioneer
- Arthur C. Goebel (Honorary Associate) – aviation pioneer and winner of the Dole Air Race
- George Allan Hancock (Iota) – aviator, banker, railroad engineer, and the namesake of Allan Hancock Field and Allan Hancock College
- Herbert Hoover Jr. (Associate) – engineer, United States Under Secretary of State, and eldest son of President Herbert Hoover
- Joe W. Kelly (Pi Honorary) – U.S. Airforce General and Commander, Military Air Transport Service
- Ronald D. Kelly (Sigma Second) – aviation academic and director of the Southern Illinois University Air Institute and Service
- Rufus B. von KleinSmid (Associate) – president of the University of Southern California and the University of Arizona
- Eugene S. Kropf (Pi) – aviation historian, public affairs officer of the Federal Aviation Administration, and namesake of the Eugene S. Kropf Scholarship
- Frank Kurtz (Alpha) – record-setting aviator and champion high diver at the 1932 Summer Olympics
- Charles Lindbergh (Alpha) – aviator who made the first nonstop flight from New York City to Paris
- Jack Northrop (Lambda) – aircraft industrialist, aircraft designed, and founder of the Northrop Corporation and Northrop Aeronautical Institute
- Jean Piccard (Associate) – chemist, engineer academic, and high-altitude balloonist
- Tyrone Power (Alpha Honorary) – actor
- Elliott Roosevelt (Associate) – brigadier general, general manager of Gilpin Airlines, and the son of President Franklin D. Roosevelt and Eleanor Roosevelt
- Lee Shippey (Honorary) – journalist and author
- Ernie Smith (Alpha) – professional football player
- Robert E. Stuck (Eta) – United States Army Air Force pilot
- Roscoe Turner (Associate) – record-breaking aviator
- Lee Ya-Ching (Honorary) – actress and pioneering aviator

== See also ==
- Professional fraternities and sororities
