= Mark Mitchell Campbell =

Barnstormer, stuntman, and Lockheed executive (1897-1963)

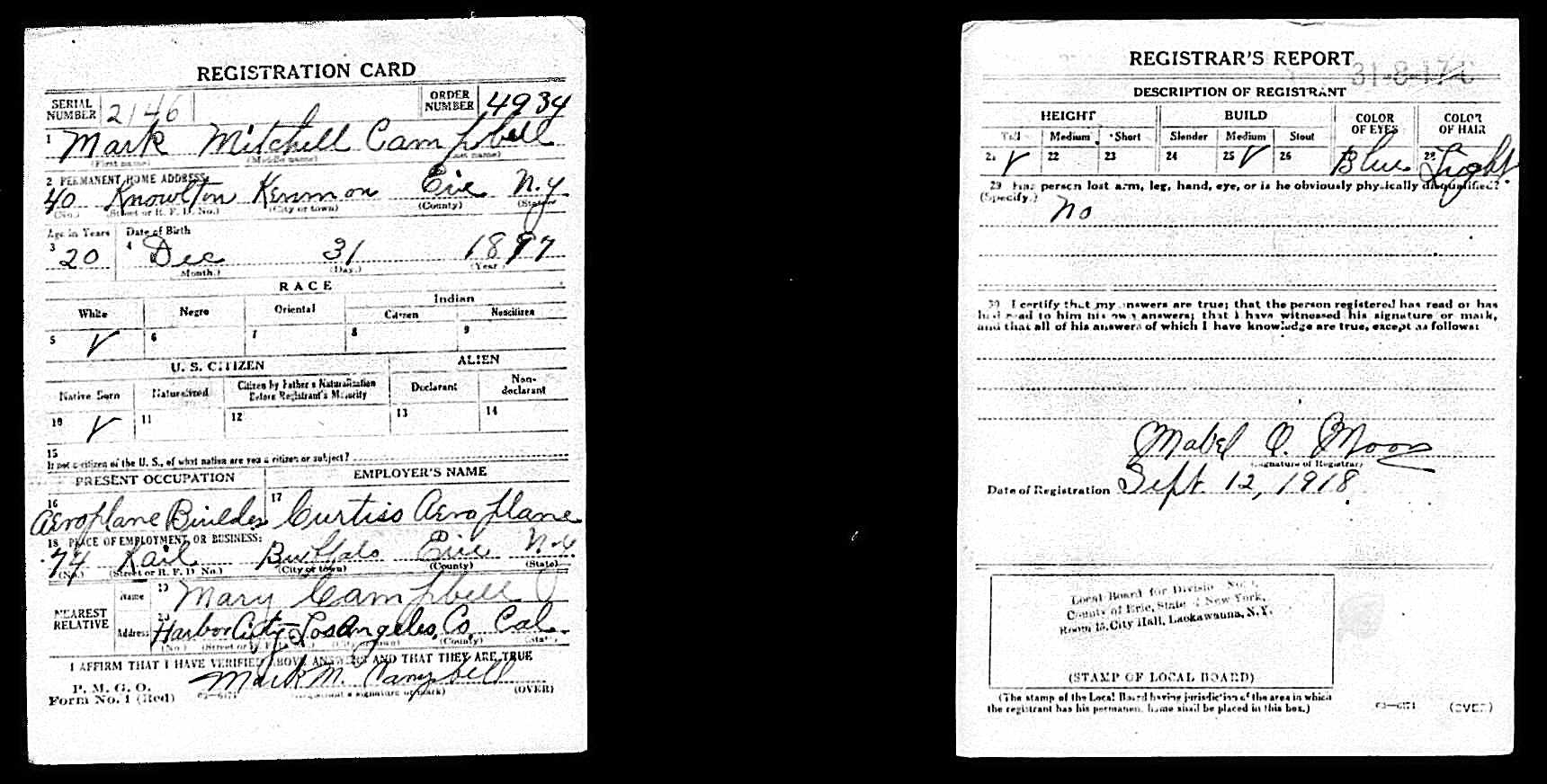
Mark Mitchell Campbell in the World War I draft registration

Mark Mitchell Campbell (December 31, 1897 – June 21, 1963) was a barnstormer, movie stunt man, Lockheed executive from 1934 to 1960. He was the co-founder of the Silver Wings Fraternity in California.

== Biography ==
He was born on December 31, 1897.

For Evelyn Trout, a prototype of the Bone Gold Eagle, serial number C-801, was designed by R.O. Bone and Campbell.

He died on June 21, 1963. Campbell was buried in the Portal of Folded Wings Shrine to Aviation.
