= Walter Brookins =

Walter Richard Brookins
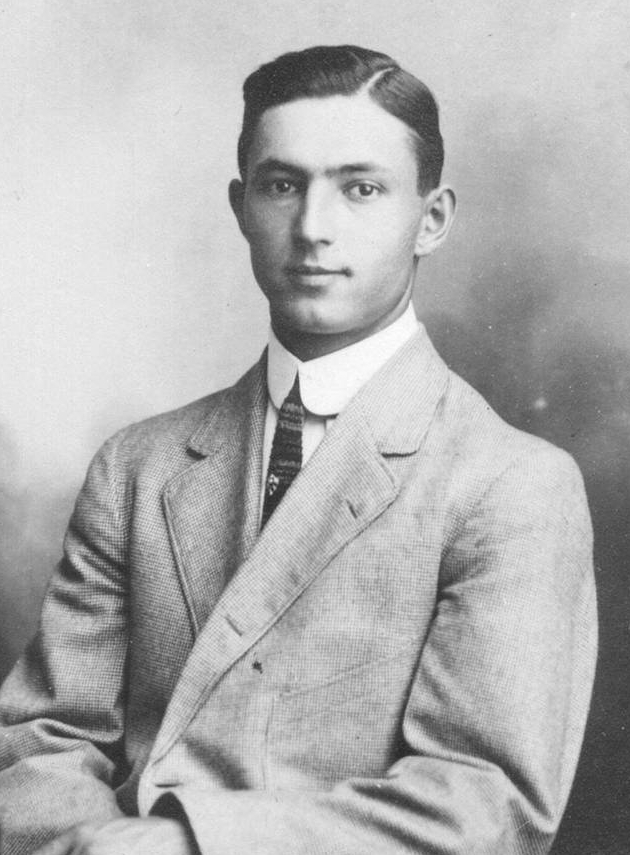
- Brookins in 1910
- Born: July 11, 1889; Dayton, Ohio, U.S.
- Died: April 29, 1953 (aged 63); Los Angeles, California, U.S.
- Resting place: Portal of Folded Wings
- Known for: Wright brothers
- Parent(s): Noah Holsapple Brookins (1858–1936); Clara Belle Spitler (1873–1947)
- Relatives: Alpharetta 1881/1971 Orville 1893/1954 Earl 1898/1992

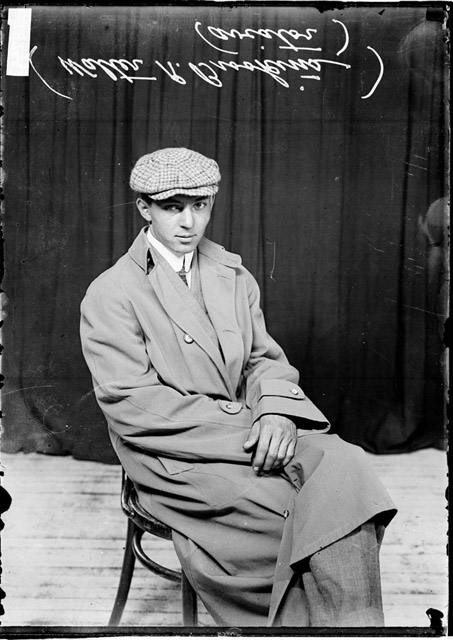
Walter Richard Brookins (1888–1953) in 1910

Walter Richard Brookins (July 11, 1889 – April 29, 1953), was an early aviator trained by the Wright brothers.

== Biography ==
Brookins was born in July 1889 in Dayton, Ohio to Clara Belle Spitler (1873–1947) and Noah Holsapple Brookins (1858–1936). He had three siblings: Alpharetta Brookins (1891–1971) who married Walter P. Hoffman; Noah Orville Brookins (1893–1954); Earl Brookins (1898–1992). Walter married Mary Lamke.

Walter was taught at school by Katharine Wright, sister of the Wright brothers, and that led to his interest in flying. His first solo flight was after just two and a half hours of demonstration. He became the Wrights' first instructor for the Wright Exhibition Team.

Walter Brookin's a former newspaper boy, turned race car driver described himself as a "tinkerer", to The Evansville Press, he said he inherited the knack for automobile engineering from his father, Noah Brookins an auto engineer. Walter closely followed the auto industry as it developed and was one of the first people in Dayton, Ohio to own an automobile. Walter was racing automobiles on the Pacific coast in 1908, and 1909, according to the article [The Evansville Press, 10, 11, 1910] when he asked his father, to get in touch with the Wright brothers in Dayton and see about flying one of their airships competitively. The Wright brothers agreed with some reservations of the daredevil nature of the racing and Walter Brookins became the Wright brothers first employee.

He came into prominence at an Indianapolis meet, on June 14, 1910, where he made a new world's record for altitude of 1,335 m (4,380 ft).

June 28, 1910, Montreal, Que., - "The aviation meet was delayed by a heavy wind until 5:30 this evening. Walter Brookins, of the Wright team, started before the heavy wind had gone down, remaining up nine minutes, 50 seconds. In a second ascent he mounted to an altitude of approximately 4,000 feet and was in the air twenty minutes and thirty seconds. Count DeLesseps made two exhibition ascensions. On his second flight he ascended higher than he has yet done in Canada and in both descended in his usual graceful way. Lachappelle, a member of the Wright team, made good time in speed circles, doing the first lap in two minutes, two seconds. Frank Coffyn, another Wright man, and Walter Brookins, went for a trip together, stayed up for fifteen minutes, twenty-five seconds. This was the first double ascent of the meet."

June 30. 1910, Montreal, Que.,- "Walter Brookins in a Wright machine, accompanied by Bertrand De Lesseps, brother of the count, made a flight lasting twenty-three and one-half minutes and rose to a height of 1,140 feet at the aviation meet here today."

July 2. Montreal, Que., - "The holiday crowd of 20,000 people which attended the aviation meet at Lakeside today saw eleven flights. One made by Walter Brookins, in his Wright biplane, lasted forty-five minutes. He attained an officially certified height of 3,150 feet. Ralph Johnstone, one of the Wright aviators, smashed his machine beyond repair while making a landing."

He later set world records for altitude, transcontinental flight and endurance.

On July 10, 1910, at Atlantic City in New Jersey, he flew to an altitude of 1,882 m (6,175 ft) in his Wright biplane, becoming the first person to fly at an altitude of one mile. He pioneered corkscrews and other stunt flying.

On 29 September 1910, Brookins piloted the first flight from Chicago, Illinois, to Springfield, Illinois. He flew in a Wright Model B. For this flight the Wright Brother's team was awarded $10,000.

On 29 October 1910, Brookins flew the new Wright Baby Grand, a clipped-wing, V8-powered flyer to compete in the Gordon Bennett Trophy competition at Belmont, New York. In front of the grandstand during the official timing, the aircraft lost half its cylinders and crashed, tossing Brookins out and leaving him with bruised ribs.

On December 20, 1910, Brookins performed his "spiral dip" at Dominguez Field, Los Angeles. He climbed to 500 feet powered by the Wright four-cylinder engine, then spiraled down whirling in a circle about 10 feet in diameter. He did three variations of the feat "... making turns which seemed impossible." To further astonishment the crowd, he did a series of dives at the ground, pulling up then diving.

October 2, 1911 - Brookins established a world's record...in carrying 5,000 pieces of mail by "Aerial Post" from Kinloch Aviation Field to Fairground, a distance of twelve miles, in ten minutes and fifteen seconds.

"Among the maneuvers in which pilot Brookins specialized were the vertical bank and the dead-stick landing. His studies and experiments in relation to both these maneuvers contributed greatly to the flying art of that day. Brookins is known to be fearless while in the air and great feats are expected of him when he gets ahold of an improved air craft..."

He died in 1953 in Los Angeles his ashes were the first to be enshrined at Valhalla Memorial Park Cemetery in North Hollywood, California.
