= Warren S. Eaton =

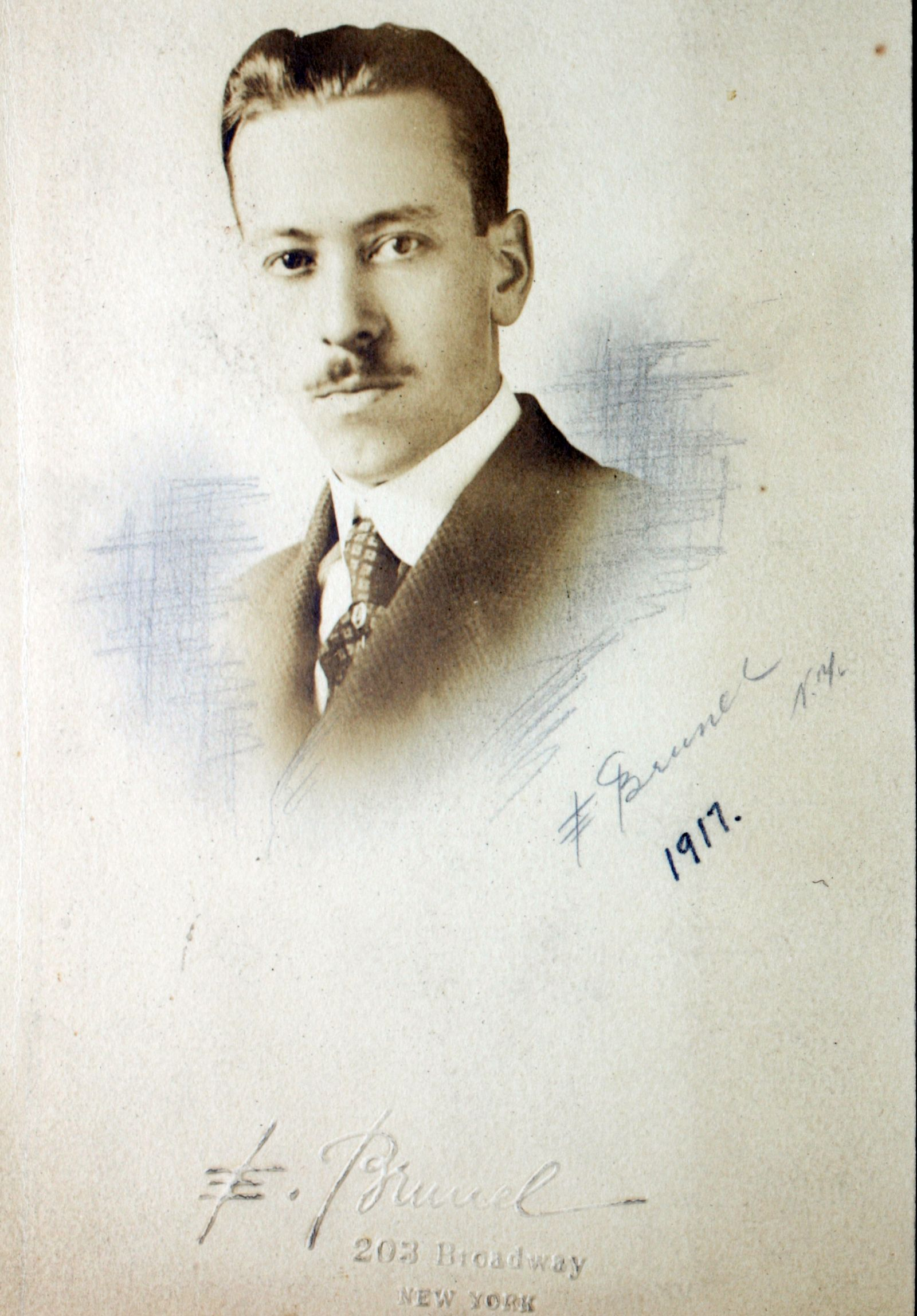
- Warren S. Eaton
- Born: June 12, 1891; South Dakota
- Died: June 22, 1966 (aged 75); Los Angeles, California
- Occupation: Aviator
- Military career
- Burial place: Portal of the Folded Wings Shrine to Aviation
- Allegiance: United States of America
- Branch: United States Army Air Forces
- Service years: 1939-1946
- Rank: Lieutenant Colonel

Warren Samuel Eaton (June 12, 1891 – June 22, 1966) was a pioneer aviator.

== Biography ==
He was born on June 12, 1891, in South Dakota and moved to Los Angeles, California, with his parents. He died on June 22, 1966, and was buried in the Portal of Folded Wings Shrine to Aviation.
