= Timeline of Moffett Airfield =

Airport dedicated for naval air wings and reconnaissance

In the nation's quest to provide security along its lengthy coastlines, air reconnaissance was put forth by the futuristic Rear Admiral William A. Moffett. Through his efforts, two Naval Air Stations, including Airbase Sunnyvale CAL, were commissioned in the early 1930s to port the Naval Airships (dirigibles) which he believed capable of meeting this challenge.

== 1910s ==
=== 1914–1918 ===
WWI: the Germans demonstrate Zeppelin Airships as weapons of war

== 1920s ==
=== 1921 ===
The first large US airship hangar is built at Lakehurst, New Jersey

=== 1923 ===
September, USS Shenandoah is launched and flown from Lakehurst

=== 1924 ===
25 November, USS Los Angeles built by the Zeppelin Company in Germany is delivered to the US Navy in Lakehurst

=== 1925 ===
September 3, the USS Shenandoah encounters a squall line in Ohio and crashes.

=== 1926 ===
June 24 (Washington, DC), The Navy department authorizes construction of two large dirigibles, named USS Akron and USS Macon, to be the nucleus of the modern Air Force.

The Navy begins searching for a west coast base for these airships.

=== 1927 ===
The Beginning of Airships in the Bay Area, Beginning of Airbase Sunnyvale CAL.

Looking at 1,700 acres of broccoli, cauliflower and hay fields, Laura Thane Whipple, a local real estate agent, then selling a ranch in Sunnyvale, recalled reading of the need for a 'metropolitan area' dirigible base on the west coast. The photos she took the first day she saw the ranch would become a panorama that she sent in a pitch to the Navy.

Whipple alerted representatives of the Bay Area Chambers of Commerce and state politicians who began the campaign for a base. Competition was heated, particularly with the city of San Diego which offered Camp Kearny for $1. Santa Clara, San Mateo, San Francisco, and Alameda counties collaborated to raise $470,000 ($6.2 million in 2012 dollars) to buy 1,000 acres of the Rancho Ynigo, believed to be the last intact land grant in California.

The negotiation to purchase the 1,000 acres of the Rancho Ynigo, a 1844 Mexican Government land grant to an Ohlone Native American Lupe Ynigo, begins, involving eight different landowners.

- Hirsch Land Company
- Henry Wong Him of San Francisco
- The South Shore Port holdings
- Minnie and Antone Medeiros
- The Holthouse family
- Merrill Lion who leased to the Fosgate-Lion Seed company

=== 1929 ===
July 30, The San Jose Chamber of Commerce acquired a 1,000 acres (4.0 km^{2}) parcel of the Yñigo Ranch bordering San Francisco Bay, paid for with nearly $480,000 raised by the citizens of Santa Clara County, then "sold" the parcel for $1 to the US government as a home base for the Navy airship USS Macon. The location proved to be ideal for an airport, since the area is often clear while other parts of the San Francisco Bay are covered in fog. This is due to the Coast Range to the west which blocks the cold oceanic air which is the cause of San Francisco fog.

The base was originally named Airbase Sunnyvale CAL as it was thought that calling it Mountain View would cause officials to fear airships colliding with mountainsides.

== 1930s ==
=== 1931 ===
February 12 (Washington, DC), NAS Sunnyvale was the Pacific Coast location selected. Congressional Bill Accepts 1,000 acres and signed by President Herbert Hoover. The land was sold to the government for $1, in order to match San Diego's deal. The new base would bring much needed jobs and income to Northern California.

The hangar was designed and developed to port the USS Macon (ZRS-5). The immense structure, Hangar One, designed to house this dirigible, remains the second largest structures in the United States without internal support. The Goodyear Airdock in Akron, Ohio, where the USS Macon was built, is the largest.

==== 1931–1935 The USS Macon years ====
May (Akron, Ohio), USS Macon commenced being built

July 8, Construction of Hangar One begins. Its construction preceded the other buildings located on the base which date from 1933. Hangar One is a true landmark: a colossal structure marking the land and skyline of Silicon Valley. It is 1,133 feet long, 308 feet wide, and 198 feet high. By comparison, aircraft hangars in the early 1930s were about thirty to fifty feet high and seldom exceeded 200 feet in plan dimension.

=== 1932 ===
USS Akron visits Sunnyvale

=== 1933 ===
Construction begins on the remainder of Moffett Air Base. From an architectural and engineering standpoint, the oldest and most historically significant buildings at NAS Moffett, include Hangar One and the formal cluster of buildings that lead up to it (and also the later-built blimp Hangars Two and Three). This area, is named the Shenandoah Plaza after the USS Shenandoah is bounded by Bushnell Street, the parking behind Sayre Avenue, and Westcoat and Clark Roads. The central area is laid out in an axial plan with the major buildings symmetrically placed along a grand central greensward. There are also significant historic officers' residences clustered around Berry Drive to the south of the main gated entrance in another formally layout with grass medians, a grass island at the end of the southern cul-de-sac and a characteristically suburban curved residential street. Another residential complex was originally planned for the northern side of the entrance drive in keeping with the symmetry of the plan but was never built.

These earliest buildings were designed and built by the Navy Department Bureau of Yards and Docks. They exemplify California's and the Government's most popular contemporary architectural style of the 1920s and early 1930s, that of the late Spanish Colonial Revival architectural style.

March 11 (Akron, Ohio), USS Macon christened by Jeannette Whitton Moffett

April 4, (Atlantic Ocean), USS Akron crashes, 74 lives lost, including Rear Admiral Moffett, then Chief of the Navy's Bureau of Aeronautics.

April 12, The airbase “NAS Sunnyvale” and Hangar One were dedicated and commissioned and go into service.

April 21 (Akron, Ohio), USS Macon's first official flight

May 18, After the death of Rear Admiral William A. Moffett, who is credited with the creation of the airfield, and in recognition of the significant contribution to naval history by Rear Admiral Moffett, contributions that have gained him the unofficial title, "Father of Naval Aviation", in the loss of the USS Akron, the airfield is renamed NAS Moffett Field

June 23 (Akron, Ohio), US Macon is commissioned

July 6, Macon receives her first aircraft on board

October 12 (Lakehurst, New Jersey), USS Macon departs the east coast for its new home base at NAS Moffett Field

October 15, The USS Macon completed its maiden voyage across the United States to Sunnyvale, arriving with much fanfare after a 70-hour flight.

=== 1934 ===
April, USS Macon flies east To Florida

Mid July, USS Macon surprises President Roosevelt on board ship, coming back from a trip to Hawaii.

=== 1935 ===
February 12, USS Macon shares the same fate as the USS Akron, crashing into the ocean off of Point Sur, California. Only two people were killed

February 26 (Washington, DC), The US Navy cancels its large rigid airship program, since USS Shenandoah, USS Akron and USS Macon were all plagued by crashes, and the large airship era ends.

July, Five naval aircraft squadrons start operating from NAS Moffett Field on a trial basis.

After the crashing of the USS Macon, the Navy wanted to close NAS Moffett Field due to its high cost of operations.

In San Diego, the Army and Navy were having jurisdictional issues over North Island in San Diego harbor, which had both NAS San Diego as well as the Army's Rockwell Field dividing the island. The Navy wanted the Army out of North Island in San Diego harbor as it needed to expand NAS San Diego as a training airfield for its growing number of aircraft carrier pilots. The Army resisted strongly, as Rockwell Field was a major training airfield for flight cadets, and had been using the field for flight training since 1912.

A proposal surfaces for the Navy to trade NAS Moffett Field to the Army in exchange for Rockwell Field, California; Bolling Field, Washington, D.C.; and Ford Island, Hawaii.

==== 1935–1943 Army Air Corps Training Base Sunnyvale, CA ====
October, With the subtle assistance of President Franklin Roosevelt, a former assistant secretary of the Navy, a complex arrangement of facilities realignment was made by the War Department which transferred Moffett to Army jurisdiction and Rockwell Field was transferred to the Navy, becoming NAS North Island. The Army definitely felt shortchanged by the President, considering him an "old Navy man" as Roosevelt had served as Assistant Secretary of the Navy from 1913 to 1920.

September, The Army took over NAS Moffett Field in September 1935, and immediately became disenchanted with it, mainly due to the high cost of Hangar One's maintenance, and wanted to inactivate the facility.

President Roosevelt would not allow the closure of the facility, and the Army assigned Moffett to its Western Flying Training Command as headquarters for pilot and aircrew flight training west of the Rocky Mountains. The base became the home for the United States Army Air Forces 82nd Army Observation squadron and the 9th Air Base Material squadron.

Among the pilots earning his wings at the base was 2nd Lt. Jimmy Stewart, who later became a well-known actor.

=== 1939 ===
Also in 1939, Moffett saw the establishment of the Ames Aeronautical Laboratory.

== 1940s thru 1950s ==
=== 1941 ===
7 December, The Japanese attack Pearl Harbor

As an aftermath of the Japanese attack on Pearl Harbor, the Navy wanted to use the airship hangars at Moffett for blimp operations along with Pacific Coast. However, the Army, still stinging about having to transfer Rockwell Field to the Navy, resisted strongly. Again the inter-service rivalry was overruled by the War Department, citing the Navy's need for coastal defense a priority and ordered the Army to move its training headquarters to Hamilton Field in Marin County, north of San Francisco.

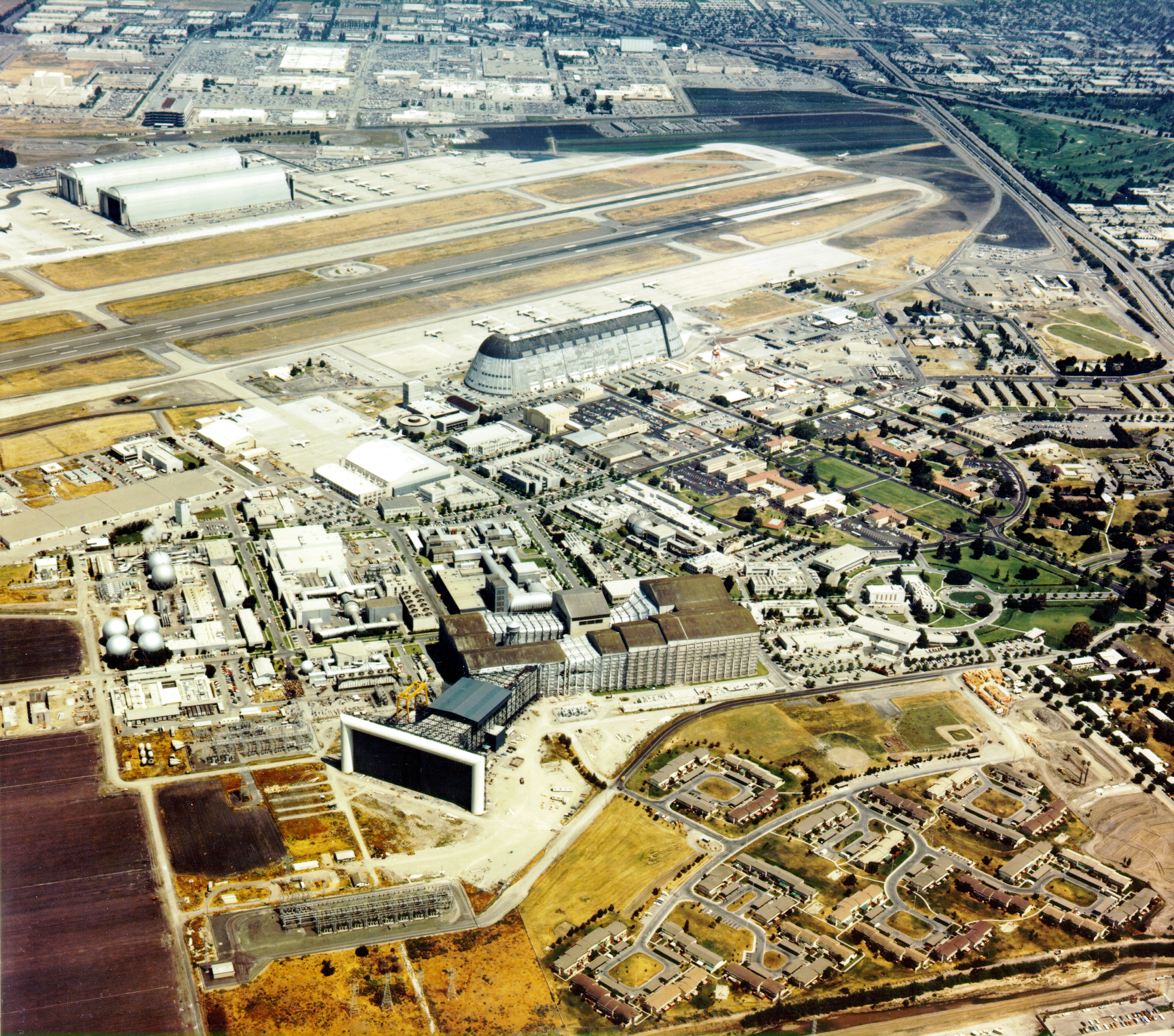
Aerial View of NAS Moffett Field and NASA Ames Research Center.

=== 1943 ===
February, The last Army aircraft departs as the headquarters of the Western Flying Training Command moved to Santa Ana Army Airfield.

=== 1942 ===
April 16, Control of the facility was returned to the Navy and it was recommissioned as NAS Sunnyvale. Four days later it was again renamed NAS Moffett Field.

From the end of World War II until its closure, NAS Moffett Field saw the development and use of several generations of land-based anti-submarine warfare and maritime patrol aircraft, including the Lockheed P2V Neptune and Lockheed P-3 Orion. Until the demise of the USSR and for some time thereafter, daily anti-submarine, maritime reconnaissance, Fleet support, and various training sorties flew out from NAS Moffett Field to patrol along the Pacific coastline, while Moffett's other squadrons and aircraft periodically deployed to other Pacific, Indian Ocean and Persian Gulf bases for periods of up to six months.

==== 1942–1947 WWII blimps and gas balloon operations ====
The significance of the historic district is attributed to the association with the expanding defense capabilities of the Navy, the engineering technology found in lighter than airships, the design of the hangar and system for porting the dirigible and in the layout and architectural style of the station designed to support this defense technology.

After Pearl Harbor in 1941, the Navy desperately needed NAS Moffett Field back to start West Coast blimp operations. While the Army resisted the transfer, Washington D.C. persisted and ordered the Army to vacate the base.

January, The Navy commissioned the ZP-32 squadron at NAS Moffett Field, initially without any blimps.

February, Deflated blimps, in storage at Lakehurst, were shipped by rail to NAS Moffett Field. These were TC-class blimps (TC-13 and TC-14), that had been given to the Navy when the Army abandoned its LTA program in 1937.

ZP-32 patrol unit was forms from two TC-class blimps and two L-class blimps, based at NAS Moffett Field.

April 16, Upon reassuming the airfield, the Navy recommissions it NAS Moffett Field

October, The first cadets arrived for blimp flight training. NAS Moffett Field conducted primary training to relieve the load on NAS Lakehurst.

During the war prospective blimp pilots were recruited directly from pre-flight schools, some were former LTA enlisted personnel. Navy blimp pilots were not cross trained and qualified to fly an airplane. Blimp training was a short four months (later extended to six months) and may have motivated some cadets to volunteer for LTA vs HTA training. Initially training at NAS Moffett Field, cadets worked as ground crewmen to learn blimp-handling procedures. A few flights in hydrogen-filled free balloons followed, and then the cadets trained in L-class blimps (blimps). After completing their primary training, the cadets traveled to NAS Lakehurst for advanced training in the K-class blimps.

NAS Moffett Field was the center for West Coast LTA operations and headquarters for the Commander, Fleet Airship Wing Three was formed at NAS Moffett Field to provide support for Squadron ZP-32.

October 31, Goodyear then began a program to ship new deflated blimps from Akron, Ohio to NAS Moffett Field for final assembly and inflation. The first airship completed by this program, K-20, was placed in service by the Navy.

==== 1942–1943 Hangars 2 & 3 Built ====
November, Construction began on Hangars Two and Three. These hangars were designed to accommodate the smaller blimps and balloons used for reconnaissance, until the range of heavier than air aircraft (airplanes) was sufficient to patrol the coast. Late in 1942, two additional west coast LTA stations were also commissioned at NAS Santa Ana, California and NAS Tillamook, Oregon.

=== 1943 ===
Hangars Two and Three were completed. These timber-frame structures were constructed to serve the blimp surveillance program. They were two of seventeen built from standardized plans by the Navy Department Bureau of Yards and Docks with Arsham Amirikian acting as principal engineer.

The new Hangars Two and Three are 1,075 ft. long, 297 ft. wide and 171 ft. high, an extruded parabolic form that reflects the profile of the airship vessels accommodated within. A total of fifty-one Douglas Fir heavy-timber trusses rest on concrete bent frames that contain two-story shop and office areas. Two concrete and wood post and lintel structures support multi-track rolling doors, 121 ft. tall, at either end. These hangars have a monumental presence set within a paved expanse of airfield, and are a familiar landmark in the San Francisco Bay Area.

Goodyear's assembly program at NAS Moffett Field ended after delivering thirty-nine (39) G-class blimps, L-class blimps, and K-class blimps.

As many as twenty blimps at a time were on duty at the base during the war years. NAS Moffett Field had an excellent record of ship and mine detection. However, as jet airplanes were developed and began to take over the functions of the blimps, the lighter-than-air (LTA) program went into decline.

=== 1944 ===
The Navy begins to scale down on LTA operations especially on the West Coast where Japanese submarines had never become a serious threat.

March, Primary blimp flight training ends and, NAS Moffett Field is designated a joint LTA/HTA station

=== 1945 ===
June, The first M-class blimp, the largest blimp in Naval service, arrives.

=== 1945 ===
14 & 15 August, End of World War II in Asia occurs, when armed forces of Japan surrendered to the forces of the Allied Powers

=== 1947 ===
August, The last military blimp at NAS Moffett Field is deflated. The NAS Moffett Field era of lighter-than-air ships was over.

=== 1943 ===
June, VJ-18 was commissioned and began training with VJ-14.

July, VPB squadrons of PV-1 Venturas with Patrol Service Unit 8, Detachment 2, arrived as VJ-14 transferred out. At the end of 1944, four VPB squadrons with a total of fifty-three PVs plus two utility squadrons, VJ-1 with a mixed bag of aircraft and VJ-18 with nine Martin JM tow planes were on board.

August 6, NAS Moffett Field opens two small Naval Auxiliary Airfields (NAAF) at Watsonville and Eureka, California to provide more patrol coverage of the Pacific coast, north and south of NAS Moffett Field. Limited HTA operations began at NAS Moffett Field in December by utility squadron VJ-14.

=== 1945 ===
VPB squadrons receive the new PV-2 Harpoons. The Antisubmarine Warfare Training Unit NAS Moffett Field was formed with thirteen (13) aircraft including ten (10) OS2U Kingfishers.

The Navy decided to move VR-4 to NAS Moffett Field from NAS Alameda and a $2.5 million contract began to strengthen the taxiways. NAS Moffett Field had a 7000-ft. runway that was part of a 1.14 million sq. yd. asphalt mat with eight mooring circles. Barracks existed for 290 officers and 2,500 enlisted men. The base employed almost 1000 civilians, mostly in the Assembly and Repair Department.

June, The Army transfers the former interceptor field at Half Moon Bay to NAS Moffett Field for an Outlying Landing Field (OLF).

=== 1950 ===
During the Korean War in 1950, NAS Moffett Field housed the first night jet fighter in the Navy. More support buildings and landing facilities were built during this time period.

=== 1945 ===
NAS Moffett Field provided training to transport and patrol squadrons. In subsequent war years, the base transitioned to become a major Naval Air Transport Service (NATS) Squadron Center.

Following the war, NAS Moffett Field became the West Coast center for NATS and later for the Navy contribution to MATS (still later MAC)

=== 1967 ===
VR-7 was decommissioned, ending Navy participation in the Military Airlift Command (MAC).

=== 1953 ===
The Navy bases two carrier squadrons at NAS Moffett Field and designates the station the Navy's first Master Jet Base.

Urban growth doomed jet operations at NAS Moffett Field and in the late 1950s, the jet squadrons began moving to NAS Miramar, although the Douglas AD Skyraiders remained until 1963.

== 1960s ==
=== 1960 ===
==== 1960–2010 US Air Force's Blue Cube ====
The nearby Air Force Satellite Test Center (STC), was created adjacent to (on the SW corner of) NAS Moffett Field. Often referred to as "the Blue Cube," it was operational until 2010 as Onizuka Air Force Station, now part of the Air Force Satellite Control Network (AFSCN).

=== 1963 ===
January, NAS Moffett Field was chosen as the West Coast and first center for the new Lockheed P-3 Orion. NAS Moffett Field returned to its original mission of long-range reconnaissance and anti-submarine patrols. These planes would become a common sight at NAS Moffett Field for the next thirty (30) years.

== 1970s ==
The base would become the headquarters of the Commander, Patrol Wings, U.S. Pacific Fleet, responsible for patrolling 93 million square miles of the Pacific Ocean from Alaska to Hawaii.

=== 1973 ===
April 12, A U.S. Navy Lockheed P-3C (157332) operating from NAS Moffett Field in Sunnyvale, California collided with a Convair CV-990 (N711NA) operated by NASA during approach to runway 32L. The aircraft crashed on the Sunnyvale Municipal Golf Course, half a mile short of the runway, resulting in the destruction of both aircraft and the deaths of all aboard except for one Navy crewman. (Note: One Navy crewman in the P-3 did survive the crash. He was in the P-3's tail section, which broke off the aircraft as the 990 collided from above. He fell out of the broken tail section and survived with massive injuries. People at the golf course who witnessed the crash tried to break open windows on the wreckage with golf clubs in a futile attempt to pull the injured out before fire consumed the crews.)

After a station reorganization, the mission of NAS Moffett Field was to support anti-submarine warfare training and patrol squadrons. During this mission, only unit-level and intermediate-level aircraft maintenance was performed.

== 1980s ==
=== 1986 ===
August during the NAS Moffett Field Airshow, the Italian demonstration team, Frecce Tricolori, and the German Navy's F-104 flight demonstration team, the Vikings, performed in front of the crowd.

== 1990s ==
=== 1992 ===
The base is designated for closure under the Department of Defense Base Realignment and Closure (BRAC) program.

==== 1992–1994 NAS Moffett Field Transfers to NASA ====
At its peak in the 1990s, NAS Moffett Field was the U.S. Navy's principal Pacific Fleet base for the P-3C operations. In addition to headquarters staffs for Commander, U.S. Patrol Wings Pacific Fleet (COMPATWINGSPAC); Commander, Patrol Wing TEN (COMPATWING 10); and Commander, Reserve Patrol Wing Pacific / Patrol Wing FOUR (COMRESPATWINGPAC/COMPATWING 4), the air station also hosted Patrol Squadron THIRTY-ONE (VP-31)...the west coast P-3C Fleet Replacement Squadron, six (6) additional active duty P-3C squadrons and a Naval Air Reserve P-3C squadron in addition to NASA and California Air National Guard aviation activities.

Post-Cold War defense cutbacks and related Base Realignment and Closure (BRAC) actions in the 1990s identified NAS Moffett Field for closure.

The west coast Fleet Replacement Squadron, Patrol Squadron 31 (VP-31), was deactivated and its functions combined with its east coast counterpart, Patrol Squadron 30 (VP-30) at NAS Jacksonville, Florida. Several active duty P-3C squadrons, the Naval Air Reserve P-3C squadron and COMRESPATWINGPAC/COMPATWING 4 were also deactivated, while COMPATWINGSPAC and COMPATWING 10 (redesignated COMPATRECONWING 10) transferred to NAS Whidbey Island, Washington while the remaining patrol squadrons transferred to NAS Whidbey Island, Washington or NAS Barbers Point, Hawaii (until its closure in 1999), at which time the Barbers Point squadrons moved to Marine Corps Air Facility Kaneohe Bay, Hawaii.

The Lockheed P-3C active duty assets were moved to NAS Whidbey Island. At its height, P-3 operations totaled nine squadrons with seven operational, one training, and one reserve.

=== 1994 ===
July 1, NAS Moffett Field was closed as a naval air station and turned over to the NASA Ames Research Center. NASA Ames now operates the facility as Moffett Federal Airfield. Since being decommissioned as a primary military installation, part of Moffett has been made accessible to the public, including a cordoned portion of the interior of the massive Hangar One. There were once balloon rides given on show days, and incidents of weather inside.

NAS Moffett Field closes as a military base. Its name changes to Moffett Federal Airfield.

Moffett Federal Airfield Transfers to NASA Ames Research Center NASA, owner of the adjacent Ames Research Center, assumed control of the NAS Moffett Field facility. Supervision of NAS Moffett Field's two runways, three aircraft hangars, and 3.5 million square feet of facilities was turned over to the NASA Ames Research Center. As the new federal custodian, NASA Ames operates the shared facility in the heart of "Silicon Valley" at the southern end of San Francisco Bay and serves as host to a number of other federal, civilian, and military resident agencies.

The immediate issues were how to use the newly acquired land in a manner consistent with NASA's mission, and how to pay for the maintenance and operations of such a large site. These matters were originally addressed in the Moffett Federal Airfield Comprehensive Use Plan (CUP) and its associated Environmental Assessment (EA), which, in 1994, resulted in a Finding of No Significant Impact (FONSI).

=== 1995 ===
The city of San Jose passes a resolution stating that if the federal government decided to discontinue its operation of Moffett Federal Airfield, the airfield should become a civil airport for the long-term benefit of Santa Clara County.

After transfer of the property to NASA local Mountain View and Sunnyvale community leaders formed a Community Action Committee (CAC) to recommend uses at Moffett Federal Airfield.

=== 1997 ===
June, The CAC completed six months of comprehensive public deliberations on the future of Moffett Federal Airfield and a thorough review of practical alternatives for retaining NASA Ames Research Center as the operator of the federal facilities there.

October, The Sunnyvale City Council agreed in principle to participate with the City of Mountain View and NASA to explore the development of a major air and space center located at Moffett Federal Airfield and Ames similar to those established in Washington, D.C., Huntsville Alabama, and Cape Canaveral, Florida.

The Civil Reserve program would have allowed the federal government to use cargo planes in case of an emergency in exchange for allowing commercial use of military bases or other non military facilities approved by Congress.

November 25, Air cargo at NAS Moffett Field, under the federal Civil Reserve Air Fleet program, is unacceptable to the City of Sunnyvale, according to the decision made by Sunnyvale City Council meeting. The council's decision was based on the report and recommendations of the Sunnyvale / Mountain View Joint Community Advisory Committee (CAC) on Moffett Federal Airfield after a series of extensive public hearings on issues related to the future of Moffett Federal Airfield and NASA Ames Research Center. Residents' primary concerns have included noise levels of the proposed air cargo planes.

== 2000s ==
=== 2003 ===
The structure of Hangar One was identified as a source toxic chemicals leaking into the sediment in wetlands bordering San Francisco Bay.

PCBs The polychlorinated biphenyls (PCBs), used in the roof, were the primary cause of the roof needing to be removed.

Asbestos & Lead While Asbestos & Lead exist in the insulation materials and paint, these were considered contributory pollutants and not the primary reason to remove the skin; however, once the removal action of the skin was decided as the course of action these materials (primarily within the interior) were exposed and had to be remediated as well as the roof.

=== 2006 ===
An offer to clean Hangar One and coat its outsides with solar panels to recoup the costs of cleaning was floated by a private company, but the plan never saw fruition because it was too costly and the orientation of the hangar for solar collection was less than ideal. Executive Summary: http://www.nuqu.org/20060505/185/

May 23, The Initial EE/CA (Engineering Evaluation/ Cost Analysis) for Hangar One (Site 29) was released recommending Hangar One's demolition. The initial EC/CA findings were presented at a meeting of the Former Naval Station Moffett Federal Airfield Restoration Advisory Board (RAB). Subsequently, the decision was made to revise the Hangar One EE/CA document based on community comments and new information.

=== 2007 ===
May 9, Fabric Cover Proposed At a RAB meeting, community member and architect Linda Ellis presented architectural fabric as an alternative to be included in the revised Hangar One EE/CA. The response was that the Navy had not looked at siding alternatives. Scott Gromko, Navy Remedial Project Manager, offered to discuss supplying copies of the record drawings and existing documents for Ellis' study of this subject.

=== 2008 ===
August The Navy proposed stripping the toxic skin from the hangar and leaving the skeleton, protecting it with epoxy. The Navy claimed that to reclad the structure would cost another $15 million and that this is NASA's responsibility. This was regarded as a partial victory by campaigners.

August 17, Public Testimony to the Navy

September 17, NASA indicates that it was still urging the Navy to restore Hangar One, but that it was willing to help save the structure; in particular, NASA was in favor of re-covering the structure at the same time as it was stripped.

Public Testimony to the Advisory Council on Historic Preservation (ACHP)

=== 2009 ===
January, The Revised EE/CA released in 2008, and the subsequent Decision Document (the Action Memorandum) is finally signed off by the BRAC Environmental Coordinator, Former Naval Station Moffett Federal Airfield.

== 2010s ==
NASA finds a developer for a 77-acre, $1 billion NASA Research Park (NRP). Still in its planning phases, the NRP would replace many old Navy buildings with new research facilities, offices, housing and a campus for a consortium of universities led by UC Santa Cruz.

=== 2011 ===
April, The Hangar One exterior panels began being removed, starting with the top mansard panels. Work continued on the south-end doors over the summer of 2011, and then moved on to the south-end east and west sides of the hangar during the fall of 2011.

=== 2012 ===
December, Hangar One control is returned to NASA while the Navy continues its work on mitigating the underground hazardous waste plume.

==== Today ====
A New Beginning for the Moffett Federal Airfield

Moffett Federal Airfield has occasional air traffic, with an average of 5-10 flights landing per day.

The airfield is regularly used by the California Air National Guard, Army, NASA, Lockheed Martin Space Systems (commercial satellite manufacturer), the Google founders for their private planes, the Santa Clara County Sheriff's Department for their helicopter STAR 1, and Air Force One during presidential visits to the Bay Area

== USS Macon Wreck Discovered ==
=== 1991 ===
February, The Monterey Bay Aquarium Research Institute (MBARI) succeeded in locating and surveying the debris field of the USS Macon and was able to recover artifacts. As well as artifact recovery, the survey included collecting sonar, video, and still camera data.

=== 2005 ===
May, MBARI returned to the USS Macon’s wreck site as part of a year-long research project to identify archeological resources in the Monterey Bay. Side-scan sonar was used to survey the site.

=== 2006 ===
September, Subsequent Expedition to the USS Macon’s Wreck Site A more complete return, including exploration with remotely operated vehicles and involving researchers from MBARI and the National Oceanic and Atmospheric Administration's Office of National Marine Sanctuaries.

=== 2010 ===
January 29, U.S.S. Macon Airship Remains added to the National Register of Historic Places (NRHP). The archaeological remains of the USS Macon lie off California's Big Sur coast in NOAA's Monterey Bay National Marine Sanctuary. The site also contains the remains of four of the airship's squadron of small Curtiss F9C Sparrowhawk scout aircraft which the USS Macon carried in an internal hangar bay. The wreck site remains secret, and is within a marine sanctuary, the Monterey Bay National Marine Sanctuary, and is not accessible to divers due to depth (1,500 ft; 460 m).

The site is also a U.S. Navy grave site.

== 1965–2008 historic honors ==
=== 1965 ===
December 8, Hangar One is nominated as a US Navy Historic Site.

==== 1966 ====
Jan 3, Hangar One is designated as a Naval Historical Monument by the Navy Chief of Naval Operations.

Hangar One is listed in the Santa Clara County Heritage Resource Inventory.

=== 1977 ===
October, Hangar One is designated as Historic American Engineering Record CA-335, State of California Historic Civil Engineering Landmarks by the San Francisco section, American Society of Civil Engineers.

=== 1994 ===
Feb 24, The Shenandoah Plaza National Historic District is accepted into the National Register of Historic Places.

- Criterion A, association with coastal defense and naval technology that has made a significant contribution to the broad pattern of our history
- Criterion C, distinctive type, period, method of construction and high artistic values found in the 1933 hangar

Hangar One is significant for its contribution to expanding coastal defense capabilities of the U.S. Navy and airship technology during the country's peacetime era between 1932 and 1941. Hangar One has been determined singly eligible for an individual National Historic Building listing in the National Register of Historic Places if so desired.

The Department of Interior and National Park Service attribute the same significance to National Historic Sites and the buildings therein, and to National Historic Buildings. The difference in the designation is simply that a site is a collection of items of historic significance versus a single building.

The entire historic district is listed in the National Register of Historic Places at the national level of significance under Criterion A for the association with coastal defense and naval technology that has made a significant contribution to the broad patterns of our history; and Criterion C reflecting the distinctive type, period, method of construction and high artistic values that are represented in the 1933 station plan and buildings.

=== 2008 ===
May 20, Hangar One was listed as one of the 11 most endangered historic places in the U.S. by the National Trust for Historic Preservation. The trust also listed Hangar One on their list of America's Most Endangered Places.
