= Hillbrook =

Hillbrook may refer to:

- Hillbrook, Washington, D.C.
- Hillbrook School, Los Gatos, Santa Clara, California
- Hillbrook Anglican School, Brisbane, Australia

== See also ==
- Brook Hill, Pennsylvania
