= Moir Building =

Historic building in California, United States

- U.S. National Register of Historic Places
- St. James Hotel
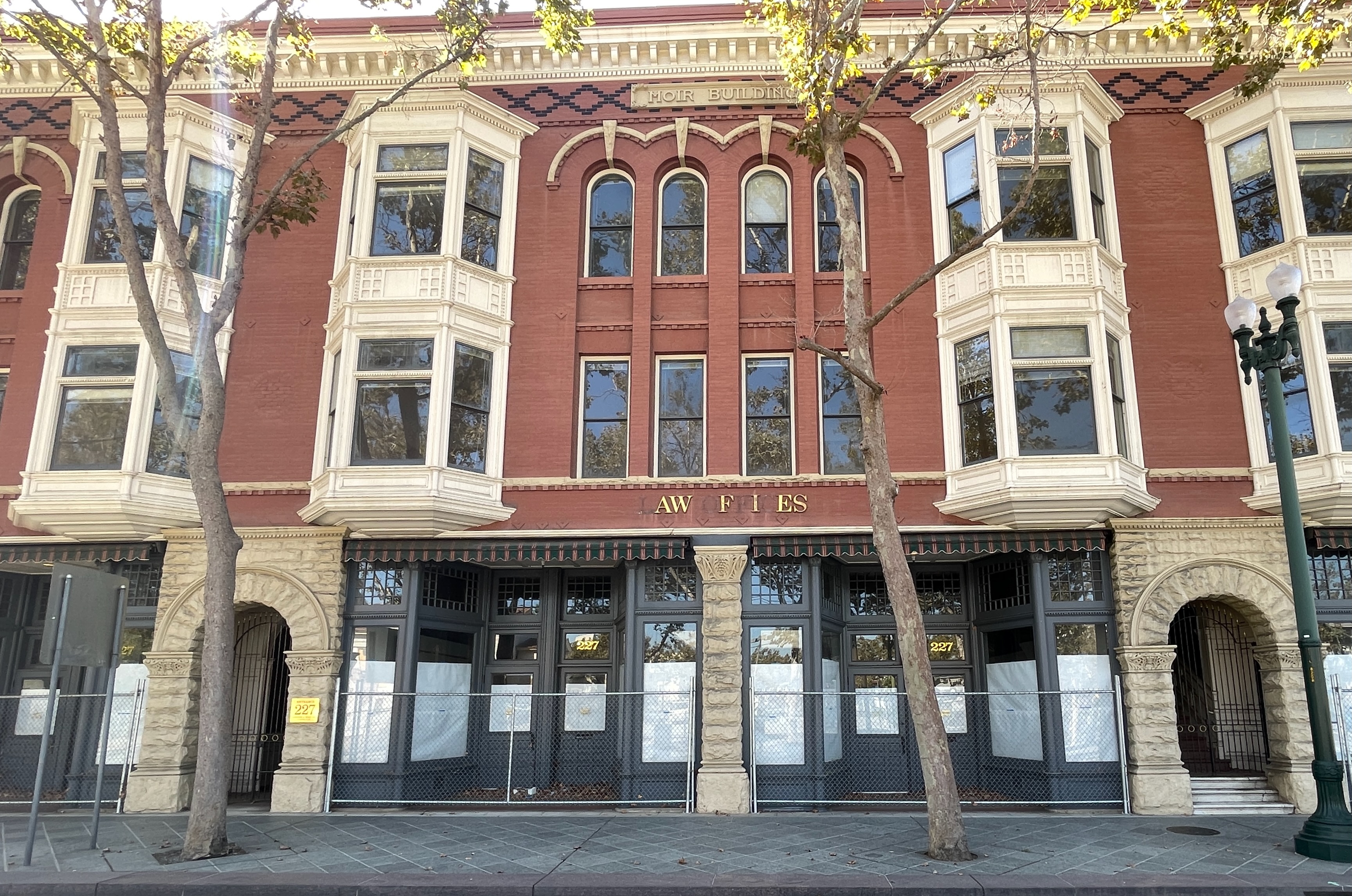
- Moir Building streetfront view

- Location within San Jose, California
- Location: 227 N. 1st Street, San Jose, California, US
- Coordinates: 37°20′23″N 121°53′36″W
- Area: 0.5 acres (0.20 ha)
- Built: 1893–1894
- Architectural style: Queen Anne and Romanesque Revival
- NRHP reference No.: 82000991
- Added to NRHP: October 29, 1982

The Moir Building, was formerly the Straford Hotel, and then in the 1930s named the St. James Hotel. It is a historic building located in downtown San Jose, California, next to the St. James Park. The building was placed on the National Register of Historic Places on October 29, 1982.

== History ==
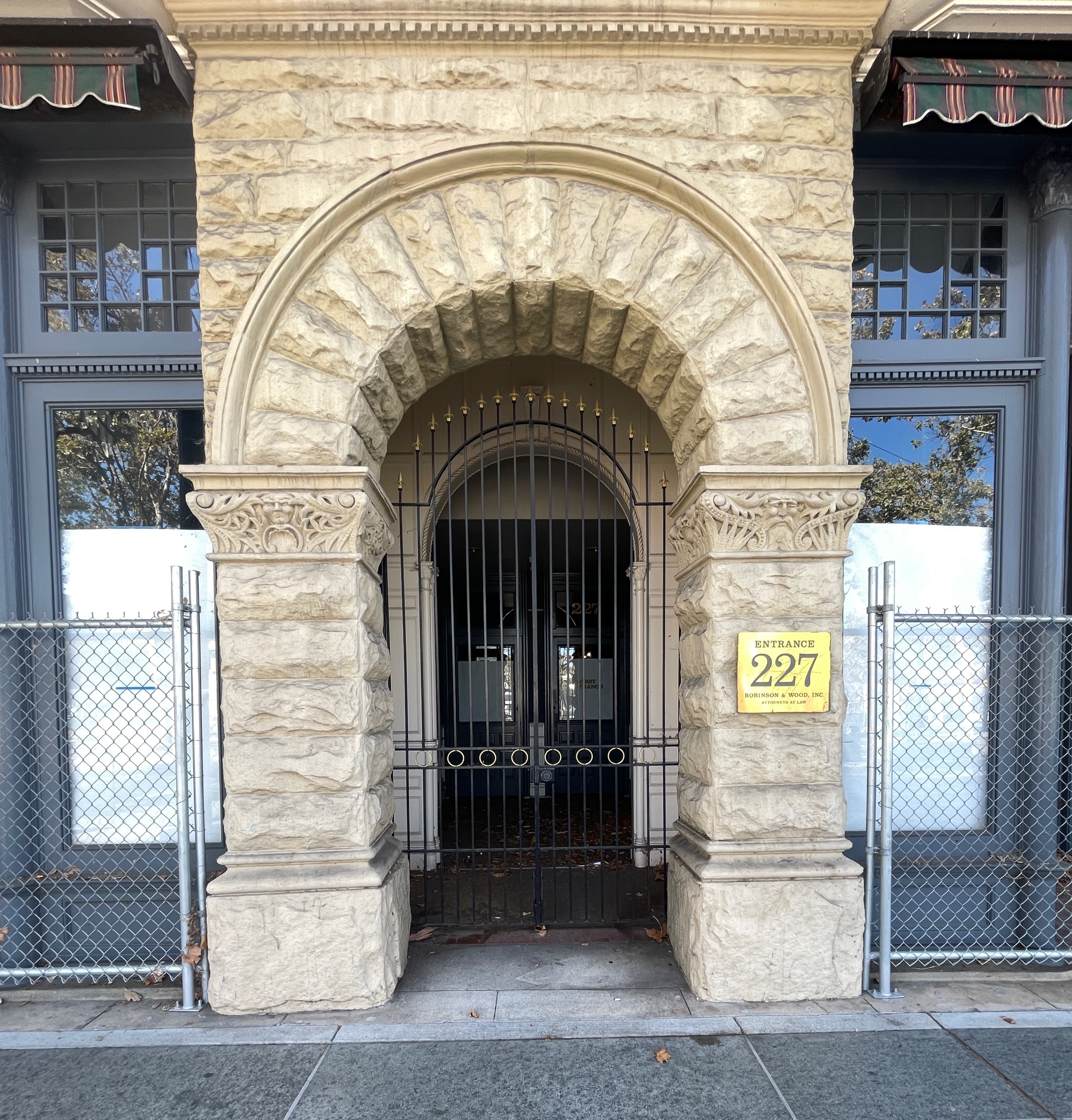
Moir Building at the front Romanesque entrance

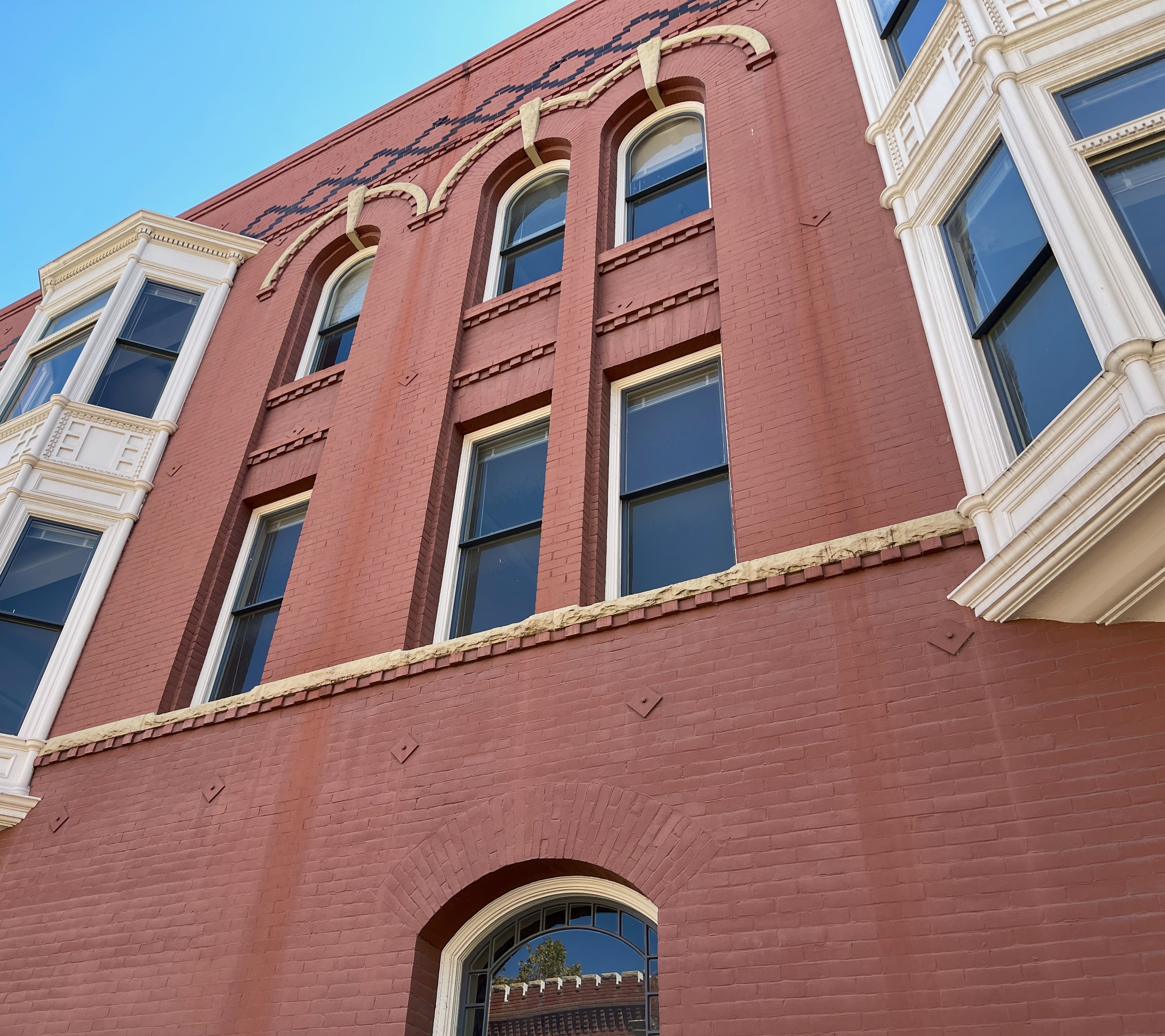
Moir Building three sets of paired windows

Originally known as the Moir Building, located at 241 North 1st Street, this three-story brick structure was constructed by William Moir in 1893–1894 and named after him. Initially, it served as the home of the Straford Hotel. However, the name was later changed when the original St. James Hotel was razed in the 1930s. Since 1927, the Campen family has owned the building. The building was erected on the former California Theater site.

The developer, William Moir, undertook this construction project when he was a young entrepreneur in his early twenties. The building was strategically situated in the commercial district to the north of downtown. Historical records reveal that several tenants who resided in the flats above also operated businesses on the ground floor. Among these tenants was Moir himself, who ran a bicycle shop adjacent to the Santa Clara Valley Board of Trade, precursor to the San Jose Chamber of Commerce. Moir also held the role of director within the Board of Trade.

The 30,000-square-foot (2,800 m^{2}) Moir Building stands as a three-story rectangular structure, crafted from brick and with sandstone, cast iron, and wood. The upper levels of this commercial and residential building are dominated by slanted bay windows and a rounded corner tower. The building's primary facade faces eastward, featuring architectural detailing. Its dimensions are 107 ft (33 m) in length by 76 ft (23 m) in width. The building's designer William D. Van Siclen was active as an architect in San Jose from 1892 until 1900.

The street-level facade is divided into six bays. There are sandstone piers with acanthus capitals situated at the southern end and the central section of the building. Additional divisions are marked by the presence of a sandstone arch, which serves as the entrance to the upper floors. This entrance underwent alterations before 1938. Between these arches and piers, there are four storefronts. Cast-iron columns define the original window layout for all the shops. The Romanesque entrance features three marble steps leading to double French-style doors with panes over panels. The upper-level facade is segmented into seven bays, featuring a rounded tower. Among these bays, four are distinguished by slanted bay windows. On the third floor, there are three sets of paired windows, rounded at the top. Decorative panels, dentils, and archivolt trim with elongated keystones have been incorporated. Above the cornice, a parapet encircles the flat roof and is capped with a string molding. The bracketed cornice, which includes a band of dentils above a plain frieze, serves as an ornamental frame housing the inscription "MOIR BUILDING" at its center.

In 2018, the building went through a $1 million renovation, including a new heating and cooling system, skylights on the third-floor, and new windows in the building.

In 2023, a special-use permit was filed with the city of San Jose (SP22-025) to allow the re-use of the historic landmark building for Hillbrook School, a private school in Los Gatos. The high school with up to 300 students and 45 staff will be located in the Moir Building and the San Jose Armory building which is one block east. The school will lease the buildings for 25 years.

== See also ==
- List of cities and towns in California
- California Historical Landmarks in Santa Clara County
