= Henry Post Army Airfield =

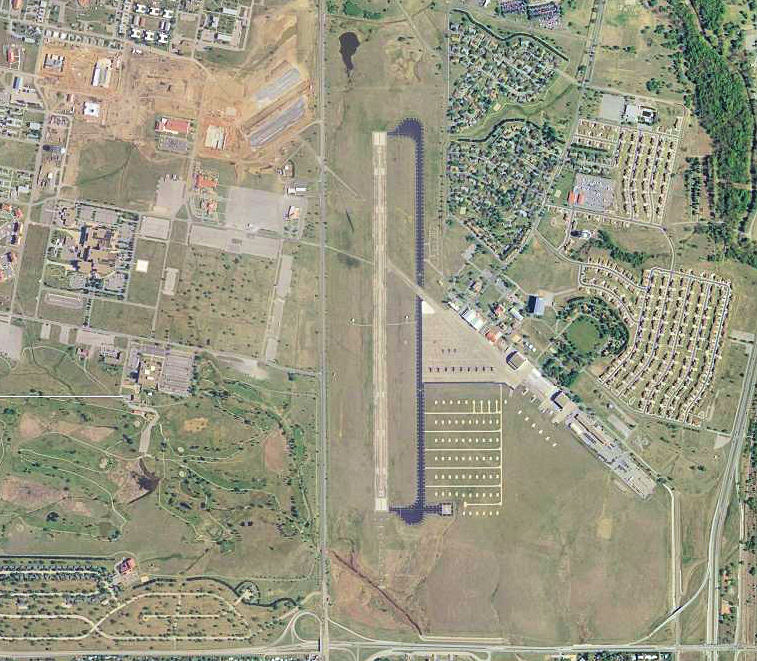
- IATA: FSI; ICAO: KFSI; FAA LID: FSI

Summary
- Airport type: Military
- Owner: U.S. Army ATCA-ASO
- Location: Fort Sill, Oklahoma
- Built: 1917
- Occupants: Air Service, United States Army World War I (1917-1918); United States Army World War II (1942-Present)
- Elevation AMSL: 1,189 ft (362 m)
- Coordinates: 34°38′59″N 098°24′08″W
- Interactive map of Henry Post Army Airfield

Runways
Direction	Length		Surface
Direction	ft	m	Surface
17/35	5,001	1,524	Concrete
- Source: Federal Aviation Administration

Henry Post Army Airfield (IATA: FSI, ICAO: KFSI, FAA LID: FSI) is a military use airport located at Fort Sill in Comanche County, Oklahoma, United States. This military airport is owned by United States Army. Established as Post Field in 1917, it was one of thirty-two Air Service training camps established after the United States entry into World War I in April 1917.

== Overview ==
Henry Post Army Airfield was the first home of all Army Aviation Training after World War II before moving to Fort Rucker, Alabama, in 1954. It is a very historic airfield. There is still a balloon hangar, transported by rail cars from the Naval Air Station Moffett Field airship hangars in California and reassembled at Fort Sill in 1935.

During the On-Site Inspection Agency (OSIA) four phase inspections as authorized by the INF Treaty of 1988, the 20th century Lighter-Than-Air (LTA) hangar was a point of convergence by the Soviet Union prior to Revolutions of 1989 and discontinuation of the Cold War.

== Facilities ==
Henry Post AAF has one runway designated 17/35 with a concrete surface measuring 5,001 by 200 feet (1,524 x 61 m). There are no permanently assigned Army aviation units, and the facilities are operated as a military airport. The primary users of the airfield are USAF training aircraft from Sheppard AFB, Wichita Falls, TX, and Dyess AFB, Abilene, TX.

== History ==
The field was named in honor of pioneer aviator 2d Lieutenant Henry Post (1885–1914). Post was assigned to the 25th Infantry, and reported for aeronautical duty at the Signal Corps Aviation School, Rockwell Field, San Diego, California on 26 May 1913. On 18 December, Post set an altitude record for Air Service aviation, attaining a height of 10,500 feet. On 9 February 1914, while at Rockwell Field, he was killed in an airplane crash, after reaching an altitude of 12,140 feet. While descending, the Wright Model C, Signal Corps 10, suffered the collapse of a wing and the airframe dropped into San Diego Bay. Following this accident, the Signal Corps condemned all pusher types, essentially removing Wright brothers designs from further service.

=== Origins ===
The first Army aviation at Fort Sill began on 26 July 1915 when eight Curtiss JN-3 airplanes of the 1st Aero Squadron arrived from Rockwell Field, California. The squadron was ordered to Fort Sill as a result of the Tampico Affair threatened war between the United States and Mexico. However, the aviation facilities at Fort Sill consisted of little more than a grass field. Using Fort Sill as a base of operations, a detachment was flown to Brownsville, Texas in August until a proper airfield was built for the squadron at Fort Sam Houston, near San Antonio. On 26 November, the 1st Aero Squadron departed for Fort Sam Houston, from which it would eventually deploy as part of the 1916 Punitive Expedition against Mexico as a result of Pancho Villa's raid on Columbus, Texas in March 1916.

=== World War I ===
As a result of the United States' entry into World War I, Fort Sill was selected for a primary pilot school. Construction of some 50 buildings began to support the school. Post Field was established as an Airfield on 10 September 1917. The field covered over 700 acres and could accommodate up to 1,000 personnel. Dozens of wooden buildings served as headquarters, maintenance, and officers' quarters.

The Signal Corps had been supplying observation aircraft for the United States Army Field Artillery School since 1915. In the early days of aviation, observation balloons were considered a little more reliable than Airplanes for artillery spotting. Company A 1st Balloon Squadron was assigned to the post on 24 September 1917. but was split up into the 25th, and 26th Balloon Companies. The first aircraft squadron to arrive was the 3d Aero Squadron on 29 August 1917. Although the 3d was equipped with twelve Curtiss R-4 planes, they were replaced with Curtiss JN-4Ds that were shipped in wooden crates by rail car.

Post Field served as a base for flight training for the United States Army Air Service and American observation balloon service in World War I. In 1917, flight training occurred in two phases: primary and advanced. Primary training took eight weeks and consisted of pilots learning basic flight skills under dual and solo instruction with a student capacity of 300. After completion of their primary training, flight cadets were then transferred to another base for advanced training. Training units assigned to Post Field were:

- Post Headquarters, Post Field, September 1917-January 1920

- 3d Aero Squadron, August 1917 (Transferred from Kelly Field, Texas)

Redesignated as Squadron "A", July 1918-January 1919

- 4th Aero Squadron, September 1917 (Transferred from Fort Sam Houston, Texas)

Re-designated as Squadron "B", July 1918-January 1919

- 80th Aero Squadron (II), March 1918 (Transferred from Rich Field, Texas)

Redesignated as Squadron "C", July 1918-January 1919

- 81st Aero Squadron (II), March 1918 (Transferred from Rich Field, Texas)

Redesignated as Squadron "D", July 1918-January 1919

- 202d Aero Squadron (II), April 1918

Redesignated as Squadron "E", July 1918-January 1919

- 251st Aero Squadron, December 1917

Redesignated as Squadron "F", July 1918-January 1919

- Flying School Detachment (Consolidation of Squadrons A-F), January–September 1919

With the sudden end of World War I in November 1918, the future operational status of Post Field was unknown. Cadets in flight training on 11 November 1918 were allowed to complete their training, however no new cadets were assigned to the field. Also, the separate training squadrons were consolidated into a single Flying School detachment, as many of the personnel assigned were being demobilized. Finally, flight training activities ceased in September 1919.

=== Inter-war years ===
With the end of World War I, in October 1919 Post Field was deactivated as an active duty airfield in accordance with sharply reduced military budgets, and a small caretaker unit was assigned to the facility for administrative reasons to support the balloon school/company.

After returning from combat duty in France, a cadre of the 135th Aero Squadron (later 22d Squadron (Observation)) was assigned to Post Field as an observation squadron, supplying aircraft for the United States Army Field Artillery School at Fort Sill and supported Army units at Fort Leavenworth, Kansas. The 135th was moved to Maxwell Field, Alabama in late 1921, and replaced by the re-activated 44th Observation Squadron. The 44th took up the observation mission for the Artillery School until it was moved to March Field, California during June, 1927; being replaced again by the 88th Reconnaissance Squadron until it was moved to Brooks Field in 1931.

Air Service/Corps units assigned to Post Field between 1919 and 1941

- 22d Observation Squadron, 1919–1921
- 44th Observation Squadron, 1922–1927
- 23d Balloon Company, 1919–1922
- 25th Balloon Company, 1920–1921
- 88th Reconnaissance Squadron, 1928–1931
- 15th Observation Squadron, 1940–1941
- 1st Balloon Company (later Squadron), 1929–1941
- 154th Observation Squadron (AR NG), 1940–1941
- 125th Observation Squadron (OK NG), 1941

By the late 1920s, the World War I tarpaper buildings were rotting and turning into fire hazards. Beginning in the early 1930s the Army along with the WPA was able to build permanent buildings the oldest of which, Bldg. 4908 the aircraft maintenance hangar (c.1932), still stands. In 1934 the famous balloon hangar was built to house Dirigibles.

=== World War II ===
In 1940 the Artillery decided that the Air Corps had outgrown such mundane chores as artillery spotting, and it was decided that it would take care of itself with its own observation aircraft, ushering in the era of the now famous grasshoppers, and Bird dogs. The Air Corps then turned over Post Field to the Army, which established the Department of Air Training there. Temporary mobilization buildings, including mainly barracks and troop support buildings like a recreation hall and post exchanges, were built in connection with the school. What was originally a five-week course was soon expanded, and special primary flight schools for prospective Field Artillery pilots were set up at Pittsburg, Kansas, and Denton, Texas. After attending one of these primary schools, pilots went to Post Field for their advanced training, which included short field procedures, and observer training. The United States Army Aviation School was added in 1945 but was transferred to Fort Rucker in 1954. The runway was not paved until after World War II had ended.

=== Today ===
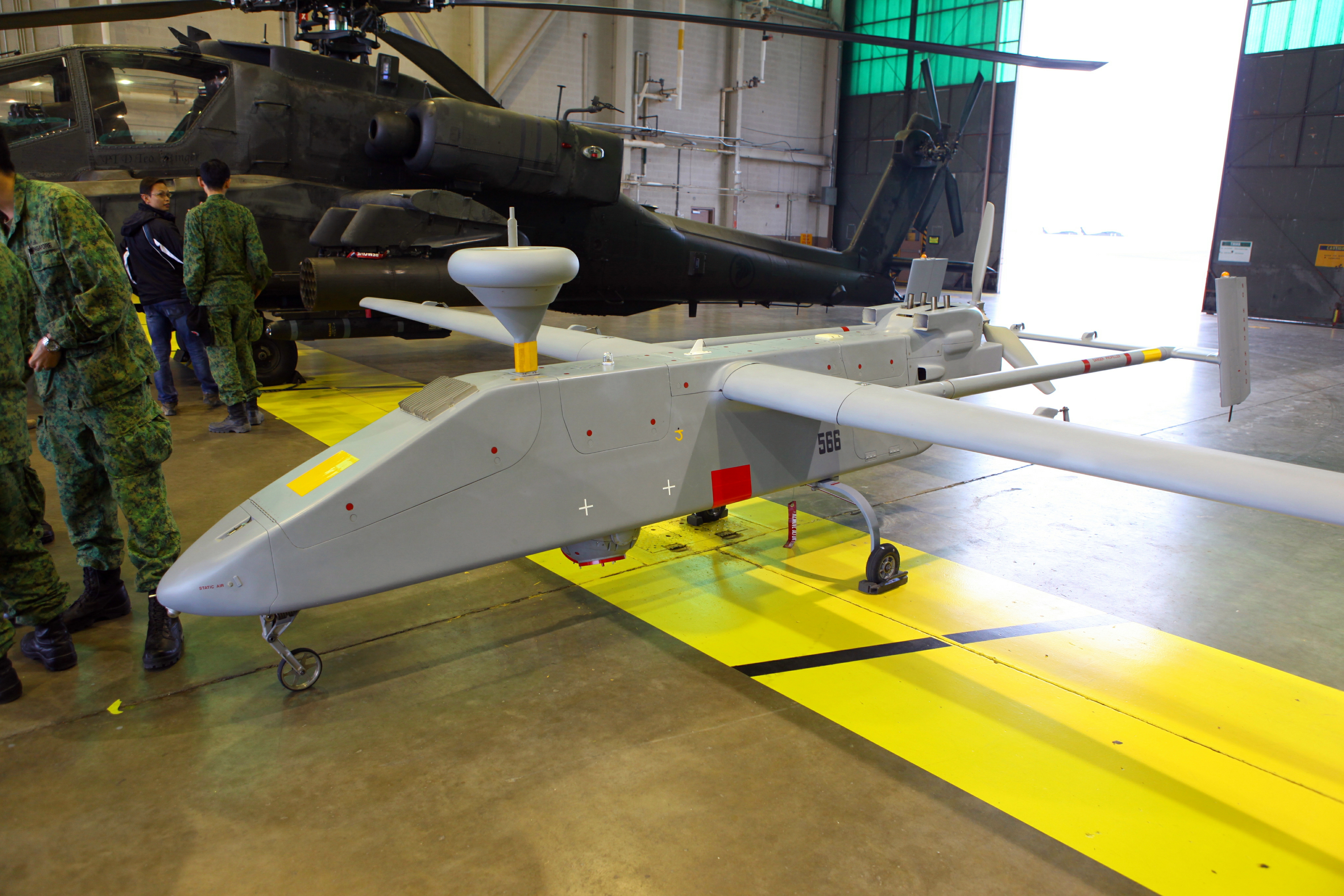
A Republic of Singapore Air Force Unmanned Aerial Vehicle (UAV) sits in a hangar at Henry Post Army Airfield Nov. 14, 2009, at Fort Sill. About 600 Singaporean soldiers and airmen are in Southwest Oklahoma participating in the three-week-long Forging Sabre combined exercise, hosted by Fort Sill, Okla. (U.S. Army photo by Jeff Crawley)

There are no air units currently stationed at the airfield, however air operations for transient units are provided by permanent party personnel.

Fort Sill has embarked on a new plan to support the museum in providing a more dynamic learning experience for the 200,000 military and civilian personnel who visit each year. This ambitious effort involves historic preservation, interpretive exhibits, and a new public facility. Collectively referred to as Project Millennium, projects will be undertaken as resources become available. This includes efforts to continue restoration of the historic buildings to further enhance the National Historic Landmark Area. The initiative will increase the interpretive potential of the 19th century post through living history and other educational programs. Plans include work to assemble and install the army aviation equipment and materials from the museum collections in the balloon hangar at Henry Post Army Airfield to provide interpretation for this little known aspect of Fort Sill history.

The Fort Sill Army Radar Approach Control [ARAC] is the Army's Second busiest Air Traffic Control Facility, providing Radar Approach Control service to Henry Post Army Air Field, Lawton/Fort Sill Regional Airport, Duncan/Haliburton Airport and many smaller airports in the area. In 1999 the Army announced its intention to discontinue operation of the Fort Sill ARAC at Henry Post Army Airfield in Lawton, Oklahoma. Funding was provided by the Congress within the recommended level to continue the operation of the Fort Sill ARAC until such time as a staff study to determine the most cost-effective method of continuing air traffic services is concluded. The Administrator consulted with the House and Senate Committees on Appropriations on alternatives for continuing the necessary air traffic services provided by the Fort Sill ARAC before implementing any modifications to the current operations. Under the agreement, the Army will continue to operate the Fort Sill Army Radar Approach Control (ARAC) until three months after the Air Force installs a new digital radar in the Lawton-Fort Sill area, and a new advanced approach control automation system at Sheppard Air Force Base can provide full display of the data from the new Lawton-Fort Sill radar. The projected operational date is FY 2004.

The Army will continue to operate and maintain a precision approach radar (PAR) at Fort Sill's Henry Post Field for the foreseeable future. Since the Air Force frequently uses this service at Fort Sill, the agreement states the Army will provide the Air Force two years notice if future plans call for the cessation of PAR operations at Fort Sill. The agreement calls for the Army to continue the current level of funding for the operation and maintenance of the Fort Sill ARAC until the Sheppard RAPCON assumes the approach control responsibility. The Army will continue to fund the precision approach radar equipment and manpower necessary to support PAR operations at Henry Post Field.

== Listing as National Register of Historic Places ==
The military balloon aviation hangar was established as a National Register of Historic Places with the National Park Service on November 20, 2015. The military balloon hangar is designated as the home of Fort Sill Museum Aviation Annex.
The old Harrison Aviation Clinic was located adjacent to the aerodrome and is acknowledged as a Historic Landmark.

== Notable personnel assigned ==
- Paul W. Beck
- Kenneth Walker
- Matthew Leander King
- Barksdale Hamlett
- Samuel Reeves Keesler
- Donald Wilson (general)
- Milton Crenchaw

== See also ==
- Oklahoma World War II Army Airfields
- List of United States Army airfields
- Aeronautical Division, U.S. Signal Corps
- List of American Aero Squadrons
- Fort Sill
- List of Training Section Air Service airfields
