= Paul W. Beck =

US Army officer (1876–1922)

Paul Ward Beck
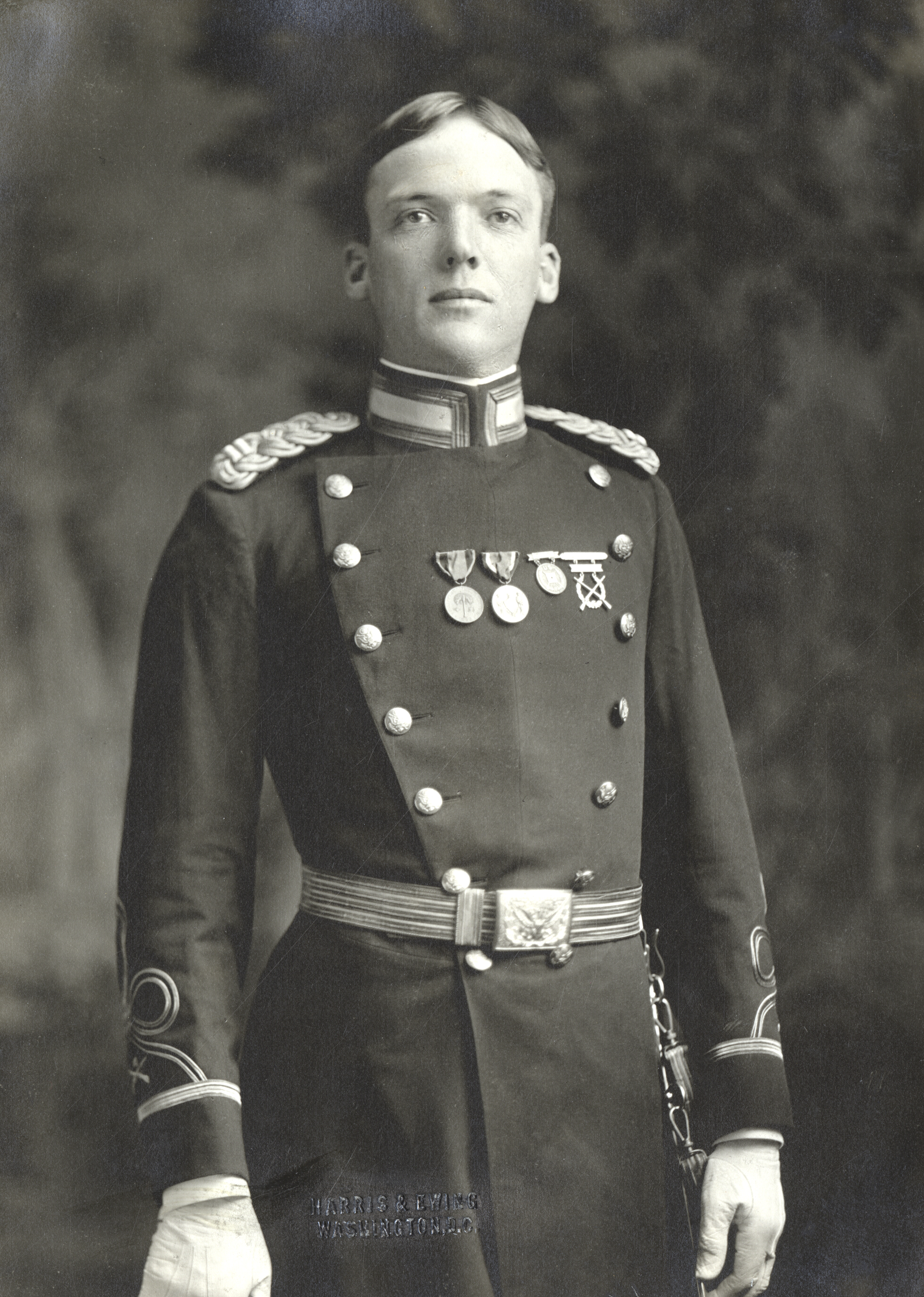
- Born: December 1, 1876; Fort McKavett, Texas, US
- Died: April 4, 1922 (aged 45); Oklahoma City, Oklahoma, US
- Burial place: Arlington National Cemetery
- Military career
- Allegiance: United States
- Branch: Infantry, United States Army Aeronautical Division, Signal Corps Air Service, United States Army
- Service years: 1899–1922
- Rank: Lieutenant colonel
- Commands: Commandant, A.S. Observation School, Henry Post Field, Oklahoma
- Conflicts: Philippine–American War World War I

Paul Ward Beck (1 December 1876 – 4 April 1922) was an officer in the United States Army, an aviation pioneer, and one of the first military pilots. Although a career Infantry officer, Beck twice was part of the first aviation services of the U.S. Army, as de facto head of the flying section of the Aeronautical Division, U.S. Signal Corps in 1911 and as a senior officer of the Air Service in 1920–1922. He is generally credited as being the first military officer to advocate an air force for the United States separate from the control of other branches of the Army.

The son of a cavalry officer, Beck developed an interest in aviation while detached to service with the U.S. Army Signal Corps at Benicia, California, in 1908–1910, attending several air meets. He was one of four students in the first class of U.S. Army and U.S. Navy pilot trainees taught by Glen Curtiss beginning January 1911, and commanded the "provisional aero company" at Fort Sam Houston, Texas. On 1 May 1912, he returned to the Infantry in compliance with an army regulation.

Following service as a field grade infantry officer in World War I, Beck returned to aviation as part of the Air Service in 1920. He was assigned as commandant of the Air Service Observation School and assistant post commander of Post Field at Fort Sill, Oklahoma.

He was killed by a gunshot to the head during an evening with friends. The shooting was a disputed mystery, with friends, colleagues, the county attorney and an Army investigating board suspecting that Beck was murdered for being caught in flagrante delicto with the wife of a friend, possibly with premeditation by an already–suspicious husband. However, the shooter, a well–known former judge on the Oklahoma Supreme Court, contended that the shooting was an accident during an act of self–defense after Beck had allegedly tried to sexually assault the shooter's wife in their home. The judge was exonerated by a coroner's jury.

== Biography and military career ==
Beck was born to 1st Lt. William Henry Beck and Rachel Wyatt Elizabeth Tongate on 1 December 1876 at Fort McKavett, Texas, a frontier outpost of the U.S. Army. His father, a one-time quartermaster sergeant in the 6th Illinois Volunteer Cavalry Regiment during the American Civil War, gained a commission in the Regular Army following the war as a troop officer with the 10th Cavalry Regiment and retired as a brigadier general before his death in 1911.

Beck married Ruth Evelyn Everett of Lyons, Nebraska on 12 January 1896, and they had a son, Paul Ward Beck Jr., born 27 February 1897. Mrs. Beck, an 1893 graduate of the Fremont Normal School in Fremont, Nebraska, (a teacher's college), was at the time a noted author of short stories and works on American Indians. Paul Beck Jr. also became an army officer.

Paul Beck was commissioned a second lieutenant in the 5th Infantry on 1 September 1899. During his service in the Philippines between 1900 and 1902 in the Philippine–American War, Beck served with Company C, 5th Infantry, and was promoted to first lieutenant on 25 March 1902 while stationed at Vigan, Luzon. He engaged in several actions, including a small battle at Parparia, Narvacan, Ilocos Sur, on 15 February 1901 in which he commanded the detachment. He also was responsible for the construction of a road near Vigan, and the building of Camp Gregg at Bayambang, Pangasinan on the central Luzon plain.

He subsequently attended the Infantry and Cavalry School in 1905 and the Army Signal School in 1906. On 4 February 1907 he was commissioned in the Signal Corps and stationed at Benicia Barracks, California. His Signal Corps commission was discharged on 4 February 1911, just after he began instruction in flying in San Diego. On 11 March 1911, now on orders to the Aeronautical Division of the Signal Corps to become an instructor, Beck was promoted to captain, 18th Infantry. (See "Pioneer Aviator" in separate section below for a more detailed account.)

Beck was recalled from his aviation assignment to the Infantry on 1 May 1912 under requirements of the so-called "Manchu Law" (Note: The "Detached Service Law," familiarly known in the Army as the "Manchu Law," was a provision of the Army appropriations act passed by Congress on 24 August 1912 that required a Detached Officers List be kept by the Army to enforce its regulation limiting the amount of time an officer could spend away from the organization in which he was commissioned. Prior to passage of the act, detached service was limited by policy, using a regulation created and enforced by General Order No. 68 (26 May 1911), issued by the War Department in response to criticism of the Army for creating a General Staff in 1903, which many in Congress philosophically opposed in a standing army. The regulation was also intended to curb favoritism shown in embassy and other "soft living" assignments perceived as "homesteading," i.e. "permanent residence" in an assignment. The regulation affected many Army agencies and all aviation officers except those permanently assigned to the Signal Corps. It varied in wording from year to year but all variations stressed that at least one-third of an officer's time in service be spent with a "troop unit." Regulations in succeeding years tended to be more complex and legalistic as challenges to the policy grew in the officer ranks, and after 1914, included all officers in the grade of colonel or lower. The regulation required an officer to serve troop duty in his "arm of the service" (branch) for at least two years in any six-year period. Leave, illness, and travel time did not count towards the two required years. The Manchu Law was rigorously enforced by the General Staff and was much hated by the field forces. It was suspended during World War I and repealed by the National Defense Act of 1920. The term arose in usage comparing staff officers sent back to their regiments to bureaucrats of the Manchu dynasty ousted by revolution in China at the same time. In Beck's case, the applicable regulation was Article VI 'Details', Paragraph 40, Regulations for the army of the United States, 1910.) and assigned to the 17th Infantry at Fort McPherson, Georgia, with temporary duty on the Mexican border at Eagle Pass, Texas. Eighteen months later, on 1 October 1914, he transferred to the Far East as a company commander with the 15th Infantry. (Note: The 15th Infantry had its 1st and 3rd Battalions stationed in China and its 2nd Battalion in the Philippines. It seems likely Beck was with the 2nd Battalion since that was routinely an accompanied tour (dependents permitted) and he obtained his lieutenant colonelcy in the new 31st Infantry, which was raised and organized in the Philippines.) After the United States entered World War I, Beck received temporary promotions to major and to lieutenant colonel on 5 August 1917, the latter with the 31st Infantry. On 28 August 1917 Beck received permanent establishment promotion to major, Infantry.

Beck transferred to Camp Fremont, California, and on 9 April 1918 became the lieutenant colonel of the 12th Infantry, training for combat in Europe as part of the 8th Division. On 5 October 1918 Beck accepted his highest career rank, that of colonel (temporary, Infantry), to become military attaché at the U.S. embassy in Havana, Cuba, 1918–1920. On 20 April 1920 the temporary commission to colonel was honorably discharged and Beck reverted to his permanent grade of major.

Beck's permanent promotion to lieutenant colonel, Infantry, came on 1 July 1920, the effective date of the National Defense Act of 1920 (also known as the Army Reorganization Act), which also made the Air Service a combatant arm of the line, thus enabling him to transfer directly into it. Beck was assigned to Air Service duty on 9 August and took additional pilot training at Carlstrom Field, Florida between 30 September 1920 and 31 March 1921 to re-qualify for his Airplane Pilot rating. He became commandant of the Air Service Observation School and assistant post commander at Henry Post Field, Fort Sill, Oklahoma, on 11 June 1921, and on 25 November officially transferred in grade to the Air Service, with a date of rank of 1 July 1920, making him fourth in Air Service seniority. (Note: Beck was junior only to Billy Mitchell, Col. Chalmers G. Hall, and Col. Theodore A. Baldwin, Jr. Hall was an 1897 graduate of West Point, a cavalryman, and organizer of the four "motor mechanics" regiments of the Air Service after being recalled to active duty from a disability retirement in 1917. He also commanded the 4th Regiment Air Service Mechanics, as they were finally designated. He obtained an airship rating in 1922. Baldwin was an infantry officer who first became a balloonist in 1907 and during World War I commanded the Air Service airfield at Orly, France. He received a balloon observer rating in 1921. Both found themselves marginalized by the airplane-dominated Air Service but did retire as members of the Air Corps.)

== Pioneer aviator ==
After completing the Signal Corps School in 1906, Beck was detached on 2 February 1907 for commissioning and service in that branch with assignment to duty at the Benicia Barracks in California. Between 10 and 20 January 1910, he was assigned to observe the 1910 Los Angeles International Air Meet at Dominguez Field in California for the army. On January 14, 1911, Glenn Curtiss made an unsuccessful attempt to take Lt. Beck on a bombing demonstration during this event. The plan was for Beck to drop a bag of ammunition from an altitude of 250 ft (76 m) into a measured space to show that it was possible to use an airplane to drop bombs into gun pits during a time of war. Engine trouble precluded a successful demonstration that day, however. On 19 January he went up in a Farman III biplane flown by renowned French aviator Louis Paulhan to drop two-pound sandbags in a demonstration of the feasibility of aerial bombing. Using an improvised bombsight of Beck's design, they made three drops from 250 feet (76 m) at 40 mph (64 km/h). The drops were highly inaccurate because the bombsight was adjusted for a much higher speed, but the concept was shown to be sound.

On 29 November 1910 two second lieutenants, George E. M. Kelly of the 30th Infantry at the Presidio of San Francisco and John C. Walker Jr. of the 8th Infantry at Fort Ord, received orders to attend the Curtiss Flying School expected to open in January 1911 on North Island at San Diego, to learn to fly and train to become instructors. At the same time the commanding general of the Western Division assigned Beck to organize and act as secretary for the International Air Meet taking place at Selfridge Field on the grounds of the Tanforan Racetrack in San Francisco, where Kelly and Walker also participated.

Kelly's 30th Infantry provided a battalion to support military applications tested during the meet, building an encampment on the site as a subject for aerial photography, and maneuvering to avoid detection by aerial reconnaissance. On 15 January an officer in the Coast Artillery Corps, 2nd Lt. Myron S. Crissy, dropped 36 pounds of small bombs of his own design by hand from a Wright B biplane flown by Philip Parmalee at an altitude of 1,500 feet (460 m). Although Beck later claimed to have assisted him by the development of an improved bombsight, Crissy denied any collaboration between them and did not use a bombsight in his test. The same day Walker took photographs from 1,200 feet (370 m) of the encampment from the air, flown by Walter Brookins. On 21 January Beck was given a written message to send by wireless transmitter to a receiver 40 miles (64 km) away, the first military use of aerial telegraphy. (Note: The message, composed by AP reporter Guy Moysten, stated: "Scotford is not the only birdman on the committee." (Demers)) The next day Kelly and Brookins flew the aerial reconnaissance mission at 2,000 feet (610 m) to find a troop of cavalry and a battery of artillery from the Presidio approaching the 30th Infantry through the San Bruno Hills but were unable to locate them.

Of his experiment, Beck wrote:

The set used was a rough, makeshift affair, weighing thirty-two pounds. It consisted of a small spark-gap and interrupter, an ordinary telegraph-key, a small storage cell and a by-path or shunt to prevent overcharging the cell. All of these were combined in a wooden box which was carried on my lap. For aerial we used one hundred and twenty feet of phosphor-bronze wire, stranded, dependent from the tail of the aeroplane and connected with the sending apparatus by a number sixteen copper insulated wire. For conductive ground we simply connected the other side of the sending apparatus to one of the stay wires of the aeroplane. It took us about ten minutes to fit the outfit to the aeroplane. The wave-length measured by the wave-meter at the receiving station was 575 meters in length. This is rather longer than we had thought it would be.

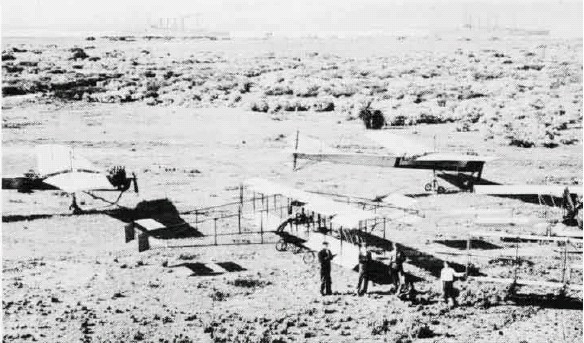
Curtiss Flying School at North Beach California in 1911

After the conclusion of the meet Beck also volunteered for pilot training, and was sent with Kelly and Walker to San Diego. Following a public exhibition of stunt flying on 26 and 27 January by instructors Glenn H. Curtiss, Hugh A. Robinson, and Eugene B. Ely, staged on adjacent Coronado Island by the San Diego Aero Club, the school began its course of instruction on 28 January for the three army officers, Lt. Theodore G. Ellyson of the United States Navy and two civilians. (Note: Cameron places the date of the opening of the school as 21 January, before the San Diego Air Meet. (p. 35)) Preliminary ground instruction taught the mechanical aspects of airplanes and the theory of aerodynamics before the students learned to control an airplane by the tedious "grass cutting method," using a deliberately underpowered training aircraft nicknamed "Lizzy" made of bamboo, spruce, and cloth. (Note: Also known as the "short hop method," this system progressively taught candidates to steer, take off, land, and turn without actually flying. Students operated the airplane alone with an instructor shouting directions from nearby. They first learned to "get the feel for the machine" by attempting to steer a straight line. The foot throttle was tied back to permit only limited speed, gradually increased to 15 mph (24 km/h), and at the end of the runway the student had to stop, get out, turn the plane around by lifting the front end, and return. Once they mastered this, the propellers were changed and the throttle adjusted to permit enough power to take off to a height of 10 feet in a series of short hops. When the student demonstrated an ability to take off and land smoothly, the power was further increased and he learned to make 1/8 and 1/4 turns. (Hennessy 1958, p. 50)) The students advanced to flying the more powerful eight-cylinder Antoinette monoplanes and Curtiss biplanes, usually in the hours just after dawn when conditions were calm. The school ended its first course at the beginning of April and the three officers were sent to Fort Sam Houston, Texas, where the "Maneuver Division" had been assembled as a show of force against Mexican revolutionaries, to continue their training. (Note: The extent of training they received at San Diego is disputed. Kurutz asserts that they "graduated," but Hennessy states that they were ordered to Texas before they completed training (p. 42), and that Kelly was killed "on his primary pilot qualification flight." (p. 45))

In Texas the three joined 1st Lt. Benjamin D. Foulois, who like Beck was dual-commissioned in the Signal Corps, to form a provisional "aero company" created on 5 April 1911 by the chief signal officer of the Maneuver Division in anticipation of training 18 more pilots. Beck was senior to Foulois (Note: Beck was senior to Foulois in rank and all other service aspects (commissioned time, Infantry seniority, Signal Corps seniority) except aviation experience.) and took command of the company, an action that Foulois resented, having been the army's sole aviator since November 1909. Foulois had also trained himself to fly on the army's first airplane, the Wright Military Flyer, which was also a source of friction and rivalry with the Curtiss pilots.

The Army received two new airplanes at Fort Sam Houston on April 20, a Curtiss 1911 "Type IV military aeroplane" (Curtiss Model D) that became Signal Corps No. 2, and a new Wright Model B designated S.C. No. 3. The Curtiss machine was powered by an 8-cylinder, 60 hp (45 kW) engine significantly more powerful than the 40 hp (30 kW) 4-cylinder training engines that the student pilots were accustomed to. When he learned in San Diego that the Army intended to purchase the more powerful single-seater as a trainer, Beck protested that its higher takeoff and landing speeds and greater weight made it too dangerous for novice students, but his recommendation for purchase of the four-cylinder model instead was not taken up until after a fatal accident occurred. After Army acceptance of the aircraft on April 27, two civilian pilots, Frank Trenholm Coffyn of the Wright Company and Eugene Ely from Curtiss, undertook training the small group of pilot candidates on the Curtiss machine.

On 3 May 1911 Beck crashed S.C. No. 2 after its engine failed at 300 feet. Kelly, who had arrived in Texas a week after the others and was behind in his training, took the machine up a week later after its repair and was killed minutes into his qualification flight trying to land. Foulois blamed Beck for improper repairs to the craft, and also questioned his ability to command. However, the investigating board, of which both Foulois and Beck were members, ruled that Kelly's death resulted from landing at too high a speed. In any event, the army shut down all aviation training at Fort Sam Houston and sent personnel and airplanes to College Park, Maryland, where its first aviation school was about to commence. Beck was ordered there as the instructor on the Curtiss machine on 15 June 1911, but Foulois remained on duty with the Maneuver Division until 11 July, when he was reassigned to the Militia Bureau in Washington D.C.

Until that point the army had not set down any regulations or standards for qualifying as a pilot. In July 1911 it adopted the licensing requirements of the Fédération Aéronautique Internationale (F.A.I.), which Beck met on 3 August, earning FAI Certificate No. 39. He immediately began training 2nd Lt. Frank M. Kennedy of the 10th Infantry to be an instructor on the Curtiss machine, with Kennedy's solo qualification coming on 23 October. (Note: Kennedy crashlanded S.C. No 2, the single-seater in which Kelly had been killed, on February 19, 1912. The airplane flipped onto its top, ejecting Kennedy and breaking his back. He recovered but he was out of aeronautics until 1917, when he returned as a balloonist.) After the army published its own pilot qualification standards on 20 April 1912, Beck became the fourth army pilot to be rated a Military Aviator, on 12 July. (Note: Foulois received the fifth rating. Together with 2nd Lt. Henry H. Arnold, 2nd Lt. Thomas D. Milling, and Capt. Charles DeForest Chandler they became the first five rated pilots in Air Force history. (Hennessy, p.229)) He also earned the sixth "Expert" certificate awarded by the American Aero Club.

On November 28, 1911, the aviation school relocated from College Park to Augusta, Georgia, for the winter; Beck's father died two days before the move and he remained in Washington, D.C. until January. When he rejoined the school, he immediately began training in the Wright machines, with 2nd Lt. Henry H. "Hap" Arnold as his instructor. He experienced two accidents flying S.C. No. 6, a second Curtiss machine acquired on July 27, 1911. On February 4, 1912, while taking off from Augusta, wind shear drove the airplane into a tree, shearing off the right wings. After the aircraft was repaired, he took it up on March 2 for a test flight and the engine failed at 300 feet, as had happened in Texas the year before. Attempting to glide back into the field, the bottom of the craft struck a treetop but he landed safely.

During his command of the provisional aero company, Beck came into conflict with superiors in the Signal Corps, which may have been a factor in the Army's decision to invoke the "Manchu Law" on 1 May 1912 and return him to his "arm of service," the Infantry. (Note: Apparently when the regulation was applied, the Army ruled that Beck's Signal Corps duty from February 1907 to February 1911 was "detached service" even though he held a Signal Corps commission and had apparently transferred to that branch. Since the subsequent 15 months of duty with aviation between 4 February 1911 and 1 May 1912 were therefore not "with his ... arm of service," he was ruled in violation of the regulation based on its wording of "when at any time ... within the preceding six years." Consequently Beck was "ordered to join [his] arm of service." However a similar situation with Foulois was handled differently. His commission in the Signal Corps was discharged on 29 April 1912 (two days before the Manchu Law was invoked for Beck), making Infantry once again Foulois' "arm of service" too but he was not "ordered to join said ... arm of service." Foulois remained on detached service with the Militia Bureau for another six months and therefore the Army had officially ruled that Foulois had transferred to the Signal Corps between 1908 and 1912. Were this not the case, he would also have been ineligible for further detached service for a period of two years after the discharge of his Signal Corps commission. Yet in November 1913 Foulois was detached a second time to the aviation service after just a year of infantry troop duty, re-confirming that the Army had officially transferred him to the Signal Corps between 1908 and 1912. This contradictory handling of nearly identical circumstances within the same frame of time suggests that the interpretation of the regulation in Beck's case was for the Army's convenience in squelching him.)

== Independent air arm advocate ==
Beck was a regular if not prolific author of professionally related articles. The editors of Overland Monthly, in publishing his article "The Wireless Telegraph in the U.S. Army Field Work," noted that he "possessed considerable literary ability" and was previously published in the "best magazines." In 1908 his Catechism of a Field Company, Signal Corps, U.S. Army OCLC 52254037 was published by the Chief Signal Officer. He authored a chapter in 1912 for The Curtiss Aviation Book, by Glenn Curtiss and Augustus Post, which gave his views on the military applications of the airplane, identifying four primary tasks: aggressive action (combat), fire control (communication by radio), aerial reconnaissance, and transportation (movement of materiel), only one of which was the province of the Signal Corps. Also in 1912 he submitted an article to the Infantry Journal, "Military Aviation in America: Its Needs." This article, published after Beck's return to the Infantry on 1 May 1912, advocated an air arm within the army independent of all other branches and reporting directly to the Chief of Staff, the first advocacy of many ultimately resulting in the creation of the United States Air Force in 1947. It also proposed tactical aircraft, a pilot selection process, limiting the process to commissioned officers, a year of flight training, pilot certification, regular flight medical examinations, additional pay and allowances for flying, and distinctive uniforms, insignia, and badges for aviators.

In February 1913, Representative James Hay (Democrat-Virginia), a gadfly of the traditional Army and a persistent opponent of the "Manchu Law," introduced a bill intended to establish a semi-autonomous "Air Corps," whose provisions included many of those advocated by Beck. The bill died, but the inclusion of many of its elements in the 1913 appropriations bill encouraged Hay to offer a revision in May, HR5304. The House Committee on Military Affairs held hearings in August 1913. Beck appeared to testify on behalf of the bill, the only officer to do so, repeating his views on military applications for the airplane. Appearing for the opposite view, among others, were Major William L. "Billy" Mitchell representing the General Staff, and Foulois and Arnold representing the Signal Corps, all of whom within six years became staunch advocates for an independent Air Force. Opposition in general held that the creation of an "Air Corps" independent of the Signal Corps was premature given the primitive development of military aviation to that time, while Beck argued that keeping aviation within the Signal Corps would stifle the very development needed. The original bill had its language expunged following the hearings and was rewritten to include some of the provisions while keeping aviation in the Signal Corps. The revised bill passed and became the enabling legislation for the Aviation Section, Signal Corps. (Note: Some historians have concluded that Beck, desiring to return to aviation, had personal advancement as a motive, and that he supported Hay in order to become head of the new Air Corps. As chief of a service corps, he would have been advanced to the rank of brigadier general for the term of the appointment. (Dwight R. Messimer, in Demers))

Leading the opposition to the bill was the acting Chief Signal Officer, Col. George P. Scriven. During his testimony he characterized the aviators advocating creation of an Air Corps as lacking in scientific knowledge and mature judgment, and aviation as "merely" an auxiliary means of communications to that already existing in the Signal Corps. Beck's testimony retorted that any Signal Corps claim to having technical knowledge about aviation was "a gigantic bluff," for which Scriven initiated disciplinary action against Beck but did not follow through. (Note: Scriven became the Chief Signal Officer and a brigadier general later in 1913. His hostility towards Army pilots contributed to a reprimand in 1916 from the Secretary of War following the Goodier court martial and resultant Senate Resolution SJ 65 investigating malfeasance in the Aviation Section.)

== Death ==
Following his graduation from additional pilot training, Beck and his family were assigned to Henry Post Field as commandant of the Air Service Observation School.

Beck's wife died on July 22, 1921, and afterward he lived in quarters at Fort Sill with his mother. Beck was friends with prominent oilman Jean P. Day (1877–1964), a retired member of the Oklahoma Supreme Court, and his wife Aubie. On April 3, 1922, Beck flew to Oklahoma City to visit the Days, intending to stay the night with them. They had dinner at the ornate Skirvin Hotel, with plans to go to the theater together afterward. Day, however, went to meet business associates, leaving Beck and Mrs. Day to attend the theater alone. They were to pick up Day at the hotel but instead met up with Day's business associates and their wives. They returned with the group for a social gathering at the home of one couple. Day was left a note of their whereabouts, joined the group, and at midnight suggested they all go to the Days' residence to continue the party. At approximately 2:00 am Day left his wife alone with Beck while he drove two of the guests home, and was gone approximately thirty minutes. (Note: Testimony at the inquest, however, claimed that Day left with all the guests, drove one couple home, and then returned to his residence so that an army officer guest, Major Richard Bolles Paddock Jr., an instructor at the Field Artillery school with whom Beck flew up from Fort Sill, could speak with Beck. Day then left again to take the remaining guests home. Paddock was the 30-year-old son of an illustrious retired colonel, a nephew of John J. Pershing, and married with an infant son. His whereabouts during the fatal confrontation were not established in news stories. He was reduced in rank to captain in December 1922 but then promoted again to major in January 1923. (Sherman Daily Democrat, p. 8; Sacramento Union, p. 2; Cullum's Biographical Register Vol. 7, p. 1037))

When he returned, Day alleged that he overheard Beck talking loudly and looked in a window to observe Beck struggling with Mrs. Day, and that she later claimed Beck had taken advantage of the opportunity to embrace her against her will and make sexual advances to her. Day stated he went into the house and either because as an army officer Beck might be armed, or because Beck was of an imposing physical stature, immediately went upstairs to obtain a revolver for self-protection. When he came downstairs, Beck appeared to have departed but Day found him hiding behind a partially closed portière. When Beck emerged, Day alleged that he approached him to compel him to leave his home and that Beck drew back his fist. Day claimed that he struck Beck over the head with the barrel of his gun, an old single-action revolver, which accidentally discharged.

Beck's skull was severely fractured, either by the blow or the impact of a bullet fragment, raising doubts about what happened. Pieces of his skull were recovered eight feet (2.4 m) from the body. County Attorney Forrest Hughes questioned the truthfulness of Day's statements, made at the coroner's inquest on April 9 and also in interviews with reporters (which accounted for the differing claims about why he had obtained the pistol), and raised the possibility that Day had argued violently with his wife shortly before he drove their guests home over attention she had paid Beck. Both he and Sheriff Ben Dancy claimed that Beck, shot in the back of the head, could not have been facing Day as claimed by Day when struck with the gun. The Army assigned a board of three officers stationed at Post Field (Note: The board consisted of Major Thomas G. Lanphier, Captain Vernon L. Burge, and Captain Roger McCullough.) to attend the inquest, investigate the circumstances, and report their findings to the Secretary of War. Their report included information from a woman attending the gathering that while Beck was sober, Day may have been intoxicated, (Note: The same information apparently reach the Federal Prohibition authorities in Oklahoma, who announced their own investigation into the possibility of "illicit liquor" being consumed at the party the day after the shooting. (NYT, April 5, 1912)) questioned why Day had driven home guests who lived only a block away, and why Day had struck Beck with the barrel of the gun instead of the butt.

The coroner's jury, however, chose to believe Day and ruled that he was justified in shooting Beck. Mrs. Day corroborated Day's version of events before the confrontation but claimed to have fainted before the homicide took place. Hughes did not file charges against Day, who despite declaring her "my dearest possession" at Beck's inquest, divorced his wife in 1923. The Army ruled that Beck was killed "in the line of duty" and "not due to his own willful misconduct." Secretary of War John W. Weeks endorsed the report on August 22. He was buried at Arlington National Cemetery.

== Notes ==
Footnotes

Citations
