= Brook Hill South, Pennsylvania =

Human settlement in Pennsylvania, United States

Coordinates: 39°55′48″N 76°42′07″W

Brook Hill South is a residential community in York County, Pennsylvania, United States with original construction starting in the early 1970s. It is adjacent, by way of crossing Tyler Run Road, but separate from the neighborhood of Brook Hill.
