= Hillbrook School =

School in California, United States

Location
- 300 Marchmont Dr. Los Gatos, CA 95032; 37.2275°N 121.9538°W

Information
- Former name: The Children's Country School
- School type: Independent
- Motto: Be Kind, Be Curious, Take Risks, Be Your Best
- Opened: 1935
- Head of school: Mark Silver
- Faculty: 53
- Employees: 86
- Grades: JK-12
- Gender: Coeducational
- Student to teacher ratio: 7:1
- Area: 14 acres
- Campus type: Suburban
- Mascot: Bear
- Accreditation: CAIS
- Website: http://hillbrook.org

Hillbrook School is an independent, accredited, co-educational JK-12 day school in Los Gatos, California, and San Jose, California, and was founded in 1935.

There are 365 students in junior kindergarten through 9th grade in the 2023-24 school year.

Hillbrook School has two campuses: the Los Gatos Campus, which holds Lower and Middle School (grades JK - 8), and downtown San Jose, which holds the Upper School (grades 9 - 12).

== History ==
Hillbrook, originally known as the Children's Country School, was founded by Mary Orem, Elizabeth Glassford, Nathalie Wollin, and Ann Boge. Hillbrook once extended as far as Shannon and Kennedy Roads to the North and South, but the property has since been subdivided to create the current 14-acre (57,000 m^{2}) campus.

A boarding school during its earliest years, Hillbrook became a day school in 1960, at which point the original name was changed to Hillbrook.

Robin Clements was headmaster from 1976–97, followed by Sarah Bayne from 1999-2009, with an interim headmaster serving in 1998. Mark Silver was appointed as current Head of School in 2009. Silver was recruited from Francis Parker School in San Diego, California.

== Founding of Hillbrook Upper School ==
In March of 2022, Hillbrook School's Board of Trustees unanimously voted to expand Hillbrook to include a high school. Shortly after the vote, Hillbrook signed leases with two historic buildings in downtown San Jose: the Moir Building and the San Jose Armory.

Hillbrook Upper School officially opened in Fall of 2023 in downtown San Jose, California.
