= San Jose Chamber of Commerce =

- Abbreviation: SJCC
- Established: 1886; 140 years ago
- Type: Chamber of commerce
- Purpose: Business & Economic Development and advocacy
- Headquarters: 101 W Santa Clara Street
- Location: San Jose, California, United States
- Coordinates: 37°20′6″N 121°53′30″W
- Region served: Silicon Valley
- Members: Over 1,000 (2021)
- Chairman of the Board: Ed Davis
- Vice Chairman of the Board (Chair-Elect): Roger Reedy
- President & CEO: Leah Toeniskoetter
- Board of directors: 48 directors
- Staff: 5
- Website: www.sjchamber.com
- Formerly called: Santa Clara Valley Board of Trade (1886–1899); Santa Clara Valley Improvement Association (1900); Association of Metropolitan San Jose (1968–1970); San Jose Metropolitan Chamber of Commerce (1988–1996); San Jose Silicon Valley Chamber of Commerce (1997–2016); Silicon Valley Organization (2017–2021)

The San Jose Chamber of Commerce is a chamber of commerce representing business interests in the Greater San Jose, California Area. It is the largest chamber of commerce in the Silicon Valley region. Founded in 1886, the chamber has played a role in the development of the local economy and politics.

== History ==
=== 19th century ===
The San Jose Chamber of Commerce was founded in 1886 as the Santa Clara Valley Board of Trade. In 1900, it briefly became the Santa Clara Valley Improvement Association before changing its name to the San Jose Chamber of Commerce the following year.

=== 20th century ===
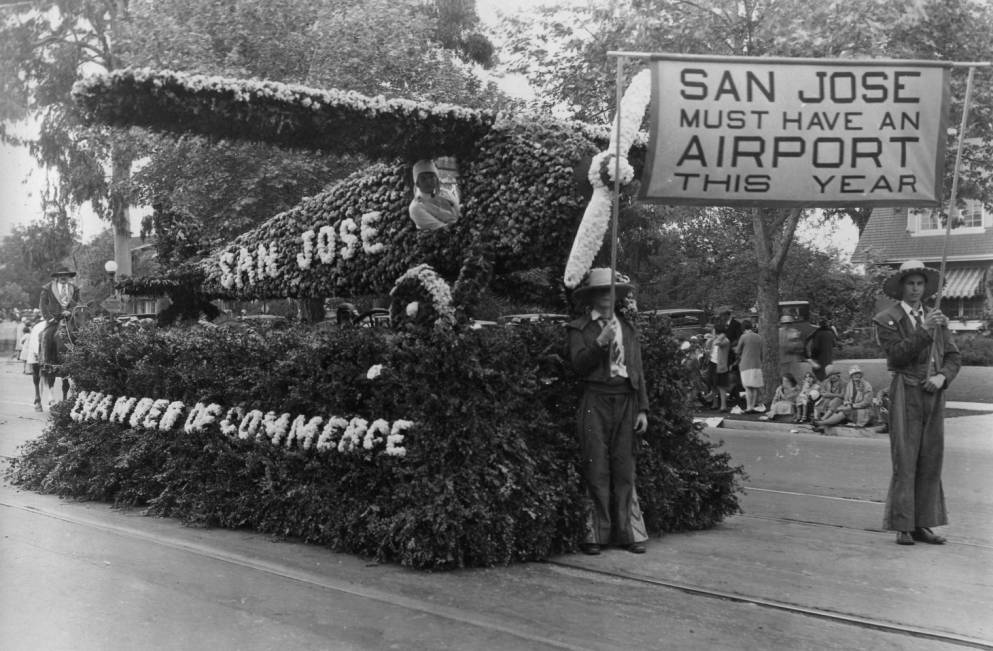
The San Jose Chamber of Commerce sponsored a float in the 1929 Fiesta de las Rosas parade to promote the construction of an airport.

In 1910, the chamber formed the Commission Government League to promote reforms to the San Jose city charter. Along with other upper- and middle-class progressive groups, the league forced a ballot initiative on replacing the city's political machine, which was dependent on working class voters, with a city commission government, modeled on that of Galveston, Texas, that they saw as less corrupt and more efficient. In 1914, the reform groups gained a majority of seats on the city council and appointed a commission to study charter reforms. It was dominated by the chamber and Merchant's Association and headed by Professor Thomas H. Reed of the University of California, Berkeley, who eschewed the city commission plan in favor of a council–manager government modeled on that of Dayton, Ohio.

In 1929, the chamber raised $480,000 in donations by Santa Clara County residents to acquire a 1,000-acre (400 ha) parcel of the Yñigo Ranch on the San Francisco Bay and sold it for a nominal price to the U.S. Navy to serve as an airbase for the USS Macon airship and later Moffett Federal Airfield. In 1939, Ernie Renzel, a wholesale grocer and future mayor of San Jose, led the chamber's Citizens Central Airport Committee and personally negotiated the purchase of 483 acres (195 ha) of the Stockton Ranch from the Crocker family to be the site of San Jose's municipal airport. Renzel led an effort to pass a bond measure to pay for the land in 1940, overcoming reluctance by fiscally conservative city councilmembers and City Manager C. B. Goodwin.

In 1944, and again from 1950 to 1965, the chamber partnered with the city and county and spent more than $1 million on aggressive national advertising campaigns, including advertisements in The New York Times, to attract major manufacturers to the Santa Clara Valley. In the 1960s, the chamber supported City Manager A. P. "Dutch" Hamann's city expansion plans and the bond measures to fund them.

The chamber was known as the Association of Metropolitan San Jose from 1968 until reverting to its previous name in 1971. In the late 1960s, the original Migrant Mother photograph by Dorothea Lange was found in a dumpster at the chamber's headquarters, along with 31 other unretouched, vintage photos by the photographer.

By the 1980s, the area's chambers of commerce had diminished in political influence, and the Santa Clara County Manufacturers Group became the dominant political special interest group in the area. In 1988, the chamber changed its name to the San Jose Metropolitan Chamber of Commerce. In 1997, it took the name San Jose Silicon Valley Chamber of Commerce.

=== 21st century ===
In 2017, the chamber rebranded as the Silicon Valley Organization (SVO) to appeal to businesses and government officials associated with Silicon Valley. Despite its new name, the organization largely continued to focus on businesses in San Jose. In 2019, the Santa Clara Chamber of Commerce, located in neighboring Santa Clara, responded by rebranding itself as the Silicon Valley Central Chamber of Commerce.

On August 26, 2021, the SVO reverted to its longstanding name, the San Jose Chamber of Commerce, to emphasize its support for small- and medium-sized businesses and distance itself from controversial political advertising by its former political action committee.

== Politics ==
As a business advocacy organization, the chamber consistently supports a pro-business political agenda. It supports immigration reform and opposes smart growth zoning changes that are favored by housing advocates.

=== Political action committee ===
The Silicon Valley Organization formerly operated a political action committee. The SVO PAC spent hundreds of thousands of dollars to support business-friendly candidates in each San Jose City Council election, often in opposition to candidates supported by the South Bay Labor Council.

The SVO PAC was repeatedly criticized for racial stereotyping in its advertising, including darkened photographs of Latino councilmembers Sergio Jimenez in 2016 and Sylvia Arenas in 2021, as well as for misleadingly doctoring a photograph of another candidate in 2018.

In October 2020, the SVO PAC published a controversial webpage against Jake Tonkel's campaign to unseat Councilmember Dev Davis. It featured a photo of Black rioters in South Africa and alleged that Tonkel supported defunding the San Jose Police Department. A number of prominent for-profit and non-profit member organizations, including 36% of the SVO's board of directors, left the SVO, criticizing it for a pattern of racist advertising. Under pressure from member organizations, President and CEO Matt Mahood issued an apology and resigned, and the SVO PAC was dissolved in November 2020.

== Leadership ==
The San Jose Chamber of Commerce is led by a chairman of the board, the organization’s highest-ranking official and leader of the executive committee and board. The role has been held by many notable leaders from the San Jose and Silicon Valley business community:

- Ed Davis, 2026
- Robert S. Lindo, 2025
- Nicholas E. Adams, 2024
- Dee Ann Harn, 2023 (hired Toeniskoetter as ceo)
- Tony Mirenda, 2022
- Glenn Perkins, 2021 (hired Seaver as ceo)
- Michael Bangs, 2020
- Lennies Gutierrez, 2019
- Dan Bozzuto, 2017
- Jim Lynch, 2016
- Sean Cottle, 2015
- Michelle Peacock, 2014
- Grace Davis, 2013
- Brian Baer, 2012
- Sunny Clagget, 2011 (hired Mahood as ceo)
- Gerry De Young, 2010
- Michael Busselen, 2009
- Bill Klein, 2008
- Nanci Williams, 2007
- Terry Austen, 2006
- Bill Baron, 2005 (hired Dando as ceo)
- Richard Roth, 2004
- Mike Fox Jr., 2003
- Phil Dirickson, 2002
- Mark Walker, 2001
- Jim Eller, 2000
- Mark Waxman, 1999
- Cindy Lazares, 1998
- Tommy Fulcher, 1997
- Armon Mills, 1996
- Michael Fox Sr., 1995
- Donald Callahan, 1994
- Robert Kieve, 1993
- John Kennett, 1992
- Brooks Mancini, 1991
- Chuck Reed, 1990 (hired Tedesco as ceo)
- Ervie Smith, 1989–1990 (first female chair elected by the board)
- Carl Cookson, 1987–1988
- Phil Sims, 1986–1987
- John Black, 1985–1986
- Jay Weinhardt, 1984–1985
- Drew Gibson, 1983–1984
- Dean Bartee, 1982–1983
- Don Allen, 1981–1982
- Dixon Howell, 1980–1981

The San Jose Chamber of Commerce has had 12 chief executive officers, hired by and serving at the pleasure of the board, in its history:

- D.B. Moody, 1886–1919
- Roscoe Wyatt, 1919–1944
- Russ Pettit, 1944–1964
- Fred Burtner, 1964–1969
- Sandy Webber, 1969–1974
- Ron James, 1974–1990
- Steve Tedesco, 1990–2000
- Jim Cunneen, 2000–2005
- Pat Dando, 2005–2011
- Matt Mahood, 2011–2020
- Derrick Seaver, 2020–2023
- Leah Toeniskoetter, 2024–present
