= Brook Hill, Pennsylvania =

Coordinates: 39°56′00″N 76°42′17″W

Brook Hill is a residential community in York County, Pennsylvania, United States. Brook Hill is one of the neighborhoods of York located in uppermost York Township and has a separate branch known as Brook Hill South.
