= Shenandoah Plaza National Historic District =

Historic district in California, United States

- US Naval Air Station Sunnyvale, California, Historic District
- U.S. National Register of Historic Places
- U.S. Historic district
- Location within San Jose, California Location within California Location within the United States
- Location: Naval Air Station Moffett Field, Sunnyvale, California
- Coordinates: 37.41182°N 122.05731°W
- Area: 124 acres (50 ha)
- Built by: US Navy Bureau of Yards and Docks
- Architectural style: Mission Revival, dirigible/blimp hangar style
- NRHP reference No.: 94000045
- Added to NRHP: February 24, 1994

The U.S. Naval Air Station, Sunnyvale Historic District, also known as Shenandoah Plaza, is a historic district located on 62.48 acres (25.3 ha) at Moffett Field, California.

Hangars One, Two, and Three, and the adjacent Shenandoah Plaza are inclusively designated as the historic district listed on the National Register of Historic Places. The Historic District was nominated by the US Navy and accepted into the National Register of Historic Places on Feb. 24, 1994. The Historic District was conveyed to NASA on July 1, 1994, as part of a federal military base reduction and closure action.

The historic district consists of:

- 124 acres
- 22 contributing buildings / structures
- 9 contributing houses
- 3 monuments
- Total floor area of historic buildings is 1,498,000 square feet

== History ==
In 1931, the city of Sunnyvale acquired a 1,000 acre (4 km^{2}) parcel of farmland bordering San Francisco Bay, paid for with nearly $480,000 raised by the citizens of Santa Clara County, then "sold" the parcel for $1 to the US government as a home base for the Navy airship USS Macon.

The location proved to be ideal for an airport, since the area is often clear while other parts of the San Francisco Bay are covered in fog. This is due to the Coast Range to the west, which blocks the cold oceanic air that causes San Francisco fog.

The base, originally named Airbase Sunnyvale CAL (it was thought that calling it Mountain View would cause officials to fear airships colliding with mountainsides), was accepted by the U.S. Navy on 12 February 1931, and dedicated NAS Sunnyvale on 12 April 1933. After the death of Rear Admiral William A. Moffett, who is credited with the creation of the airfield, in the loss of the USS Akron on 4 April 1933, the airfield at Naval Air Station Sunnyvale was named Moffett Field on 1 September 1933.

After the ditching of the USS Macon on 12 February 1935, and until 1942, the Navy transferred claimancy of Moffett Field to the War Department and the installation was under the control of the U.S. Army Air Corps.

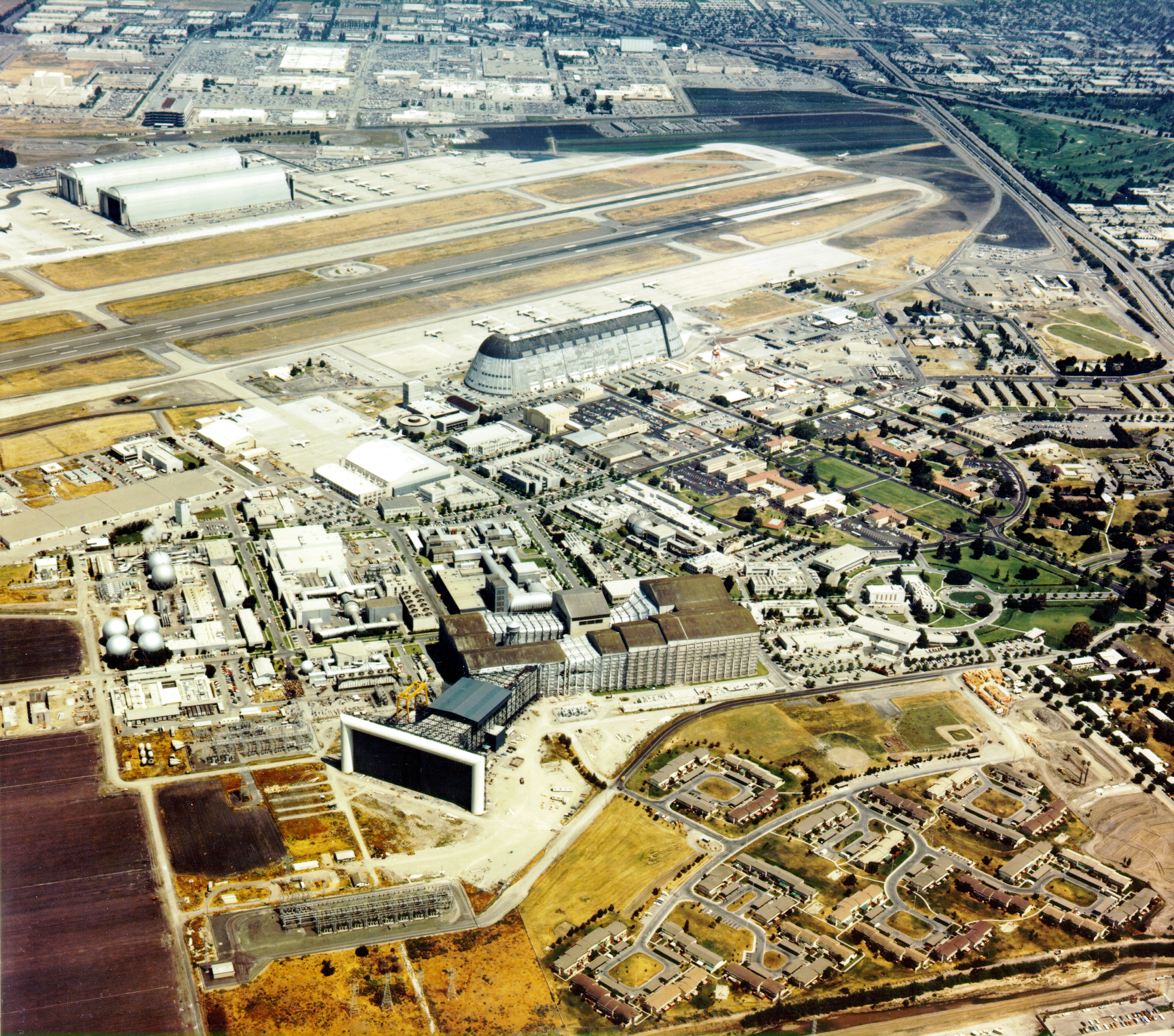
Aerial View of NAS Moffett Field and NASA Ames Research Center.

On April 16, 1942, control of the facility was returned to the Navy and it was recommissioned as NAS Sunnyvale. Four days later it was renamed NAS Moffett Field. From the end of World War II until its closure, NAS Moffett Field saw the development and use of several generations of land-based anti-submarine warfare and maritime patrol aircraft, including the Lockheed P2V Neptune and Lockheed P-3 Orion. Until the demise of the Soviet Union in 1991, and for some time thereafter, there was daily activity from NAS Moffett Field. This activity included anti-submarine, maritime reconnaissance, Fleet support, and various training sorties to patrol the U.S. Pacific coastline. In addition to these activities, squadrons and aircraft from Moffett Field periodically deployed to other bases in the Pacific and Indian Oceans, and the Persian Gulf for periods of up to six months.

== Hangar One ==
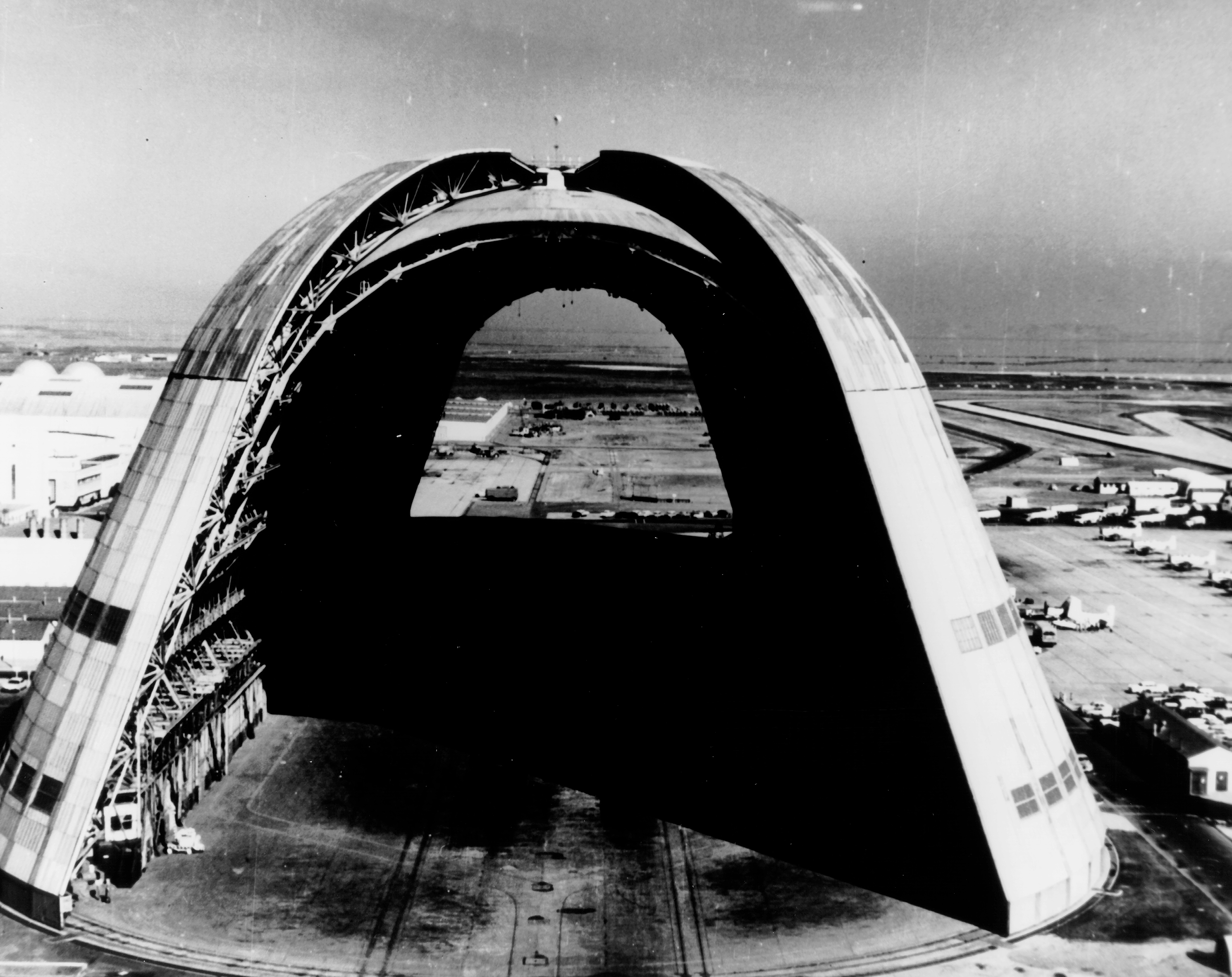
View of Hangar One, the huge dirigible hangar, with doors open at both ends.

Moffett Field's "Hangar One" was built in 1931 during the Depression era for the USS Macon, and is one of the largest unsupported structures in the country. The airship hangar is constructed on a network of steel girders sheathed with galvanized steel, and rests firmly upon a reinforced pad anchored to concrete pilings.

The airship hangar structure measures 1,133 feet (343 m) long and 308 feet (93 m) wide, and the floor covers eight acres (32,000 m^{2}) (the same size as six football fields).

The structure itself has aerodynamic architecture as its walls curve upward and inward, to form an elongated dome 198 feet (60 m) high. The clam-shell doors were designed to reduce turbulence when the Macon moved in and out on windy days. The "orange peel" style doors, weighing 500 tons (511.88 tonnes) each, are moved by their own 150 horsepower motors, which are operated via electrical control panel.

The hangar interior is so large that fog sometimes forms near the ceiling. A person unaccustomed to its vastness can be susceptible to optical disorientation, and looking across its deck, planes and tractors look like toys to some. Along the length of the hangar there are maintenance shops, inspection laboratories, and offices that support hangar actives. Looking up, a network of catwalks for access to all parts of the structure can be seen, and two elevators meet near the top, allowing maintenance personnel to get to the top quickly and easily.

Narrow gauge tracks run through the length of the hangar, forming a tramway, and during the period of airship, the rails extended across the apron and into the fields at each end of the hangar. This tramway facilitated the transportation of an airship on the mooring mast to the airship hangar interior, or to the flight position. During the brief period that the USS Macon (ZRS-5) was based at Moffett, Hangar One accommodated not only the giant airship, but several smaller non-rigid lighter-than-air aircraft simultaneously.

== Hangars Two and Three ==
In 1940, the US Navy proposed to the US Congress the development of a lighter-than-air station program for anti-submarine patrolling of the coast and harbors. Moffett Field's Hangars Two and Three (Mountain View, California) were built at the beginning of WWII for a coastal defense program. These hangars are still among the world's largest freestanding unsupported wood structures.

The original contract was for steel hangars, 960 feet (290 m) long, 328 feet (100 m) wide and 190 feet (58 m), helium storage and service, barracks for 228 men, a power plant, landing mat, and a mobile mooring mast. The Second Deficiency Appropriation Bill for 1941, passed July 3, 1941, changed the authorization to the construction of 8 facilities to accommodate a total of 48 airships (as requested in 1940), but due to steel rations, a total of 17 large wooden hangars were built among 10 LTA bases.

As finally developed in 1943, LTA facilities in addition to NAS Lakehurst (2) and NAS Moffett Field (2), included NAS South Weymouth (1), NAS Weeksville (1), NAS Glynco (2), Naval Air Station Richmond (3), NAS Houma (1), NAS Hitchcock (1), NAS Santa Ana (2) and NAS Tillamook (2). In the initial program, accommodations were provided for six airships at each station. This was later increased to twelve at seven of the stations, and to eighteen at NAS Richmond, both as a result of an increase in the authorized strength to 200 airships.

Seven of the original seventeen wooden hangars still exist: Moffett Field (2), Tustin, California (2), Tillamook, Oregon (1), and Lakehurst, New Jersey(2).

=== Popular culture ===
An episode of the Discovery Channel TV show MythBusters used one these smaller hangars to disprove the myth that it is not possible to fold a sheet of paper in half more than seven times. The sheet of paper covered nearly the full width of the airship hangar. Other episodes of Mythbusters have utilized the hangar to test myths such as "Inflating a football with helium allows longer kick distances" and "Airworthy aircraft can be constructed of concrete."

== Other historic buildings ==
Many of the buildings at Moffett Field which once supported its active military presence have been contaminated with asbestos within the structures, and require restoration. This is an ongoing project within NASA Research Park an annex to NASA Ames Research Center.

=== Wooden hangars ===
==== 1941 ====
The Second Deficiency Appropriation Bill for 1941, passed on 3 July 1941, introduced strict control of strategic materials like steel causing a change in construction material to wood. Standardized plans were drawn up by the Navy Department Bureau of Yards and Docks, with Arsham Amirikian acting as principal engineer.

==== 1942 ====
Hangars Two and Three at Moffett Field are 1,075 ft (328 m) long, 297 ft (91 m) wide and 171 ft (52 m) high, with an extruded parabolic form that reflected the profile of the airship vessels to be accommodated. A total of 51 Douglas Fir heavy-timber trusses resting on concrete bent frames contain the two-story shop and office areas. Two concrete and wood post and lintel structures support 121 ft (37 m) high multi-track rolling doors at either end.

==== 1943 ====
A total of 17 wooden hangars were commissioned by the Navy Department Bureau of Yards and Docks in 1943, including those at Naval Air Station Lakehurst (2), Naval Air Station Moffett Field (2), Naval Air Station South Weymouth (1), Naval Air Station Weeksville (1), Naval Air Station Glynco (2), Naval Lighter Than Air Station Richmond (3), Naval Air Station Houma (1), Naval Air Station Hitchcock (1), Naval Lighter-Than-Air Station Santa Ana (2) and Naval Air Station Tillamook (2), with each hangar accommodating six airships.
