= Rancho Posolmi =

Mexican land grant in California

Coordinates: 37.420°N 122.050°W

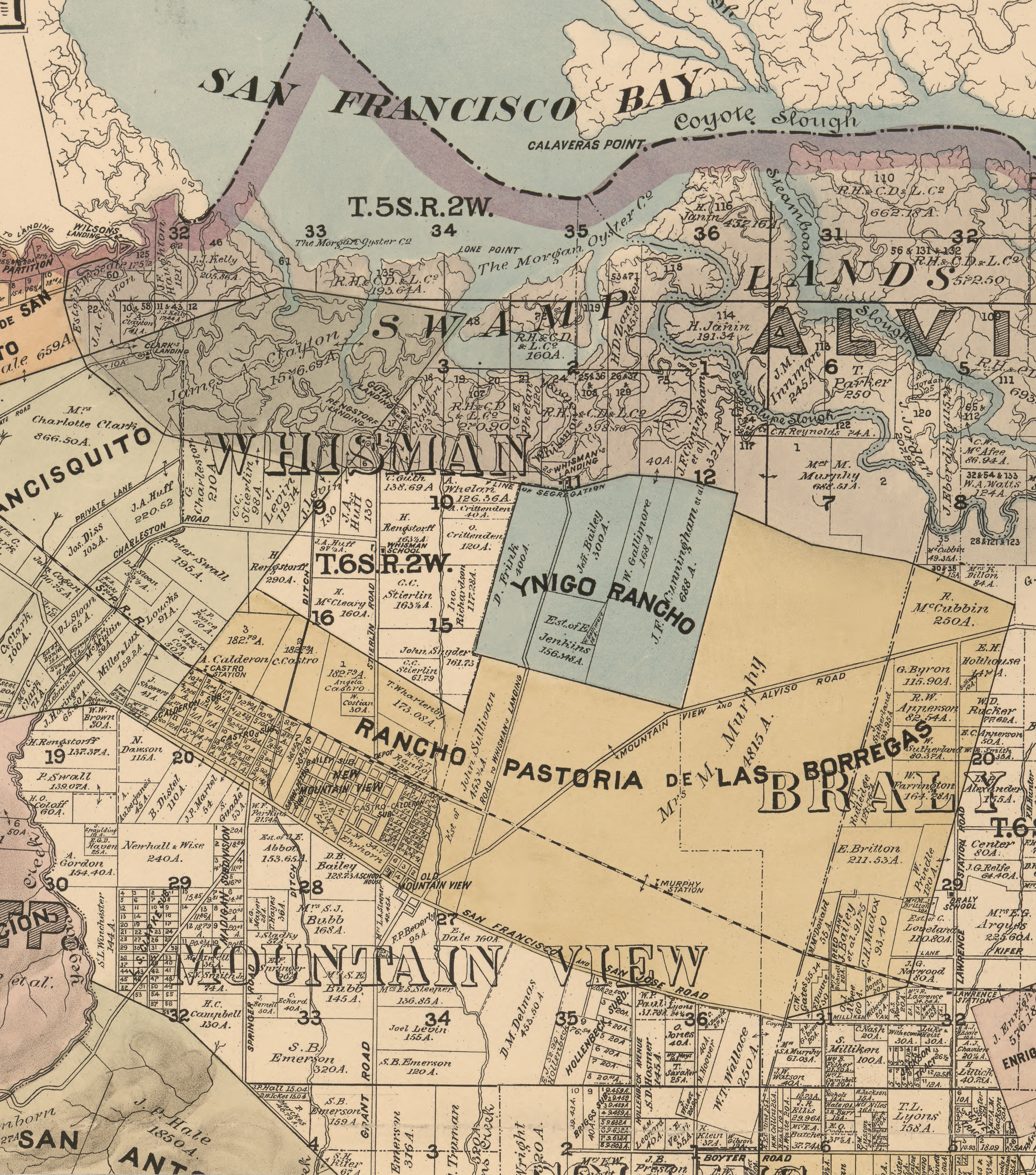
1890 Map showing Rancho Posolmi, here called Ynigo Rancho

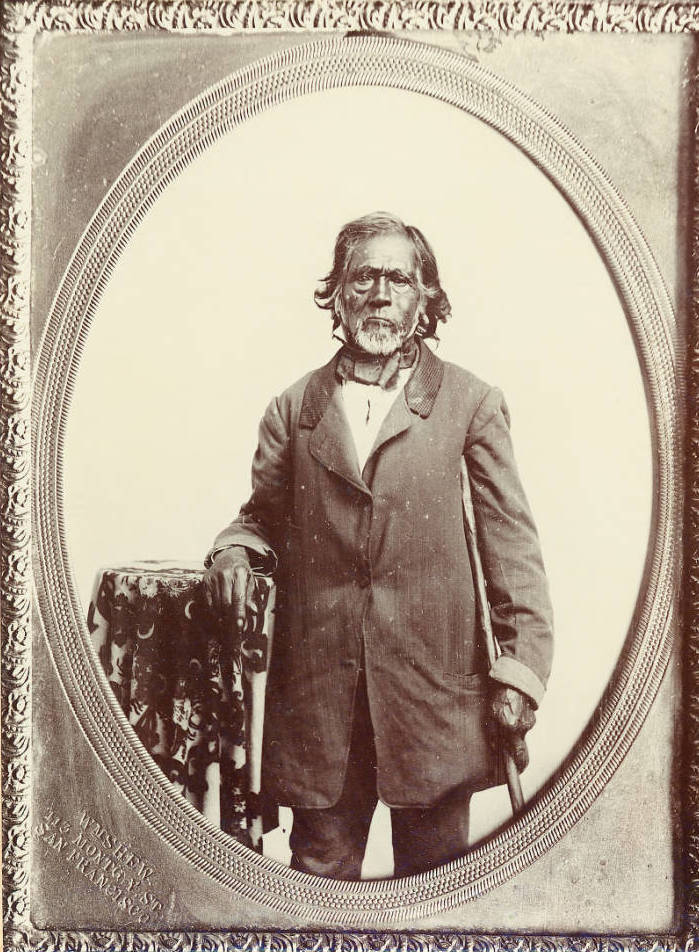
Lupe Yñigo was granted Rancho Posolmi in 1844, covering the northern part of Sunnyvale and Mountain View.

Rancho Posolmi also known as Ranch Yñigo was a 1,696-acre (6.86 km^{2}) Mexican land grant in present-day Santa Clara County, California given in 1844 by Governor Manuel Micheltorena to Lupe Yñigo. The name refers to Posolmi village of the Ohlone. The grant encompassed present-day Moffett Field in Sunnyvale.

== History ==
Lupe Yñigo (1781-1864), an Ohlone Indian, who was appointed an alcalde at Mission Santa Clara, was given a land grant in 1844, and retained over 800 acres (3 km^{2}) until his death in 1864. Yñigo was one of the last of the Ohlones to be associated with Mission Santa Clara de Asis.

Robert Walkinshaw was a native of Scotland, who came from Mexico in 1847 to take charge of the New Almaden Quicksilver Mine for Baron, Forbes and Company, a British trading firm.

With the cession of California to the United States following the Mexican-American War, the 1848 Treaty of Guadalupe Hidalgo provided that the land grants would be honored. As required by the Land Act of 1851, a claim for Rancho Posolmi was filed with the Public Land Commission in 1852, and the grant was patented to Thomas Campbell, Robert Walkinshaw, and Lopez Yñigo in 1881.

In July 1931, 1,000 acres (4.0 km^{2}) sold by eight of the landowners were purchased by Bay Area communities and sold to the Navy for $1, to be used for an air base, later named Moffett Field. They land was sold for $1 to make the deal attractive to the Navy; the sale was orchestrated by local real estate agent Laura Thane Whipple.
