= Aeronautical Division, U.S. Signal Corps =

Aeronautical Division, Signal Corps
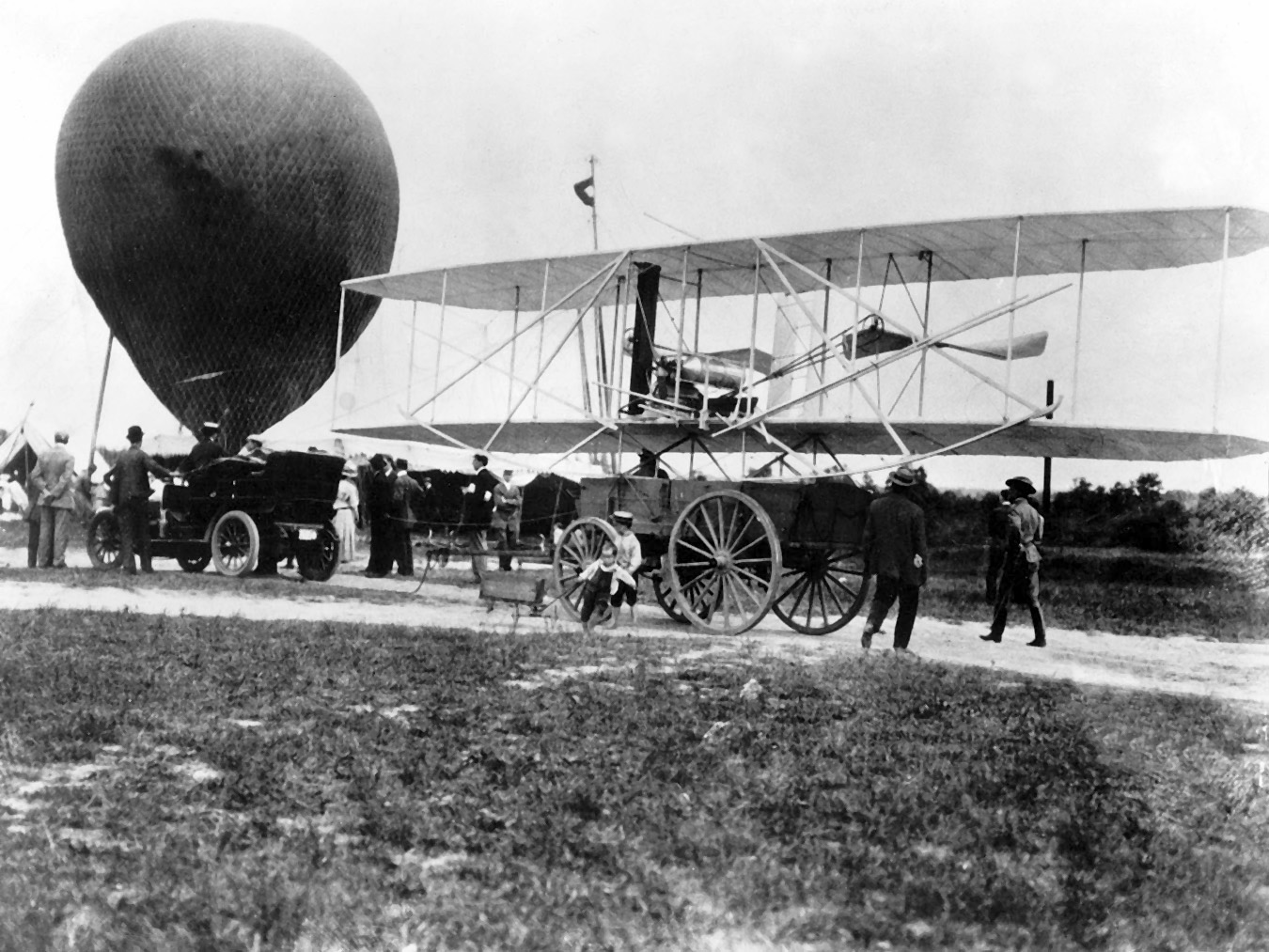
- The first Wright airplane arriving at Ft. Myer, VA, 1 September 1908
- Active: 1 August 1907–18 July 1914
- Country: United States
- Branch: United States Army
- Type: Air force
- Role: Aerial warfare
- Size: (1913) 18 pilots, 100 support personnel 31 total airplanes 1909–1914
- Part of: Signal Corps

The Aeronautical Division, Signal Corps (1907–1914) was the first heavier-than-air military aviation organization in history and the progenitor of the United States Air Force. A component of the U.S. Army Signal Corps, the Aeronautical Division procured the first powered military aircraft in 1909, created schools to train its aviators, and initiated a rating system for pilot qualifications. It organized and deployed the first permanent American aviation unit, the 1st Aero Squadron, in 1913. The Aeronautical Division trained 51 officers and 2 enlisted men as pilots, and incurred 13 fatalities in air crashes. During this period, the Aeronautical Division had 29 factory-built aircraft in its inventory, built a 30th from spare parts, and leased a civilian airplane for a short period in 1911. (Note: S.C. No. 30, a Curtiss J, was to have been the 31st aircraft, but although ordered at the same time as S.C. No. 29, was not delivered until September.)

Following statutory authorization of an Aviation Section in the Signal Corps by the United States Congress in 1914, the Aeronautical Division continued as the primary organizational component of the section until April 1918, when its inefficiency in mobilizing for World War I caused the War Department to replace it with an organization independent of the Signal Corps that eventually became the foundation of the Army's Air Service.

== Birth of an air arm ==
August 1, 1907

OFFICE MEMORANDUM NO. 6

An Aeronautical Division of this office is hereby established, to take effect this date.

This division will have charge of all matters pertaining to military ballooning, air machines, and all kindred subjects. All data on hand will be carefully classified and plans perfected for future tests and experiments. The operations of this division are strictly confidential, and no information will be given out by any party except through the Chief Signal Officer of the Army or his authorized representative.

Captain Charles DeF. Chandler, Signal Corps, is detailed in charge of this division, and Corporal Edward Ward and First-class Private Joseph E. Barrett will report to Captain Chandler for duty in this division under his immediate direction.

— J. Allen, Brigadier General, Chief Signal Officer of the Army

The United States Army Signal Corps became associated with aeronautics during the American Civil War, when Thaddeus S. C. Lowe was named chief of the Union Army Balloon Corps. In 1892, Major General Adolphus Greely, Chief Signal officer of the Army, formulated plans for a War Balloon detachment for the Signal Corps and authorized the purchase of a balloon from France, dubbed the General Myer, (Note: The General Myer and Fort Myer, Virginia, were named for Colonel Albert J. Myer, Signal Officer of the Army of the Potomac during the American Civil War. Ironically, Myer snagged John Wise's balloon in trees trying to deliver it to the Bull Run battlefield, then in August 1863 rejected the balloon unit outright as costing more than it was worth. (Heimdahl & Hurley 1997, p. 5)) based at Fort Riley in 1893 and Fort Logan in 1894. When the General Myer deteriorated, a second balloon, the Santiago, was manufactured by members of the Signal Corps in 1897 using the General Myer as a model, and served in combat in Cuba in 1898. (Note: The Santiago, after observing Spanish movements near El Caney on June 30, 1898, was placed within 650 yards of the Spanish trenches on San Juan Hill on July 1, where it was struck repeatedly by small arms fire and shrapnel. Badly damaged, it was not used again. (Greely, "Balloons in War", pp. 48–49))

In 1898–99, the War Department accepted the report of an aeronautically minded investigating committee that included Alexander Graham Bell and invested $50,000 for the rights to a heavier-than-air flying machine being developed by Samuel Pierpont Langley, Secretary of the Smithsonian Institution. Although Langley's "Aerodrome" failed embarrassingly, the Army later resumed its interest in aviation as a result of the success of the Wright Brothers and entered into protracted negotiations for an airplane.

All balloon school activities of the U.S. Army Signal Corps were transferred to Fort Omaha, Nebraska, in 1905. In 1906, the commandant of the Signal School in Fort Leavenworth, Kansas, Major George O. Squier, studied aeronautical theory and lectured on the Wright flying machine. One of his instructors—Captain Billy Mitchell—was also a student of aviation and taught the use of reconnaissance balloons. Squier became executive officer to the Chief Signal Officer, Brigadier General James Allen, in July 1907, and immediately convinced Allen to create an aviation entity within the Signal Corps.

The Aeronautical Division, Signal Corps, consisting at its inception of one officer and two enlisted men, began operation on August 1, 1907. Captain Charles deForest Chandler was named to head the new division, with Corporal Edward Ward and Private First Class Joseph E. Barrett as his assistants. (Note: Ward was commissioned during World War I and received a balloonist license. Barrett, with a fear of hydrogen balloons, deserted soon after the establishment of the Division but served honorably later in the U.S. Navy.) 1st Lt. Frank P. Lahm, a cavalry officer, was also detailed to the division and joined it September 17, 1907. Both Chandler and Lahm were balloonists. Lahm had earned renown the year before when he won the inaugural Gordon Bennett Cup, an international balloon event, while Chandler was already a member of the Aero Club of America. He remained head of the division until 1908, then again from 1911 to 1913. During the interim, he was relieved by Lahm and from May 1910 to June 1911 (while Chandler attended the Signal School Course at Fort Leavenworth) by Capt. Arthur S. Cowan, a former infantry officer and non-aviator assigned to the Signal School.

On December 23, 1907, the Signal Corps issued Specification No. 486 for a heavier-than-air flying machine and requested bids. A copy of the specification was sent to the Wrights on January 3, 1908. The following April 30 Lahm and 1st Lt. Thomas E. Selfridge (Note: Selfridge was a Field Artillery officer interested in aeronautics who had been working with Canadian inventor Alexander Graham Bell since the summer of 1907 after being turned down by the Wright Brothers) reported to New York City along with civilian balloonist Leo Stevens to familiarize 25 members of the First Company, Signal Corps, a unit of the 71st New York Infantry, in the use of hydrogen-filled kite balloons. The company was organized to provide the New York National Guard with an "aeronautical corps" for balloon observation, commanded by Major Oscar Erlandean.

=== Acquisition of aircraft ===
In 1908, the Aeronautical Division, at the intercession of President Theodore Roosevelt in the acquisition process, purchased a nonrigid dirigible from Thomas Scott Baldwin for US$6,750 (equivalent to $241,875 in 2025), and an airplane from the Wright Brothers for US$25,000 (equivalent to $895,833 in 2025). Specification No. 486 required both types of aircraft be able to carry two persons. The dirigible had to be able to carry a load of 450 pounds (200 kg) and reach a speed of 20 miles per hour (32 km/h); the airplane's requirements were a load of 350 pounds (160 kg), a speed of 40 miles per hour (64 km/h), and a flying distance of at least 125 miles (201 km).

The dirigible was delivered first, in July 1908, after Baldwin submitted an extremely low bid to ensure receiving the contract. Baldwin and Glenn Curtiss flew the test trials over Fort Myer and met all specifications except speed, which was just under the requirement. It was designated Signal Corps Dirigible No. 1. During August, Baldwin trained three officer candidates to fly the dirigible: Lahm, Selfridge, and 1st Lt. Benjamin Foulois, Infantry. Foulois was trained as the first dirigible pilot and prepared to move the ship from Fort Omaha to St. Joseph, Missouri, for a state fair exhibition. However, the first solo ascent in the dirigible, and the first flight solely by army pilots, did not occur until May 26, 1909.

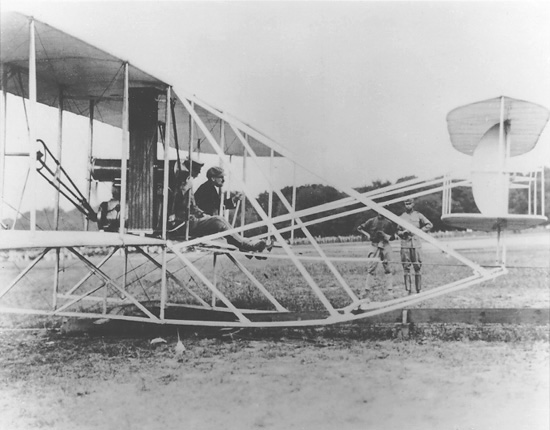
1st Lt. Frank Lahm and Orville Wright in the first U.S. Army airplane, S.C. No. 1, July 27, 1909

The Wright Brothers, who had been asking US$100,000 (equivalent to $3,583,333 in 2025) for their airplane, then agreed to sell a Wright Model A satisfying the requirements for $25,000 (they also received a US$5,000 (equivalent to $179,167 in 2025) bonus for exceeding the speed requirement). The airplane was delivered to Fort Myer, Virginia, on September 1, 1908, for trials. The first acceptance flight of the airplane was made on September 3 at Fort Myer, with Orville at the controls. Selfridge and Lahm were named official observers of the trials of the Wright aeroplane for September 1908. Both Lahm and Squier made acceptance flights as observers, and on September 13, Wright kept the airplane aloft for an hour and ten minutes.

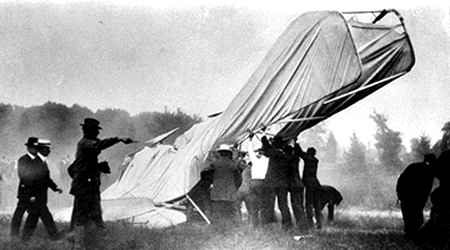
Crashed Wright Flyer that took the life of Selfridge September 17, 1908

On the afternoon of September 17, 1908, two officers of the United States Navy, Lieut. George C. Sweet and Naval Constructor (Lieut.) William McEntee, and another from the Marine Corps, 2nd Lt. Richard B. Creecy, were present at Fort Myer as official observers, accompanied by Secretary of the Navy Victor H. Metcalf. Under orders to travel to St. Joseph for the dirigible exhibition, Selfridge asked to take Sweet's place on a scheduled test flight, conducted in front of 2,500 onlookers. (Note: 31-year-old George Cook Sweet was not a prospective aviator but an expert in the new field of wireless telegraphy. The Washington Post, reporting Creecy's suicide in 1930, stated that he lost his place on the flight in a coin toss with the Selfridge. This assertion, possibly a family anecdote, is unsubstantiated by any other source.) During the flight, flying at 150 feet (46 m), a propeller split and shattered on the fourth lap, severing a guy wire to the rudder, and caused the airplane to crash. (Note: Because Sweet was his heaviest passenger to date (his weight variously given as 175 to 190 pounds (79 to 86 kg)), Wright had installed new, slightly longer propellers for the flight. Lahm was of the opinion that the propeller failure occurred when vibration caused its extended length to nick the guy wire repeatedly until the propeller broke, pulling the wire from its socket at the same time. Octave Chanute testified to the investigating board that the spruce wood of the propeller was brittle. The crash convinced Secretary Metcalf not to pursue naval aviation and may have led to his resignation two months later for reasons of health. Sweet, however, was encouraged by Rear Adm. William S. Cowles, brother-in‑law of President Roosevelt and Chief of the Bureau of Equipment, to continue lobbying the Navy to acquire and test an airplane. The 29-year-old McEntee, an aviation enthusiast, was assigned three years later to the staff of Capt. David W. Taylor at the Experimental Model Basin at the Washington Navy Yard, helping develop the Navy's first seaplanes. During World War I, at the end of his naval career, Sweet built a powerful radio transmitter in France and was awarded the Navy Cross. Turnbull & Lord 1949, p. 5.) Wright was hospitalized, and Selfridge—the Army's only officer experienced in heavier-than-air flight—was killed in the first fatal crash of an airplane. (Note: Selfridge had nearly been killed the previous December 6 in the crash of one of Bell's kites, AEA Cygnet, at the end of a test flight.)

Orville Wright, along with Wilbur this time, returned to Fort Myer in June 1909 with a new though smaller and faster airplane, powered by the engine from the wrecked 1908 Flyer. The brothers spent the better part of July fine tuning the airplane and warming up for the final tests while bad flying weather hampered much of the month. For 1909's acceptance trials both Lahm and Foulois were named as official observers.

Lahm flew with Wright on July 27, and on July 30, with President William H. Taft as a spectator, Foulois and Wright in the final acceptance trial made a cross country flight of 10 miles (16 km) around Shuter's (or Shooters) Hill between Fort Myer and Alexandria, Virginia. This flight broke all of the existing records for speed, duration with a passenger, and altitude with a passenger. Pleased with the performance of this airplane the Army purchased it awarding the Wrights US$25,000 (equivalent to $895,833 in 2025) plus an added bonus of US$5,000 (equivalent to $179,167 in 2025) ($1,000 for each mile achieved over 40 miles per hour (64 km/h)). The plane's best speed had been 45 miles per hour (72 km/h), bringing the total sale price to US$30,000 (equivalent to $1,075,000 in 2025).

== Airplane operations ==
=== First solo flights ===
The Army accepted the Wright A Military Flyer on August 2, 1909, designating it "Signal Corps (S.C.) No. 1". On August 25, the Army leased 160 acres (0.65 km^{2}) of land along the Baltimore and Ohio Railroad at College Park, Maryland, for use as a training field. The newly purchased airplane was delivered to College Park on October 7, assembled by Wilbur Wright, and flown for the first time the next day. Wright began instruction of Lahm and 2nd Lt Frederic E. Humphreys, detailed from the Corps of Engineers, flying constantly in front of often large crowds of curiosity seekers, newspaper reporters, and dignitaries. Both soloed on October 26, Humphreys going ahead of Lahm (the detachment commander) because it was his turn to fly. Although both flights were of less than 15 minutes in duration and 30 ft (9.1 m) of altitude, late in the day Lahm remained aloft for 40 minutes, telling Wright he landed only because it was suppertime. The Army's contract with the Wright Brothers ended with the completion of training of the two student pilots, and Wilbur Wright made his last public flight on November 2. Later that day, Lahm took Lieut. Sweet up as a passenger and he became the first naval officer to fly.

On November 5, both pilots were aboard the airplane, with Lahm at the controls, when it crashed in a low altitude turn. Although neither pilot was injured, and the Wrights bore the expense of repairs, the crash ended flights until 1910. Both Lahm and Humphreys returned to duty with their respective branches. (Note: Henry H. Arnold recorded in his memoirs that Humphreys was recalled to the Corps of Engineers after being detached only two months because of a "holier than thou" attitude by the Corps, while Lahm had been recalled to the Cavalry because it was reported he had taken a woman up in his plane. In actuality, it had been Wilbur Wright who flew Sarah (possibly Sadie) Van Deman, the wife of Capt. Ralph H. Van Deman of the 21st Infantry, as a passenger on October 26 to fulfill a pledge made to this friend of his sister Katherine. While Humphreys was not a "Manchu Law" victim, and resigned his commission the next year as a result of his recall, Lahm's time away from the Cavalry had reached its four-year maximum. (Pool, pp. 344–345; Allen, "Wright Military Training"))

=== Foulois and Beck ===
The dirigible service proved short-lived, as the corrosive effects of weather and the hydrogen gas used to lift the ship caused the gasbag to leak with increasing severity. The dirigible was condemned and sold at auction. Foulois had been a vocal critic of the dirigible, recommending that it be abandoned, and although one of the two candidates selected to be trained as an airplane pilot, he was sent to Nancy, France instead as a delegate to the International Congress of Aeronautics. Foulois arrived back from France on October 23 and was given some preliminary flight time with Wilbur Wright, even though Wright was not contractually obligated to do so, with the intent that Humphreys would complete Foulois' training.

In November 1909, Foulois became the only officer detailed to the Aeronautical Division. He accrued three hours and two minutes total flying time at College Park but did not solo. Because of inclement winter weather at College Park, Foulois was assigned to move the flying program to Fort Sam Houston, an Army post near San Antonio, Texas. Foulois and eight enlisted men (Note: The enlisted men, representing the entire air corps of the Army in 1910 and early 1911, were Sgt. (later lieutenant colonel) Stephen J. Idzorek, Sgt. Herbert Marcus, Cpl. (later colonel) Vernon L. Burge, Pvt. Glenn R. Madole, Pvt. R.W. Brown, Pvt. Felix G. Clarke, Pvt. William C. Abolin, and Pvt. Bruce Pierce. Pvt. Kenneth L. Kintzel was detailed to the detachment after it reached Texas. He and Burge accompanied S.C. No. 7 to the Philippines in 1912. (Cunningham 2004, p. 32, and Cameron 1999, p. 40)) disassembled the still-damaged S.C. No. 1, shipped it to Texas in 17 crates, and reassembled it on February 23, 1910, after building a shed to house it on the Arthur MacArthur Field used for cavalry drill. On 2 March 1910, after training himself, Foulois logged his first solo from 9:30am to 9:37am and four flights in total, crashing the S.C. No. 1 on its final landing. He achieved a maximum altitude of 200 ft (61 m) and a speed of 50 mph (80 km/h) in logging 59 minutes and 30 seconds of flight time. He flew the repaired craft five times on March 12, and received written instruction by mail from the Wright Brothers. Until 1911, Foulois remained as the Army's sole aviator and innovator. He stated in annotating the aircraft's flight log that he installed a 4 ft (1.2 m) leather cinch strap from the Cavalry saddlery as a safety belt on the S.C. No. 1 on March 12, 1910, then on August 8 he and Oliver Simmons bolted wheels from a cultivator onto the landing skids to provide the first landing gear. S.C. No. 1 made its last flight, and the 66th on it by Foulois, on February 8, 1911.

In early 1911, the United States gathered much of the Regular Army in south Texas as a show of force to Mexican revolutionaries, forming the "Maneuver Division". In March 1911 near Fort McIntosh at Laredo, Texas, Foulois and Wright instructor Philip Orin Parmelee demonstrated the use of airplanes in support of ground maneuvers for the first time. The S.C. No. 1 was not sufficiently airworthy for the reconnaissance and messaging missions it performed, and for a nominal fee of one dollar, Foulois rented the Wright B Flyer privately owned by Robert J. Collier, owner of Collier's Weekly, on February 21. Foulois and Parmalee landed the rented airplane in the Rio Grande during their second flight, on March 5. (Note: Flying at 75 feet, the Collier Wright B lost altitude when the pilots accidentally killed the engine while admiring a flight of ducks. It flipped over onto its back when the engine restarted at full throttle as it skimmed the water during their frantic attempts to regain powered flight. When it was retrieved, it was found that little actual damage had been incurred, and the aircraft was repaired and placed back in service. (Pool, p. 359))

Squier, now Chief Signal Officer of the Maneuver Division, formed a provisional aero company on April 5, 1911, the first aviation unit in American history, (Note: In May 1908, 25 members of the 1st Signal Company, New York National Guard, formed an unofficial balloon unit ("aeronautical corps") instructed by Lahm, Selfridge, and civilian balloonist Albert Stevens. By 1910 it had acquired a home-made aircraft using private funds and transported it to summer maneuvers, but it was not flown. The aircraft was destroyed in a crash but another was acquired which did fly in the 1912 summer maneuvers. This group sometimes referred to itself as the "1st Aero Company" but was never authorized or officially recognized. In November 1915 it was officially authorized by the governor of New York.) in anticipation of training 18 additional pilots. (Note: Squier became Chief of the Aviation Section of the Signal Corps in 1916. The 18 pilots were volunteers who were permitted to train in their spare time while conducting their regular duties. Only two qualified as rated pilots before World War I. (Hennessy 1958, p. 42)) Five new airplanes were authorized for purchase, and two were received at Fort Sam on April 20, a Curtiss 1911 "Type IV military aeroplane" (Curtiss Model D) designated Signal Corps No. 2, and a new Wright Model B that became S.C. No. 3. Both came equipped with wheels rather than skids, and the Curtiss aircraft was powered by an 8-cylinder, 60 hp (45 kW) engine in sharp contrast to the 40 hp (30 kW) 4-cylinder training engines the student pilots were accustomed to. Two civilian pilots, Frank Trenholm Coffyn of the Wright Company and Eugene Ely from Curtiss, arrived with the aircraft to assist in instruction. All three of the Army's aircraft took to the air at the same time on April 22, 1911, during a parade and review of troops of the Maneuver Division at Fort Sam Houston, captured in a panoramic photograph linked below.

After Army acceptance of the aircraft on April 27, Foulois and Ely then undertook training a small group pilot candidates on the Curtiss machine, including three (Capt. Paul W. Beck, 2nd Lt. George E.M. Kelly, and 2nd Lt. John C. Walker, Jr.) who had been partially trained as prospective Curtiss instructors by Glen Curtiss at North Island, San Diego, California, before being ordered to Texas. Student pilots were divided into separate sections because the flight controls on the two types were markedly different and the single-seat Curtiss machines did not allow for dual instruction. S.C. No. 1, judged no longer airworthy due to many rebuilds, was retired from service on May 4 and sent to the Smithsonian Institution in October.

The most proficient new pilot was Beck, who by seniority was made commander of the provisional aero company, causing a permanent rift between himself and Foulois, by far the more experienced pilot. The Curtiss machine, S.C. No.2, nearly crashed on May 2 with Walker at the controls, nose-diving when Walker attempted a turn. The plane cartwheeled and although Walker miraculously regained control, he was so badly shaken that he voluntarily withdrew from flying. The next day Beck crash-landed S.C. No. 2 when its engine failed while he was at 300 ft (91 m), severely damaging it. On May 10, Kelly, the least experienced pilot, was killed flying the same airplane on his qualification flight when he crashed while landing in gusty wind conditions. The division commander, Major General William H. Carter, immediately withdrew permission to fly at Fort Sam. (Note: According to one source, Carter disliked airplanes and believed they had no military value whatsoever. (Pool, p. 366) However, another states that Carter, a cavalry veteran of the Indian Wars, was impressed when Foulois delivered orders to troops more than 25 miles from his headquarters and returned within an hour. His views regarding the utility of the airplane as a military tool may have been influenced by the death of his own son a few months earlier in an industrial accident. (Machoian, pp. 19–20)) Foulois, who was a mustang officer and a combat veteran of the Spanish–American War, blamed the crash on improper repairs to the Curtiss D, and indirectly, on Beck. Foulois also refused to serve under Beck, who took over as instructor and moved the school back to College Park with S.C. No. 3 in June. (Note: S.C. No. 2, the Curtiss D in which Lt. Kelly was killed, was not returned to service until July 25, after its engine had been swapped with a less powerful one from the new Curtiss Model E, S.C. 6 (Cameron, p. 44).) Foulois remained behind with the Maneuver Division and was removed from aviation in July by assignment to the Militia Bureau in Washington, D.C. Beck served as the Curtiss instructor at College Park until May 1, 1912, when he was returned to the Infantry by enforcement of the so-called "Manchu Law". (Note: The "Detached Service Law", familiarly known in the Army as the "Manchu Law", was a provision of the Army appropriations act passed by Congress on 24 August 1912 that required a Detached Officers List be kept by the Army to enforce its regulation limiting the amount of time an officer could spend away from the organization in which he was commissioned. Prior to passage of the act, detached service was limited by policy, using a regulation created and enforced by War Department General Order No. 68 (26 May 1911), issued in response to criticism of the forming of a General Staff in 1903, which many philosophically opposed in a standing army. The regulation was also intended to curb favoritism shown in embassy and other "soft living" assignments perceived as "homesteading", and affected many Army agencies and all aviation officers except those permanently assigned to the Signal Corps. The regulation varied in wording from year to year but all variations stressed that at least one-third of an officer's time in service be spent with a "troop unit." Regulations in succeeding years tended to be more complex and legalistic as challenges to the policy grew in the officer ranks, and after 1914, included all officers in the grade of colonel or lower. The regulation required an officer to serve troop duty in his "arm of the service" (branch) for at least two years in any six-year period. Leave, illness, and travel time did not count towards the two required years. The Manchu Law was rigorously enforced by the General Staff and was much hated by the field forces. It was suspended during World War I and repealed by the National Defense Act of 1920. The term arose in usage comparing staff officers sent back to their regiments to bureaucrats of the Manchu dynasty ousted by revolution in China at the same time. In Beck's instance, the applicable regulation was "Article VI 'Details', Paragraph 40, Regulations for the army of the United States, 1910.)

=== Arnold and Milling ===
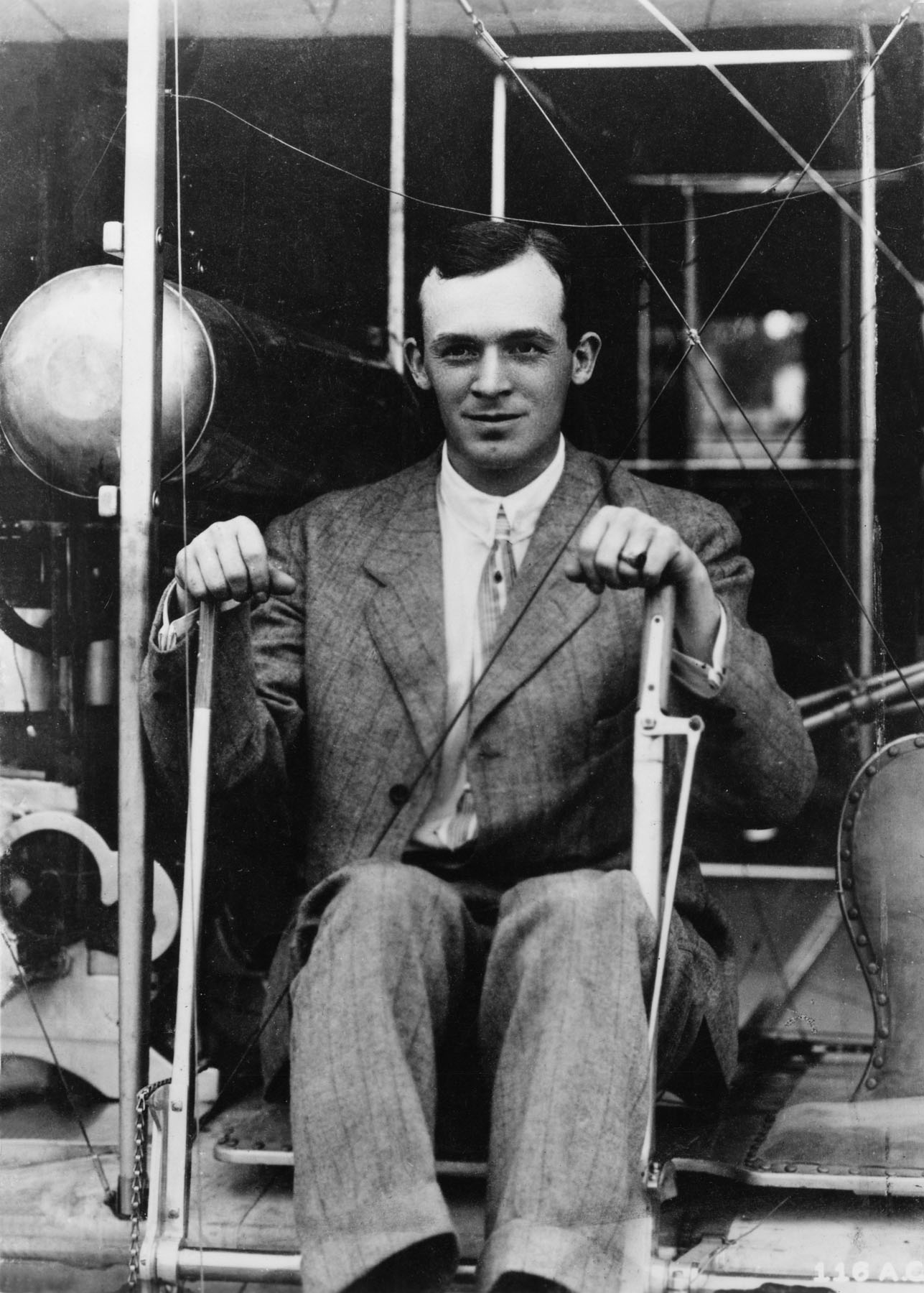
Henry H. Arnold at the controls of a Wright Model B airplane 1911

While stationed in the Philippines in 1908, 2nd Lieutenant Henry H. Arnold assisted Capt. Arthur S. Cowan (then in the Infantry) in a military mapping detail. Cowan returned to the United States, transferred to the Signal Corps, and was assigned to recruit two lieutenants to become pilots. Cowan contacted Arnold, who cabled his interest in also transferring to the Signal Corps but heard nothing in reply for two years. In 1911, relocated to Fort Jay, New York, Arnold sent a request to transfer to the Signal Corps, and on April 21, 1911, received orders detailing him and 2nd Lt. Thomas D. Milling to Dayton, Ohio, for flight instruction at the Wright brothers' aviation school. (Note: 1st Lt. Roy C. Kirtland had also been selected to train on the Wright machine with Arnold and Milling, but his flying training was delayed while he supervised selection and construction of the facility at College Park. (Cameron, p. 44)) Beginning instruction on May 3, Milling had soloed on May 8 after two hours of flight time while Arnold made his first solo flight May 13 after three hours and forty-eight minutes of flying lessons.

In June, he and Milling completed their instruction and were sent to College Park, Maryland, as the Army's first flight instructors, on June 14. Two Wright B airplanes were available for use in instruction when S.C. No. 4 was delivered five days later and joined S.C. No. 3, newly arrived from Texas. The school officially opened on July 3, 1911, and taught ten students, including two members of the National Guard (Note: Pfc. Beckwith Havens of New York, FAI Certificate N. 127; and Lt. Col. Charles B. Winder of Ohio, FAI Cert. No. 130. (Hennessy, p. 246)) and Chandler, who had been assigned to command the school and division again after graduation from the Signal School. (Note: Chandler's training under Arnold was minimal, and he actually earned his qualification flying with Orville Wright in Dayton at the end of the summer of 1911. (Cameron 1999, pp. 33–34)) S.C. No. 2, repaired and returned to service, (Note: S.C. No. 2 was involved in another fatal accident on May 9, 1913, in which 1st Lt. Joseph D. Park was killed near Santa Ana, California. The cause of that accident was judged as pilot error (attempting to take off in fog, Park flew into a tree) and S.C. No. 2 was again repaired. It continued in service until permanently grounded with all other pusher airplanes in 1914. (Hennessy 1958, p. 88)) was joined at the end of July by S.C. No. 6, a new Curtiss E "scout", (Note: The 4-cylinder engine that came with the two-seat S.C. No. 6 was swapped with the more powerful 8-cylinder engine that had been installed on the single-seat S.C. No. 2 when it was repaired. S.C. No 2 was then used a training plane for beginner pilots. (Hennessey, p. 50)) and Milling became the only aviator able to master the significantly different flight controls of each type. A split developed between the "Wright pilots" and the "Curtiss pilots" that was not resolved until the Wright machines were phased out in 1914 for safety reasons. (Note: Because the Wright airplanes were equipped with only a single warp (rudder control) lever between the pilot seats, the arrangement also produced "right seat pilots" and "left seat pilots" until 1912, when dual controls were introduced. Lahm and Humphreys, as an example, flew with each other to gain "left seat" experience for instructing purposes. (Cameron 1999, pp. 25, 45))

Milling won the Tri-State Biplane Race in a Wright B against a field of experienced fliers, flying a course from Boston, Massachusetts, to Nashua, New Hampshire, to Worcester, Massachusetts, to Providence, Rhode Island and back to Boston, a total of 175 miles, without the use of a compass. It was also his first night flight, with several large bonfires providing guidance to the landing field.

Arnold set an altitude record of 3,260 ft (990 m) on July 7, 1911, and twice broke it. In August, he experienced his first crash, trying to take off from a farm field after getting lost. At the end of the November the school disassembled its four aircraft and moved to Augusta, Georgia, for the winter, flying from a leased farm. One of its students, Lt. Col. Charles B. Winder of Ohio, was the first National Guard officer to complete flying training and receive an F.A.I. certificate in the spring of 1912. (Note: The Army pilots were not happy training Winder, however. The cost of the training was paid from the Aeronautical Division's limited funds, not by the State of Ohio; pilot training would have been provided by the manufacturer when the state purchased an aircraft; and Winder immediately put his certificate to private commercial use by advertising himself as a barn-stormer. This last point seems to have been the major irritant, since no similar criticism is documented against Private Havens of New York, who was both a salesman for Glenn Curtiss and a member of his exhibition team. "Becky" Havens undertook the training to enable him to fly for the New York Guard during its 1912 summer maneuvers. (Cameron, pp. 48–49))

Arnold accepted delivery of the Army's first tractor plane (with a propeller and engine mounted on the front) on June 26, 1912, but crashed into the bay at Plymouth, Massachusetts, during takeoff. Arnold began to develop a phobia about flying, intensified by the fatal crashes of the Wright Company instructor who taught him, Arthur L. Welsh on June 12, and an academy classmate of Arnold's, 2d Lt. Lewis Rockwell, on September 18, 1912, both in the new Wright C "speed scouts".

In October 1912, Arnold and Milling were sent to Fort Riley, Kansas, to experiment with spotting for the field artillery. On November 5, Arnold's Wright C stalled, went into a spin, and he narrowly avoided a fatal crash. He immediately and voluntarily grounded himself, then returned to the Infantry in 1913 after closing down the school at College Park, which was discontinued in favor of one with favorable flying conditions year-round on North Island at San Diego, California, later named Rockwell Field in 1917 in memory of Arnold's classmate.

== Appropriations, growth, and "incipient mutiny" ==
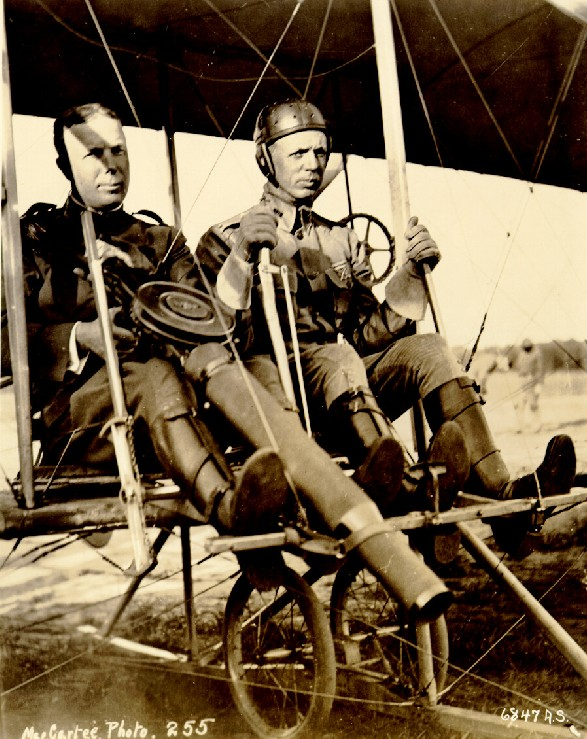
Captain Charles Chandler (with prototype Lewis Gun) and Lt. Roy Kirtland in a Wright Model B Flyer after the first successful firing of a machine-gun from an aeroplane on June 7, 1912.

In 1911, the Aeronautical Division received its first direct appropriation from Congress for aviation ($125,000 for Fiscal Year 1912, (Note: $2.9M in 2012) half of what was proposed), and added five airplanes to its inventory. In addition to S.C.s 2, 3, 4, and 6, a Wright B was ordered to be built under license by Burgess Company and Curtis as its "Model F" (S.C. No. 5). A sixth aircraft, a Wright B Flyer designated S.C. No. 7, was assembled at Fort McKinley in the Philippines and used by Lahm to make the first flight of an American military airplane outside the continental United States on March 21, 1912. (Note: A third school was established at Fort Kamehameha in Hawaii by 1st Lt. Harold Geiger in July 1913, using S.C. 8 and 21, but trained no students after preliminary flying was suspended in September because of treacherous winds. The aircraft went into storage in November. The following year the engines were shipped back to the United States, Geiger and his detachment were sent home, and the two aircraft were sold at auction for a combined total of $450.)

Rules of the Fédération Aéronautique Internationale (FAI) were adopted, including standards for the certification of pilots, and Arnold and Milling became the first two Army pilots to be FAI certified. On February 23, 1912, the U.S. Army established its own military aviator rating and issued the first five (of 24) to Arnold, Chandler, Milling, Beck, and Foulois in July 1912.

In February 1912, recognizing a need for specialized aircraft in field service, the Aeronautical Division drew up its first new specifications for aircraft since 1907, creating a "Scout" classification for a two-man, slow speed, tactical reconnaissance airplane; and "Speed Scout", for a lighter, faster, one-man airplane for strategic (longer ranged) reconnaissance. In May 1912, the division purchased its first Speed Scout, a Wright C. The aircraft crashed during its acceptance trials on June 11 at College Park, killing 2nd Lt. Leighton W. Hazelhurst, who had been among the first class of student pilots, and Arthur L. Welsh, the Wright Company instructor who had taught Arnold to fly. Arnold himself was flying a Wright C (S.C. No. 10) in November 1912 at Fort Riley, Kansas, when he was nearly killed. (Note: S.C. No. 10 crashed on February 9, 1914, killing 1st Lt. Henry B. Post.) In total the division purchased six Wright Cs (not including the one flown by Welsh and Hazelhurst) and a Burgess Model J (a Wright C made under license), six of which crashed. This led to the grounding on February 24, 1914, of all "pusher" aircraft, including the sole Wright C survivor and a Burgess model rebuilt to Wright C standard.

In anticipation of a possible war with Mexico, Chandler, four pilots, 21 enlisted men and a detachment of Curtiss JN-3 airplanes were sent from the Aviation School's winter location at Augusta, Georgia, to Texas City, Texas, on February 28, 1913. Ultimately, eight pilots and nine airplanes trained with the 2nd Division on the Gulf Coast and San Antonio. Organized as a provisional unit on March 5, the 1st Aero Squadron became the first permanent unit of the air force on December 8, 1913. (Note: The term "squadron" was derived from cavalry terminology and was used by early military air organizations internationally. In 1913, Chief Signal Officer Scriven testified during the HR5304 hearings before Congress that "the aeroplane is an adjunct to the cavalry." When the time came to form a tactical aviation organization, planners adapted the cavalry squadron organization to their purposes. Like cavalry squadrons, the new aero squadrons were administrative and tactical units, which usually consisted of two or more elements. In England, the Royal Flying Corps formed the first two aero squadrons in May 1912. The US Army followed the British example.)

While at Texas City, the junior pilots complained directly about safety concerns to new Chief Signal Officer Brig. Gen. George P. Scriven, who had come to Texas on an inspection trip after reading adverse newspaper reports on the squadron, in effect delivering an ultimatum to Scriven that either Chandler be replaced or they would withdraw from aviation. Despite calling the incident an "incipient mutiny", Scriven relieved Chandler on April 1 and transferred him to Fort McKinley in the Philippines, replaced on an interim basis by Cowan, who was already in Texas City as the signal officer of the mobilizing 2d Division. (Note: Another historian, however, wrote that Chandler may have been deposed by the division commander, Gen. Carter, who was also in command of the Central Department, in order to hand-pick a non-aviator as his replacement (Carter's signal officer, Cowan). The inadequacy of the field at Texas City and Chandler's complaints about it were apparently the catalyst for his relief, whichever general initiated it, but the pilots viewed Chandler as a non-aviator and held him responsible for the acquisition of inadequate, underpowered and unsafe aircraft. From then forward Chandler's aviation activities were limited to ballooning. (Pool, "Military Aviation in Texas", p. 432; Heimdahl & Hurley 1997, p. 30) In September, Lt. Col. Samuel Reber—a former balloonist and influential member of the Aero Club of America—became the new head of the Aeronautical Division. (Note: Reber had arranged for the first firing of a weapon (a rifle) from a flying airplane by Lt. Jacob E. Fickel on August 20, 1910.) Both Cowan and Reber were non-aviators, causing further friction with the pilots and creating a permanent consensus among them that only an aviator was qualified to command flying units. When the 1st Aero Squadron joined the Curtiss airplanes at North Island in June, (Note: College Park was abandoned in June 1913 at the expiration of the lease, despite congressional pressure to buy it, because the cost of purchasing the property ($400,000) was considered exorbitant by Secretary of War Henry L. Stimson. Arnold supervised the closing of the facility as his final task with the Aeronautical Division. (Heimdahl & Hurley 1997, p. 24)) Reber made Cowan commandant of the Aviation School at North Island, deepening the divisions.

The United States landed Marines and armed Bluejackets in the Mexican city of Veracruz on April 21, 1914. By April 24 they had completely occupied the city after severe fighting and were provided reconnaissance support by five Navy seaplanes assigned to the United States Atlantic Fleet. Two days later, to reinforce the Navy's aviation detachment, Foulois and four pilots of the 1st Aero Squadron, soon designated the squadron's 1st Company, crated their three Burgess H tractors and shipped them by rail to Fort Crockett at Galveston, leaving only two aircraft and five pilots in San Diego. 1st Company was itself reinforced by six new pilots but never uncrated their airplanes and left Texas on July 13, 1914.

=== Expansion of the aviation service ===
Beck was possibly the first advocate of an air service separate from the Army ground forces. In 1912 Beck authored an article for the Infantry Journal entitled, "Military Aviation in America: Its Needs", promoting the concept of an independent air force with its own missions. After he returned to the Infantry, he continued to lobby friends in Congress to return to aviation. In February 1913, Representative James Hay (Democrat-Virginia) introduced a bill intended to transfer aviation from the Signal Corps to the line of the Army as a semi-autonomous "Air Corps". The bill was considered too radical and died in committee, but when the 1913 appropriations bill included many of its provisions, Hay offered a revised bill in May, HR5304 "An Act to Increase the Efficiency in the Aviation Service". Hearings were held on the new bill in August 1913. Beck appeared to testify on behalf of the bill, the only officer to do so, and was opposed by Major Billy Mitchell, representing the General Staff, and Foulois, Arnold, and Milling representing the Signal Corps. That bill had its original language expunged and was written to become the enabling legislation for the Aviation Section, Signal Corps on 18 July 1914.

Appropriations for aviation fell to $100,000, in part because the Signal Corps had spent only $40,000 of the Fiscal Year 1912 funding. However, as a result of the high number of fatalities, flight pay (35% increase above base pay) and accelerated promotion for pilots were approved by Congress on March 3, 1913, in the appropriations legislation and the Aeronautical Division grew from 14 to 18 pilots. The Army Air Forces Statistical Digest (World War II) listed the strength of the division at 51 officers and men on November 1, 1912, and 114 on September 30, 1913. Statistics compiled for the HR5304 hearings showed that United States ranked 14th in expenditures among the nations with air services.

In the following year, Congress increased the size and prestige of Signal Corps aviation when it established the Aviation Section, with the Aeronautical Division continued as its headquarters component issuing orders in the name of the Chief Signal Officer. Reber became chief of the section and was promoted to lieutenant colonel, delegating the duties of head of the Aeronautical Division to another non-aviator, Major Edgar Russel, senior instructor and assistant commandant of the Signal School. (Note: Russel eventually became Chief Signal Officer of the AEF during World War I and a major general. Russel Hall, the headquarters building at Fort Monmouth, is named for him.) In February 1917 the Aeronautical Division was one of three divisions in the Office of the Chief Signal Officer (OCSO) comprising the Aviation Section, the others being the Administrative Division and Engineering Division. On October 1, 1917, during World War I, the Aeronautical Division was renamed the Air Division and was abolished altogether by the War Department on April 24, 1918.

Between August 1, 1908, and June 30, 1914, the Signal Corps spent $430,000 on aeronautics, (Note: Approximately $10,000,000 in 2012) funding the purchase of 30 aircraft and the building of a 31st (S.C. No. 23) from spare parts. (Note: The manufacturers delivered 32 airplanes, but two crashed before acceptance. One (the Wright C Scout S.C. 10) was assigned a number before acceptance that was duplicated by its replacement, but the other, the Burgess F intended to be S.C. No. 5, was not. The leased Collier Model B was not assigned an SC number. As noted earlier, S.C. No. 30 was not delivered until after creation of the Aviation Section.) By 1914, only nine of the surviving 23 remained in service, and two of those that were retired never flew operationally. (Note: S.C. 19 and 20 were experimental Wright D Speed Scouts never placed in service after flight acceptance flights.)

=== Aircraft of the Aeronautical Division ===
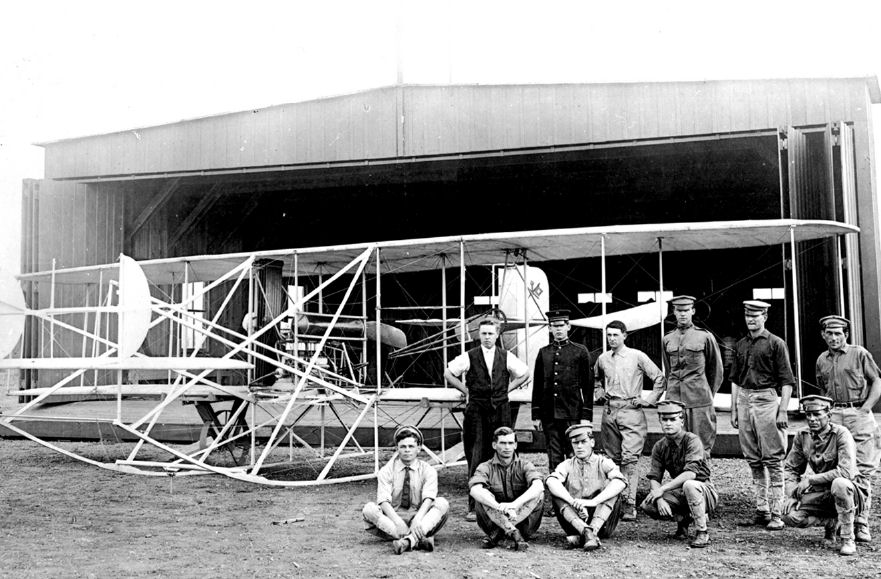
Signal Corps Plane No. 1 and crew at Fort Sam Houston, Texas, in May 1910.

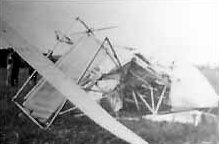
The crashed aircraft Signal Corps No. 4 September 28, 1912

SOURCES: Hennessy, The United States Army Air Arm, April 1861 to April 1917, Chapters 2–6, pp. 28–102; Warnock, "From Infant Technology to Obsolescence: the Wright Brothers' Airplane in the U.S. Army Signal Corps, 1905–1915"

S.C. No.	Date acquired	Aircraft type	Date disposed	How disposed	Notes
none	not acquired	Wright A	17 Sep 1908	destroyed	delivered 1 Sep 1908, fatal crash during acceptance trials (Selfridge)
1	2 Aug 1909	Wright A	4 May 1911	retired	donated to Smithsonian Institution
none	21 Feb 1911	Wright B	21 Jun 1911	returned to owner	leased from Robert J. Collier
2	27 Apr 1911	Curtiss D	24 Feb 1914	grounded as unsafe	2 fatal crashes (G. Kelly and Park) restored and displayed at NASM
3	27 Apr 1911	Wright B	24 Feb 1914	grounded as unsafe	
4	1 Jul 1911	Wright B	28 Sep 1912	destroyed	fatal crash (Rockwell, Scott)
5	Oct 1911	Burgess F	24 Feb 1914	grounded as unsafe	
6	27 Jul 1911	Curtiss E	24 Feb 1914	grounded as unsafe	trainer with 40 hp engine, swapped engines with S.C. No. 2
7	21 Mar 1912	Wright B	28 Aug 1913	wrecked	Philippines
8	19 Mar 1912	Curtiss E	12 Nov 1914	sold	Hawaii
9	12 Aug 1912	Burgess H	27 May 1914	wrecked	
10 (1)	not acquired	Wright C	11 Jun 1912	destroyed	fatal crash during acceptance trials (Welsh, Hazelhurst)
10 (2)	by 26 Oct 1912	Wright C	9 Feb 1914	destroyed	fatal crash (Post)
11	3 Oct 1912	Wright C	8 Jul 1913	destroyed	fatal crash (Call)
12	by Nov 1912	Wright C	14 Nov 1913	destroyed	fatal crash Philippines (Rich)
13	21 May 1913	Wright C	17 Sep 1913	destroyed	Philippines
14	by 26 Oct 1912	Wright C	24 Nov 1913	destroyed	fatal crash (Ellington, H. Kelly)
15	27 Nov 1912	Curtiss F	8 Apr 1913	condemned	fatal crash (R. Chandler)
16	22 Nov 1912	Wright C	24 Feb 1914	grounded as unsafe	
17	Jan 1913	Burgess I	12 Jan 1915	destroyed	Philippines
18	Jan 1913	Burgess J	4 Sep 1913	destroyed	fatal crash (Love)
19	3 May 1913	Wright D	24 Feb 1914	grounded as unsafe	experimental
20	6 Jun 1913	Wright D	2 Jun 1914	retired	experimental
21	28 Aug 1913	Curtiss G	12 Nov 1914	sold	Hawaii
22	1 Dec 1913	Curtiss G	unk date	unk	
23	21 Oct 1913	Curtiss E	24 Feb 1914	grounded as unsafe	built in San Diego from spare parts
24	Nov 1913	Burgess H	unk date	unk	
25	Nov 1913	Burgess H	unk date	unk	
26	Jan 1914	Burgess H	20 Aug 1915	condemned	sold 1916
27	15 May 1914	Burgess H	25 Aug 1915	condemned	sold 1916
28	25 May 1914	Burgess H	25 Aug 1915	condemned	
29	24 Jun 1914	Curtiss J	21 Dec 1914	destroyed	fatal crash (Gerstner)
31	2 Jul 1914	Martin T	Oct 1916	condemned	Damaged beyond repair in a ground accident on 20 April 1915

== Heads of the Aeronautical Division ==
The executive head of the Aeronautical Division had no official title between 1907 and 1914 but was usually referred to as the officer in charge (OIC). The history of assignments of heads of the division in official orders is murky and confused between 1908 and 1916. The four recognized by the USAF as the OICs of the division during this period, and thus as "head" of its progenitor arm, are denoted by a bullet point. All others are on lists in official studies published by the Office of Air Force History or its successor AFHRA. After July 18, 1914, the division was a part of an aviation section authorized by statute, with a Chief of Division who as head of the headquarters component also exercised control of the section.

August 1, 1907, to July 18, 1914:

- Captain Charles deForest Chandler (August 1, 1907 – May 13, 1908)

1st Lt. Frank P. Lahm (May 14, 1908 – December 1909)*
Unknown (December 1909 – June 30, 1910)

- Capt. Arthur S. Cowan (July 1, 1910 – June 19, 1911)
- Capt. Charles deForest Chandler (June 20, 1911 – April 1, 1913)**

2nd Lt. Henry H. Arnold (September 18, 1912 – December 14, 1912) (Note: If Arnold were officially recognized, he would have twice commanded U.S. military aviation, once as a second lieutenant and once as a general of the army.)
Maj. Edgar Russel (December 15, 1912 – September 9, 1913)

- Lt. Col. Samuel Reber (September 10, 1913 – July 17, 1914; Chief of Division July 18, 1914 – May 5, 1916)

Acting Chief of Division (Note: The United States Senate passed S.J. Resolution 65 on March 16, 1916, calling for an investigation of malfeasance in the Aviation Section, causing the immediate appointment of an acting head of the division/section. See "The Goodier court-martial" at Aviation Section, U.S. Signal Corps)
Capt. George S. Gibbs (March 17, 1916 – April 2, 1916)
Major Billy Mitchell (April 3, 1916– May 20, 1916)

Chiefs of Division (and Aviation Section head), 1916–1918
Lt. Col. George O. Squier (May 20, 1916 – February 18, 1917)
Lt. Col. John B. Bennet (February 19, 1917 – July 29, 1917)
Maj. Benjamin D. Foulois (July 30, 1917 – November 5, 1917)
Brig. Gen. Alexander L. Dade (November 5, 1917 – February 14, 1918) (Note: Dade, a colonel of cavalry, became school commander of the Signal Corps Aviation School on April 11, 1917, when Col. William A. Glassford reached the mandatory retirement age of 64. Glassford had purchased the General Myer and commanded the first Signal Corps War Balloon Company in 1894 at Fort Logan. Dade was promoted to temporary general of the Signal Corps on December 17, with a date of rank of October 29, and appointed to command the Air Division, and by seniority, the Aviation Section.)
Col. Laurence Brown (February 28, 1918 – April 24, 1918)

*The Air Force does not acknowledge Lahm as OIC of the Aeronautical Division between 1908 and 1910. However, Chandler's biography and Hennessy's history (page 14) indicate that from May 1908 to July 1910 Chandler was commander of the Signal Corps Balloon Station at Fort Omaha, Nebraska. Also, Lahm was mandatorily returned to the Cavalry in late 1909, and no replacement is given, although if one was assigned, it was likely Foulois.

**Chandler was also Chief of the Aviation School and commander of the 1st Provisional Aero Squadron when those organizations were active. He was relieved of duty on April 1, 1913, and transferred to the Philippines. Capt. Cowan replaced him in command of the 1st Aero Squadron and as acting OIC of the Aeronautical Division.

== Military aviation pioneers with the Aeronautical Division ==
- 1st Lt. Henry H. Arnold, 29th Infantry – second rated Military Aviator (July 5, 1912)
- Capt. Paul W. Beck, Signal Corps – first nominal head of an operational aviation unit in 1911–12, first advocate of a separate air service
- 2d Lt. Lewis H. Brereton, Coast Artillery Corps – only member to retire (1948) as part of USAF
- Cpl. Vernon L. Burge, Signal Corps – first FAI certified enlisted pilot (June 14, 1912)
- Capt. Charles deF. Chandler, Signal Corps – balloonist, twice head of the Aeronautical Division, and third rated pilot (July 5, 1912)
- 1st Lt. Benjamin D. Foulois, Signal Corps – third solo pilot, first Army instructor pilot
- 2d Lt Leighton W. Hazelhurst, 17th Infantry – second student pilot fatality (June 11, 1912)
- 2d Lt. Frederick E. Humphreys, Corps of Engineers – first to solo in a military aircraft (October 26, 1909)
- 2d Lt. George E. M. Kelly, 30th infantry – first student and pilot fatality (May 10, 1911)
- 1st Lt. Frank P. Lahm, 6th Cavalry – second solo pilot, first licensed military pilot, and first Army aviator overseas
- 2d Lt. Moss L. Love, Signal Corps – first pilot trained overseas (killed September 4, 1913)
- Sgt. Herbert L. Marcus, US Signal Corps, circa 1911 -1914. aircraft mechanic, flew with Lt. Townsend Dodd in Burgess H tractor biplane, setting American distance (245 miles) and duration (2hr,43 min.) record on Feb.14,1914.
- 1st Lt. Thomas DeW. Milling, 15th Cavalry – first rated Military Aviator (July 5, 1912)
- 2d Lt. C. Perry Rich, Philippine Scouts – first overseas fatality (November 14, 1913)
- 2d Lt. Lewis C. Rockwell, 10th Infantry – first licensed pilot fatality (September 18, 1912)
- Corp. Frank S. Scott, Signal Corps – first enlisted and second passenger fatality (September 18, 1912)
- 1st Lt. Thomas E. Selfridge, Jr., 1st Field Artillery – first Army officer to learn to fly, first airplane fatality (September 17, 1908)
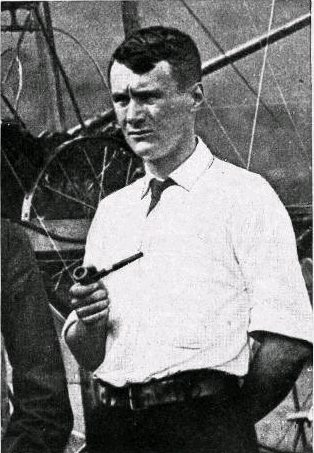
Lt. Selfridge

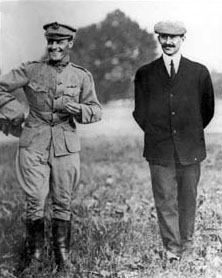
Lt. Foulois and Orville Wright 1909

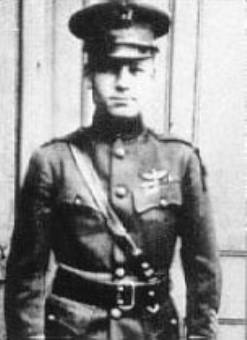
Thomas Dewitt Milling

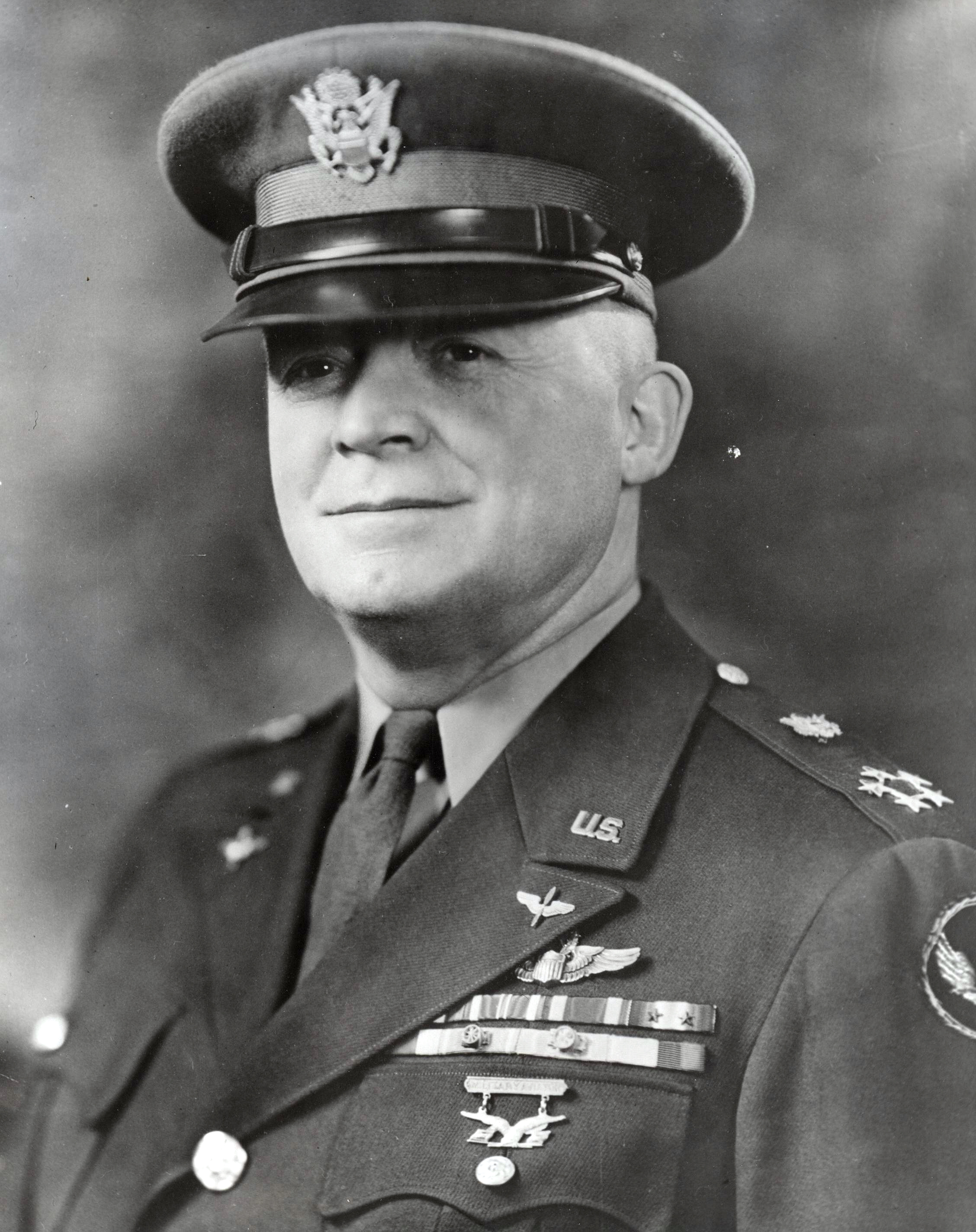
Henry "Hap" Arnold

== See also ==
- Aviation Section, U.S. Signal Corps

== Lineage of the United States Air Force ==
- Aeronautical Division, Signal Corps August 1, 1907 – July 18, 1914
- Aviation Section, Signal Corps July 18, 1914 – May 20, 1918
- Division of Military Aeronautics May 20, 1918 – May 24, 1918
- Air Service, United States Army May 24, 1918 – July 2, 1926
- United States Army Air Corps July 2, 1926 – June 20, 1941
- United States Army Air Forces June 20, 1941 – September 18, 1947
- United States Air Force September 18, 1947 – present

== Notes ==
=== Citations ===
Preceded by Created	Aeronautical Division, Signal Corps; 1907–1914	Succeeded by Aviation Section, Signal Corps
