= Vernon Burge =

American aviation pioneer

Vernon Lee Burge
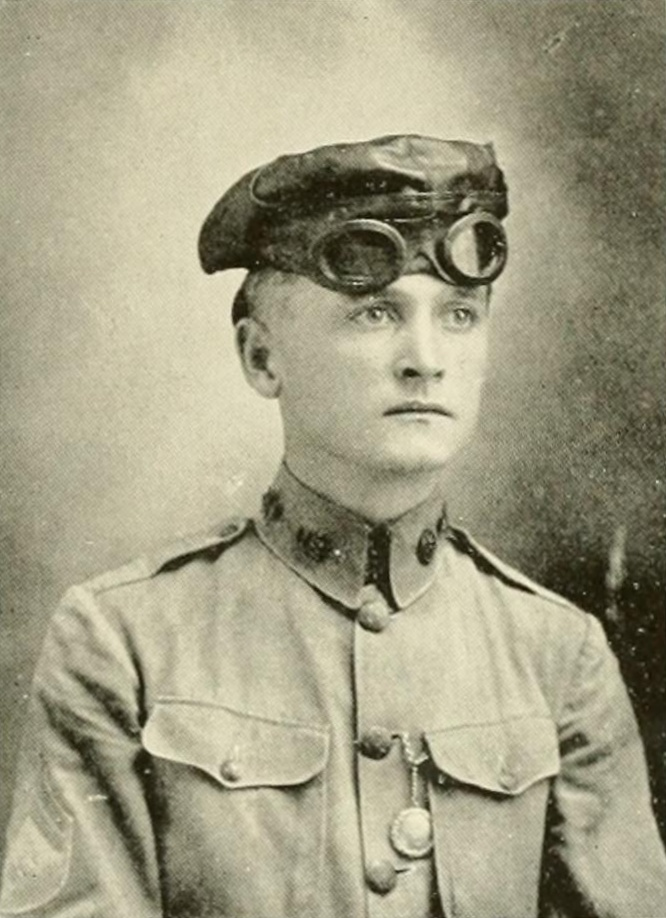
- Vernon Burge
- Born: November 29, 1888
- Died: September 6, 1971 (aged 82)
- Military career
- Allegiance: United States
- Branch: Aeronautical Division, U.S. Signal Corps; Aviation Section, U.S. Signal Corps; U.S. Army Air Service; U.S. Army Air Corps
- Service years: 1907–1942
- Rank: Colonel
- Commands: 6th Bombardment Group

Vernon Lee Burge (November 29, 1888 – September 6, 1971) was an aviation pioneer. He was the first American enlisted man to be certified as a military pilot. After ten years as an enlisted man, Burge was commissioned during World War I and served the next 25 years as an officer.

== Biography ==
He was born on November 29, 1888.

In the autumn of 1907, Private First Class Vernon Burge was assigned to Fort Myer, Virginia, to join the newly formed Aeronautical Division, U.S. Signal Corps under Captain Charles deForest Chandler. At that time, the Aeronautical Division was composed of only three officers, ten enlisted men and one female civilian clerk. There was to have been an eleventh enlisted man, but he deserted after learning of his assignment. At first, the unit trained in the military use of balloons.

While Burge was stationed there in August 1909, the Wright Brothers brought to Fort Myer the first fixed-wing aircraft purchased by the U.S. Army, a variant of the Wright Model A termed the Wright Military Flyer and designated by the Signal Corps as "Signal Corps (S.C.) No. 1". Burge worked as a member of the ground crew for the aircraft, and trained in its technology.

On December 16, 1909, Burge transferred to Company H, Signal Corps, traveling in February 1910 to Fort Sam Houston, Texas to serve under Lieutenant Benjamin Foulois as one of ten enlisted mechanics repairing the frequently damaged S.C. No. 1. Along with Glenn Madole and a civilian mechanic in August 1910, Burge contrived a way to fasten three wheels to the aircraft so that its skids would not be damaged as much upon landing. Crude as it was, this was the first tricycle landing gear on an aircraft. Foulois' initial reaction was negative: "One of the unpleasant features of landing on wheels is the difficulty experienced in stopping the machine." However, the wheels saved the aircraft from more frequent repair, and subsequent aircraft models incorporated wheels.

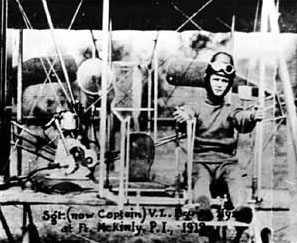
Burge at Fort William McKinley in the Philippines at the controls of a Wright B Flyer

On December 11, 1911, the Army shipped S.C. No. 7, a Wright Model B, and spare parts to enable six months of operations to Fort William McKinley in the Philippines. Corporal Burge and Private Kenneth L. Kintzel accompanied the aeroplane as mechanicians and were joined by five Army mechanics already in Manila. S.C. No. 7, equipped with floats as a seaplane, was assembled and flown for the first time on March 21, 1912.

1st Lt. Frank P. Lahm, who had been the Army's first passenger on the Wright Military Flyer in 1909, rejoined the 7th Cavalry in the Philippines in November 1911 and was detailed to open the Philippine Air School in March 1912 by Chief Signal officer of the Philippine Department, Lt. Col. William A. Glassford. Although two officers were to be instructed, only one (1st Lt. Moss L. Love) volunteered for the dangerous duty, and Glassford approved Burge's request for pilot training without waiting for approval from the Chief of Signal in Washington, D.C.

Burge met the requirements of the Fédération Aéronautique Internationale (FAI) on June 14, 1912, and received FAI aviation certificate No. 154 (Love received No. 155 on June 28). The Chief of Signal later disapproved the training of enlisted men as pilots, but Burge's certification as a pilot was already a fact. He reversed himself and accepted Burge's certification on August 14, 1912, and promoted him to sergeant. He was also rated a master signal electrician.

=== Officer ===
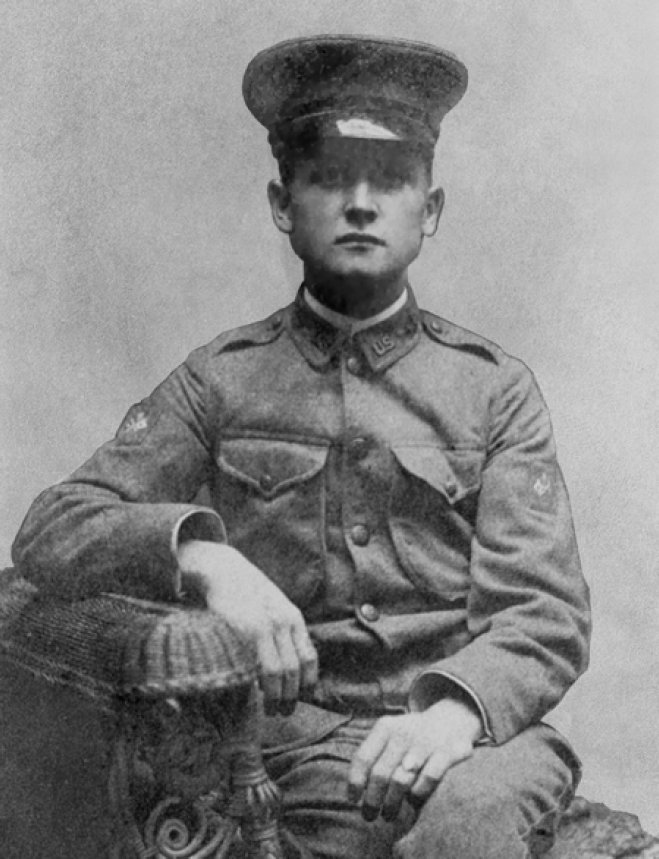
Army portrait

On June 26, 1917, Burge was first commissioned a second lieutenant from a vacancy in the 53rd Infantry, and a first lieutenant of the 40th Infantry, both of the Regular Army, with the service number O-5511. On August 5, 1917, as part of a large influx of mid-career officers detailed to the Aviation Section, U.S. Signal Corps in its wartime expansion, Burge received temporary promotion to captain, Signal Corps. In April 1919 he was assigned to the 24th Infantry and promoted in the permanent establishment to captain and sent back to the 1st Aero Squadron where, as tensions rose in the U.S. near the end of the Mexican Revolution, he took part in patrol flights along the Mexico – United States border in 1919. Burge took photographs of the men and aircraft of 1st Aero Squadron. On July 1, 1920, when the Army Reorganization Act established the Air Service as a combat arm of the Army, Burge transferred in grade to the new branch.

In the spring of 1922, Burge served in Oklahoma City on an Army Board whose purpose was to investigate the shooting death of Lieutenant Colonel Paul W. Beck. The board raised serious questions about the actions of Judge Jean P. Day who said he had only intended to strike Beck with his pistol, not shoot him. The board determined that Beck had "died in the line of duty."

During the school year 1934–1935, Burge attended the Air Corps Tactical School at the rank of major.

Burge commanded the 2nd Observation Squadron in the Philippines from June 1923 to April 1925. He also held a number of service squadron commands, including the 68th S.S. in 1922-23, the 61st S.S. from 1925 to 1929, and again 1935-36, and the 66th S.S. from 1930 to 1932.

For two months beginning in June 1939, Lt. Col. Burge served in the Panama Canal Zone at France Field as commander of the 6th Bombardment Group, and the base Headquarters and 16th Air Base Squadron. Burge retired as a colonel on January 31, 1942, and lived in San Antonio, Texas.

He died on September 6, 1971, at age 82. He was buried in Fort Sam Houston National Cemetery.

== See also ==
- Aviation history
