= Thomas D. Milling =

United States Air Force general (1887–1960)

Thomas DeWitt Milling
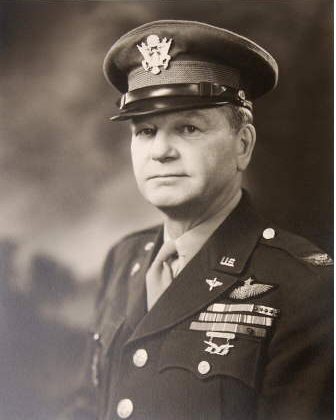
- Thomas DeWitt Milling as a colonel
- Born: July 31, 1887; Winnfield, Louisiana
- Died: November 26, 1960 (aged 73); Walter Reed Hospital
- Military career
- Allegiance: United States of America
- Branch: United States Army
- Service years: 1909–1933; 1942–1946
- Rank: Brigadier General
- Conflicts: World War I World War II
- Awards: Distinguished Service Medal; Legion of Merit; Officer of the Order of the British Empire; Officer of the Order of Leopold (Belgium); Legion d'Honneur (France)

Thomas DeWitt Milling (July 31, 1887 – November 26, 1960) was a pioneer of military aviation and a brigadier general in the U.S. Army Air Corps. He was the first rated pilot in the history of the United States Air Force.

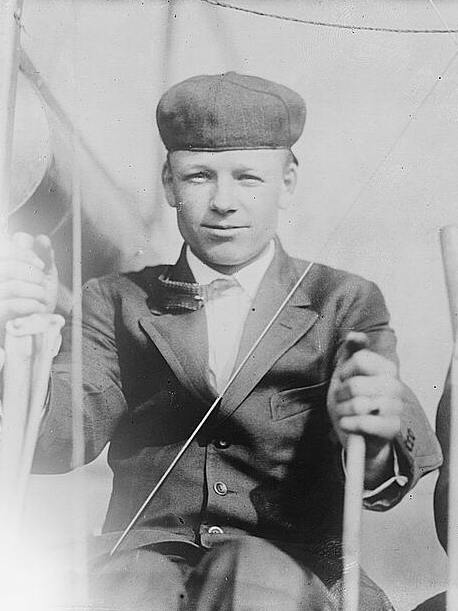
Milling sitting at the controls of a biplane before 1913

He received his flight training from the Wright Brothers and was awarded Fédération Aéronautique Internationale (FAI) pilot certificate No. 30 on July 6, 1911. Although Milling was not the first U.S. Army aviator, he was the first to receive Military Aviator Certificate No. 1 on July 5, 1912. Milling also received the first badge awarded to an American military aviator in October 1913.

== Background and education ==
Milling was born to Judge Robert E. Milling and the former Ida Roberts in Winnfield, Louisiana, the seat of Winn Parish, and attended public schools in Franklin, the seat of St. Mary Parish. He was appointed a cadet in the United States Military Academy on June 15, 1905. He graduated on June 11, 1909, with the degree of Bachelor of Science and commissioned a second lieutenant, Cavalry.

== Aviation pioneer ==
Milling reported to the 15th Cavalry at Fort Leavenworth, Kansas, in September 1909 but his tour of duty was cut short when War Department Special Order 95, dated April 21, 1911, assigned Milling and 2d Lt. Henry H. Arnold to "aeronautical duty with the Signal Corps," and instructed them to "proceed to Dayton, Ohio, for the purpose of undergoing a course of instruction in operating the Wright airplane."

"Up to this time the Army had no prescribed tests for qualification as an airplane pilot. Now it adopted the FAI regulations and required all army fliers to pass these tests in order to be rated as pilots. All qualification certificates for airplane, airship, and balloon pilots were issued by the Aero Club of America, the only U.S. representative for the FAI." (from the National Museum of the United States Air Force, Centenniel of Flight exhibition)

Milling began his training on May 3, 1911, under the tutelage of Wright instructor Cliff Turpin. However the next day Orville Wright took an interest in Milling and went up with him. On May 8, after just one hour and fifty-four minutes of flying time, Wright authorized Milling to go up alone, and he made his first solo flight. Milling landed in an unorthodox downward spiral, alarming onlookers that included Wright, Turpin, and Arnold, but appeared in control the entire time, and the Wrights included a modified maneuver in future instruction. Milling flew daily for six weeks, except in bad weather, mastering takeoffs, landings, turns, and rudimentary maneuvers.

After completing their training, Milling and Arnold reported to College Park, Maryland, detailed to the Aeronautical Division, U.S. Signal Corps to instruct the commander of the division flight school, Captain Charles DeForest Chandler, who had only balloon experience, and his adjutant, 1st Lt. Roy C. Kirtland, in operating the Wright airplane. The school officially opened on July 3, 1911, and taught ten students, including two members of the National Guard.

The Army, in addition to the Wright biplane, had also purchased an aircraft manufactured by Glenn Curtiss, which the "Provisional Aero Company" flew at Fort Sam Houston, Texas, until a fatal crash in May, 1911 resulted in the banning of further flights there. The company relocated to College Park, where Milling became the only aviator able to master the significantly different flight controls of each type.

Only a few months after learning to fly, Milling entered and won the Tri-State Biplane Race against a field of experienced fliers. Flying a course that went from Boston, Massachusetts to Nashua, New Hampshire to Worcester, Massachusetts to Providence, Rhode Island and back to Boston, a total of 175 miles, the cross-country race was the longest of its era. Milling flew it in a Wright B Flyer without the use of a compass. It was also his first night flight, with several large bonfires providing guidance to the landing field.

On July 5, 1912, Milling, along with Arnold and Chandler, received the first Military Aviator rating authorized by the War Department. On May 2, 1913, he was recognized by General Order 39 as one of the original 24 military aviators, and on October 15, 1913, he and Chandler received the first badges awarded to wear on the uniform.

In 1915, he and Byron Q. Jones were the first army aviators to perform an aerial combat reconnaissance mission.

== Career assignments ==
Milling's instructor assignments included the Signals Corps Aviation School at Augusta, Georgia; training at Texas City, Texas, in anticipation of war with Mexico; and San Diego, California, until July 1913. After duty with the Office of the Chief Signal Officer of the Army in Washington, D.C., from July to November 1913, Milling was sent to Europe as an observer.

On July 23, 1914, Milling was promoted to first lieutenant and served again as a flying instructor, at Galveston, Texas, and San Diego. In August 1914, Milling accompanied the U.S. Relief Commission to Europe to assist in the repatriation of Americans stranded in war-torn Europe. In March 1916, he was again detailed to the Office of the Chief Signal Officer and promoted twice (to captain July 31, 1916, and to lieutenant colonel August 5, 1917). In August 1917, he was placed in charge of Air Service Training in Europe, and in October 1918 succeeded Billy Mitchell as chief of the Air Service of the U.S. First Army, American Expeditionary Force, and promoted to colonel.

Milling returned from France in January 1919 and served in a variety of assignments for the next seven years: assistant chief, Training and Operations Group, including president of a board to determine all aerial laws, rules and regulations, (January 1919 to June 1920); officer in charge, Air Service Field Officers' School, Langley Field, Virginia (July 1920 to June 1922); assistant commandant, Air Service Tactical School, Langley Field (June 1922 to January 1925); operations officer, Second Bombardment Wing, Langley Field (January to June 1925); and Air Service Engineering School, McCook Field, Dayton, Ohio, completing the course in August 1926.

Milling then attended the Command and General Staff School at Fort Leavenworth. Graduating in June 1927, he was assigned to the War Plans Section, Office of Chief of the Air Corps in Washington, D.C., where his duties were mainly administrative in connection with war planning and legislation. In June 1930, Milling was sent to the Colorado National Guard in Denver, Colorado to serve as an Air Corps instructor. In September 1931, he served briefly at Rockwell Air Depot, California, then was admitted to Fitzsimons General Hospital in Aurora, Colorado, where he was a patient from October 1931 to July 31, 1933, when he retired from active duty due to poor health.

== World War II service ==
During World War II, Milling was recalled to active duty as a major on March 16, 1942, to serve on the War Department Decorations Board in Washington, D.C., and was promoted to lieutenant colonel April 27, 1942, and to colonel September 24, 1942. In December 1942, he served as the air representative on the United States Congress Joint Intelligence Sub-Committee and later was a member of the Joint Intelligence Staff in the office of the Assistant Chief of Staff, Intelligence, until December 1943, when he returned to the War Department Decorations Board, serving until March 1946. Milling again retired on July 24, 1946.

He died at Walter Reed General Hospital on November 26, 1960. Although Milling never actively served as a general officer, he was advanced on the retired list to the rank of brigadier general, with his date of rank retroactive to June 13, 1940.

General Milling has been awarded a number of decorations, including the Distinguished Service Medal; Legion of Merit; Most Excellent Order of the British Empire, degree of Honorary Officer; Officer of the Order of Leopold (Belgium); French Legion d'Honneur (Chevalier).

Milling was also a member of the Early Birds of Aviation, a celebrated group of fliers who soloed before December 17, 1916.

== Additional sources ==
- Thomas DeWitt Milling Document Collection, Biographical Note; Smithsonian National Air and Space Museum Archives
- Coffey, Thomas M., Hap: the Story of the U.S. Air Force and the Man Who Built It, General Henry H. "Hap" Arnold, Viking Press (1982)
- Nalty, Bernard C., editor, Winged Shield, Winged Sword: A History of the United States Air Force (1997), ISBN 0-16-049009-X
