= Burgess Company =

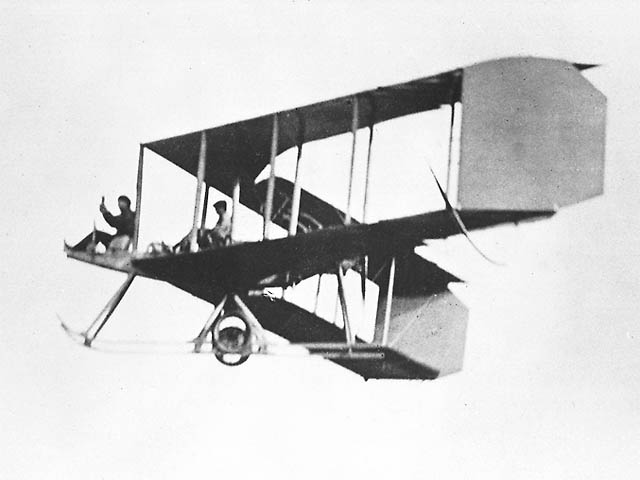
- A Burgess-Dunne, based on a previous design, the Dunne D.8
- Industry: Aerospace
- Founded: 1910; 115 years ago
- Founders: William Starling Burgess; Greely S. Curtis; Frank Henry Russell
- Defunct: 1918
- Successor: Curtiss Aeroplane and Motor Company

The Burgess Company was a U.S. airplane manufacturer between 1910 and 1918.

== History ==
The business was incorporated in 1910 as the "Burgess Company and Curtis, Inc." (after W. Starling Burgess and Greely S. Curtis, its co-founders with Frank Henry Russell). The company was an offshoot of the W. Starling Burgess Shipyard, of Marblehead, Massachusetts.

Burgess was the first licensed aircraft manufacturer in the United States. On February 1, 1911, it received a license to build Wright aircraft from the Wright Brothers, who held several key aeronautical patents. Burgess was charged licensing fees of $1000 per aircraft and $100 per exhibition flight. In 1912 Burgess fitted some of its Wright Model F airplanes with pontoons, contrary to the Wright Company's licensing provisions, which permitted only exact copies of their designs. The license agreement was terminated by mutual consent in January 1914.

In the same month, January 1914, the organization became the Burgess Company, a name change to avoid confusion with the Curtiss Aeroplane and Engine Company. Greely S. Curtis continued as Treasurer and its major shareholder. Burgess designed and flight tested most of the aircraft that were manufactured at the two plant sites in Marblehead. Curtis was the company's financial and engineering adviser and Russell, formerly the manager of the Wright Company's Dayton factory, managed their production operations. The Burgess Company was acquired on February 10, 1914, by the Curtiss Aeroplane and Motor Company. The Burgess Company then operated as a manufacturing subsidiary producing Curtiss's naval training aircraft in late 1916 and continued to produce these aircraft under the Burgess name during World War I until its main production facility was totally destroyed by fire on November 8, 1918.

The company provided seaplanes and other aircraft to the military. The first tractor configuration airplane purchased by the U.S. Army was a Burgess H (S.C. No. 9) in August 1912. In September 1913, a Burgess Model F seaplane based on a modified Wright Model B design with pontoons, was delivered to the Signal Corps for use in the Philippines to maintain a flying school. The same aircraft (S.C. No. 17) in December 1914 was the first in the Army to demonstrate two-way air-to-ground radio communications.

== Aircraft ==
Model name	First flight	Number built	Type
Herring-Burgess A	1910	5	Pusher biplane
Burgess Model B	1910	1	Pusher biplane
Burgess Model C	1910	1	Pusher biplane
Burgess Model D	1910	1	License built Curtiss Model D
Burgess Model E	1911	7	License built Grahame-White Baby
Burgess Model F	1911	~60	License built Wright Model B
Burgess Model G	N/A	0	Unbuilt modified Wright Model B
Burgess Model H	1912	6	Training biplane
Burgess Model I	1913	1	Reconnaissance floatplane
Burgess Model J Scout		1	Modified Wright Model C with curved wings
Burgess Model K	1913	1	Pusher biplane flying boat
Burgess-Dunne Model BD	1914	26	Tailless biplane
Burgess Model O Gunbus	1915	36	Pusher biplane fighter
Burgess Model S	1916	6	Biplane flying boat
Burgess Model U		1	Biplane floatplane
Burgess Twin Hydro	1917	1	Twin engine biplane floatplane
Burgess Model HT-1	1917	2	Sesquiplane floatplane tractor biplane
Burgess Model HT-2 Speed Scout		6	Experimental floatplane biplane fighter/observation airplane
Burgess Model N-9		460	License built Curtiss Model N

== See also ==
- Glenn Curtiss
- W. Starling Burgess
