= Frank S. Scott =

First enlisted American to die in an aircraft crash (1883–1912)

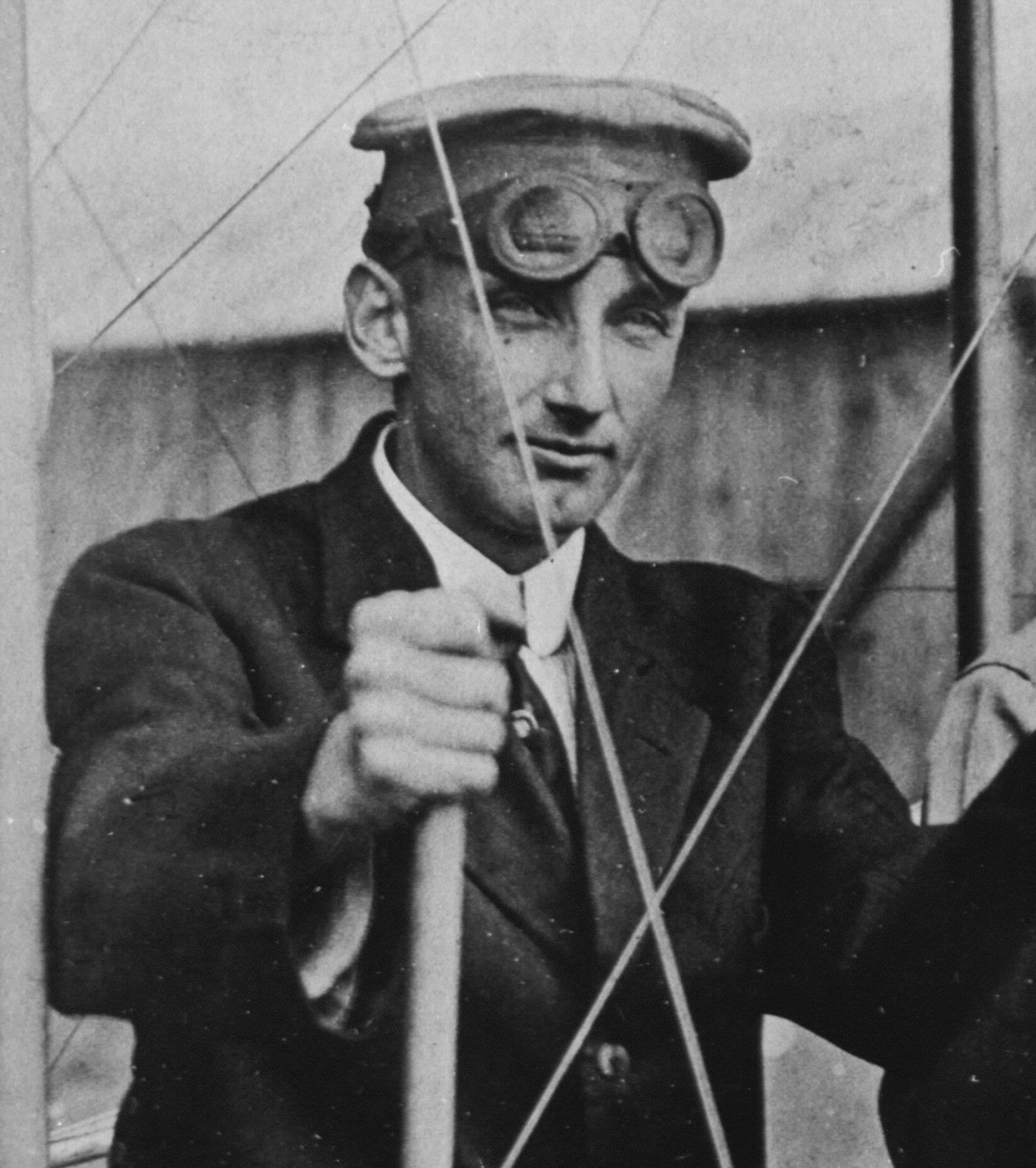
- Scott on 28 September 1912
- Born: 2 December 1883; Braddock, Pennsylvania, US
- Died: 28 September 1912 (aged 28); College Park Flying Field; College Park, Maryland, US
- Cause of death: Plane crash
- Burial place: Arlington Nat. Cemetery
- Military career
- Branch: United States Army
- Years: 1908–1912 (4.6 years)
- Rank: Corporal
- Units: Field Artillery (1908–11); Signal Corps (1911–12)

Frank S. Scott (2 December 1883 – 28 September 1912) was a United States Army corporal who died during his second enlistment, aged 28, in an aircraft crash. As the first enlisted American to die in an aircraft incident, Scott was memorialized multiple times.

== Personal life ==
Frank S. Scott was born in Braddock, Pennsylvania on 2 December 1883. He and his sister Clara were orphaned in 1889 when their parents died in the Johnstown Flood; they were thereafter raised by an aunt.

== US Army ==
Scott enlisted in the United States Army at Fort Slocum on 2 March 1908, and served with the Field Artillery Branch. In 1911, Private Scott was discharged at Fort Myer (with "excellent"-rated character) from "Battery D, 3rd Regiment, Field Artillery." The very same month, he re-enlisted with "Company G, Signal Corps."

That July, then-Corporal Scott began suffering from a lengthy unknown illness. Upon recovery, he was deemed unfit for his current duties and transferred to the Signal Corps' Aeronautical Division at College Park Flying Field in Maryland. At his new assignment, Scott discovered a penchant for mechanical engineering and was re-tasked from his duties of releasing hot air balloons to becoming chief mechanic for one of the Wright Model B biplanes assigned to the Field.

== Death ==
By 27 September, Second Lieutenant Lewis Rockwell had promised Scott an aircraft-ride on 28 September while testing for his aviator ratings. An officer had asked to be Rockwell's passenger, but since Scott weighed less (having not fully recovered from his 1911 illness), he received the coveted seat; excited about the upcoming flight, Scott joked with a visiting Captain Bernard Rome that he was just 2LT Rockwell's "ballast".

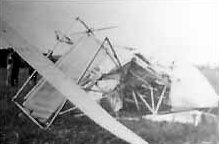
The crashed aircraft

The next day, Rockwell test-flew the plane alone to ensure proper functioning; after reaching 40 miles per hour (64 km/h) and assured that the aircraft was functioning properly, the lieutenant landed and picked up Scott. The takeoff and flight itself were uneventful as the small craft flew at an altitude of 150 feet (46 m) for about ten minutes. However, when attempting to land, the plane developed engine problems and began to dive; Rockwell stopped the plane's 30-horsepower (22 kW) engine within 30 feet (9.1 m) of the ground, but could not stop the descent and crash. Scott was dead at the scene, and Rockwell died later at Walter Reed General Hospital, having never regained consciousness. More than 300 people watched the crash.

The plane in question had been rebuilt thrice and logged over one thousand flights; it was made of wood, wire, cloth, and glue. The official incident investigation found that the plane's control wires were still intact after the crash. Coupled with eyewitness accounts, the investigatory board determined that pilot error was the cause: Rockwell misjudged the plane's altitude upon descent and could not recover from the dive.

=== Legacy ===
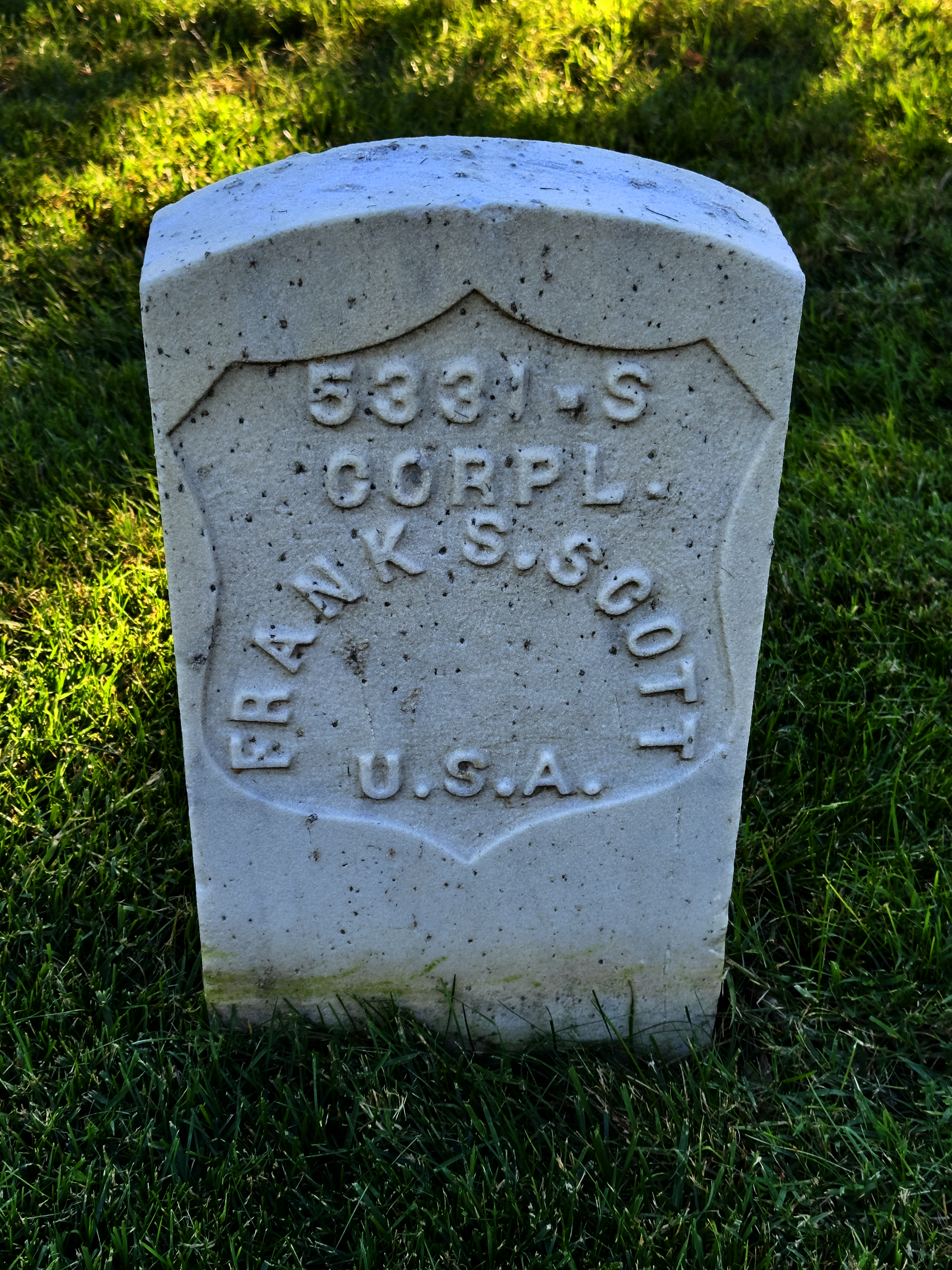
Scott's gravestone (Sep 2023)

Scott and Rockwell were buried in Arlington National Cemetery on 1 October 1912; Scott's grave is numbered 5331-5 in section 13.

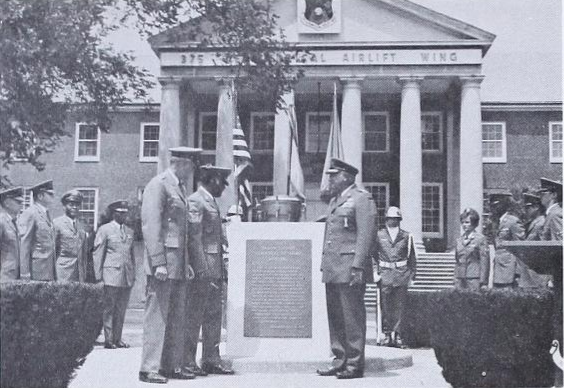
1976 memorial dedication

On 20 July 1917, in accordance with the standard procedure of naming aviation fields for those servicemembers who died "during the 'experimental' era" of aviation, Scott Field was named for the first American enlisted man to die in an aircraft accident. With Chief Master Sergeant of the Air Force Thomas N. Barnes as the guest of honor on 20 July 1976, a granite-and-bronze memorial was dedicated to Corporal Scott at the Air Force base named for him. As of May 2017, Scott Air Force Base was the only United States Air Force base named for an enlisted person.

== See also ==
- List of accidents and incidents involving military aircraft before 1925
