= Joseph Mauborgne =

United States Army general

Chief Signal Officer, U.S. Army Joseph Oswald Mauborgne
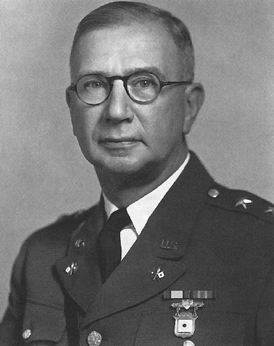
- Born: February 26, 1881; New York City, U.S.
- Died: June 7, 1971 (aged 90) Atlanta, Georgia, U.S.
- Allegiance: United States
- Branch: United States Army
- Service years: 1903–1941
- Rank: Major general
- Commands: Chief Signal Officer
- Conflicts: World War I
- Awards: Distinguished Service Medal; World War I Victory Medal; American Defense Service Medal

Joseph Oswald Mauborgne (February 26, 1881 – June 7, 1971) co-invented the one-time pad with Gilbert Vernam of Bell Labs. In 1914 he published the first recorded solution of the Playfair cipher. Mauborgne became a Major General in the United States Army, and from October 1937 to his retirement in 1941 was the Army's 12th Chief Signal Officer, in command of the Signal Corps.

== Biography ==
Mauborgne was born on February 26, 1881, in New York City to Eugene and Catherine Elizabeth McLaughlin Mauborgne. After graduating in 1901 from the College of Saint Xavier in New York, he studied fine arts until commissioned a 2d Lieutenant, Infantry, in the regular Army in 1903. Stationed in the Philippines several times at several infantry posts, Mauborgne attended the Army Signal School at Fort Leavenworth, Kansas, in 1909–1910, graduating from the Signal Officers Course, followed by a tour of duty in Washington, D.C., in the office of Chief Signal Officer Brigadier General George P. Scriven.

While stationed at Fort Riley, Kansas, in 1912, he installed a radio transmitter in an airplane and had 1st Lt. Henry H. Arnold send him the first successful air to ground radio transmission on November 2. Two years later, while in command of the radio station at Fort Mills on Corregidor, Mauborgne went up himself with 2nd Lt. Herbert A. "Bert" Dargue in a Burgess Model I seaplane to conduct a series of experimental flight tests of an airborne radio, and made the first two-way radio telegraphy between an airplane and a station on the ground on December 16, 1914. After World War I, in the 1920s and 1930s, Mauborgne pursued communication advancements in numerous research-and-development assignments, including a stint as chief of the Signal Corps Engineering and Research Division and as commander of the Signal Corps laboratory in the Bureau of Standards. During the early 1930s, Mauborgne was Signal Officer for the 9th Corps Area and later Director of the Signal Corps Aircraft Factory, Wright Field, Ohio. He attended the Army War College during its 1931–32 academic session. In 1937, as a Signal Corps officer, he used a Dictaphone to record Japanese radio signals at the Presidio of San Francisco.

As Chief of Signal, Mauborgne supported technological development and oversaw the mass production of the SCR-268 and SCR-270 Army radars. Just a few months after he retired (September 30, 1941), two Signal Corps soldiers — using an SCR-270 radar at Oahu, Hawaii, in the early morning of December 7, 1941 — spotted Japanese aircraft on their way in to attack Pearl Harbor.

In addition to his professional study, Mauborgne attended the Chicago Art Institute in 1922–1923. Returning to Washington D.C. in 1923 he continued his art studies at the Corcoran Art Gallery between 1923 and 26. Portraits and etchings produced by Mauborgne were exhibited in galleries in Washington, San Francisco, and Dayton, Ohio; acquired by the United States Military Academy, and sold to private collections.

Mauborgne reached the mandatory retirement age in October 1941 and retired near Fort Monmouth, New Jersey. Among his interests were music and violin-making, for which he won an international competition in The Hague in 1949. During his early career, Mauborgne was a recognized marksman, on the "Distinguished Shooters" list of the Civilian Marksmanship Program.

In December 1907, Mauborgne married Katherine Hale Poore, the daughter of Major General Benjamin A. Poore. They were the parents of two sons, one of whom was also a career Army officer. Mauborgne moved to Atlanta, Georgia, in ill health in 1970 and died on June 7, 1971.

General Mauborgne is a member of the Military Intelligence Hall of Fame. General Mauborgne is also known as "The Cubic General".

== Awards and decorations ==
=== Army Distinguished Service Medal citation ===
General Orders: War Department, General Orders No. 81 (1919)
Action Date: World War I
Service: Army
Rank: Lieutenant Colonel
Organization: Chief, Engineering and Research Division
Division: Signal Corps

The President of the United States of America, authorized by Act of Congress, July 9, 1918, takes pleasure in presenting the Army Distinguished Service Medal to Lieutenant Colonel (Signal Corps) Joseph O. Mauborgne, United States Army, for meritorious and distinguished services to the Government of the United States, in a duty of great responsibility during World War I. As head of the Engineering and Research Division of the Signal Corps, Lieutenant Colonel Mauborgne rendered conspicuous in connection with coordinating the design and supply of new technical apparatus for the Signal Corps. He was largely responsible for the high type of radio equipment developed for the American Army and rendered unusual service in connection with cipher telegraphy.
