= Burgess Gunbus =

Type O Gunbus

General information
- Type: Biplane fighter
- National origin: United States
- Manufacturer: Burgess Company
- Primary user: Royal Naval Air Service
- Number built: 36

History
- Introduction date: 1915
- First flight: 1915
- Retired: 1916

The Burgess Type O Gunbus was an American pusher biplane fighter designed and built by the Burgess Company at Marblehead, Massachusetts.

A total of 36 Type Os (also known as the Burgess Gunbus), powered by a single 140 hp (104 kW) Sturtevant engine, was ordered by the British Admiralty in 1915 for use by the Royal Naval Air Service (RNAS). Built in the United States they were shipped to Hendon Aerodrome for erection. The first aircraft flew from Hendon on 26 August 1915 and some of first aircraft were used for training at Hendon and Eastchurch but most went into storage, the last six were not even unpacked. All were removed from the inventory in 1916.

== Operators ==
United Kingdom

- Royal Naval Air Service

== See also ==
Related lists

- List of aircraft of the Royal Naval Air Service
