= Burgess Model H =

Model H
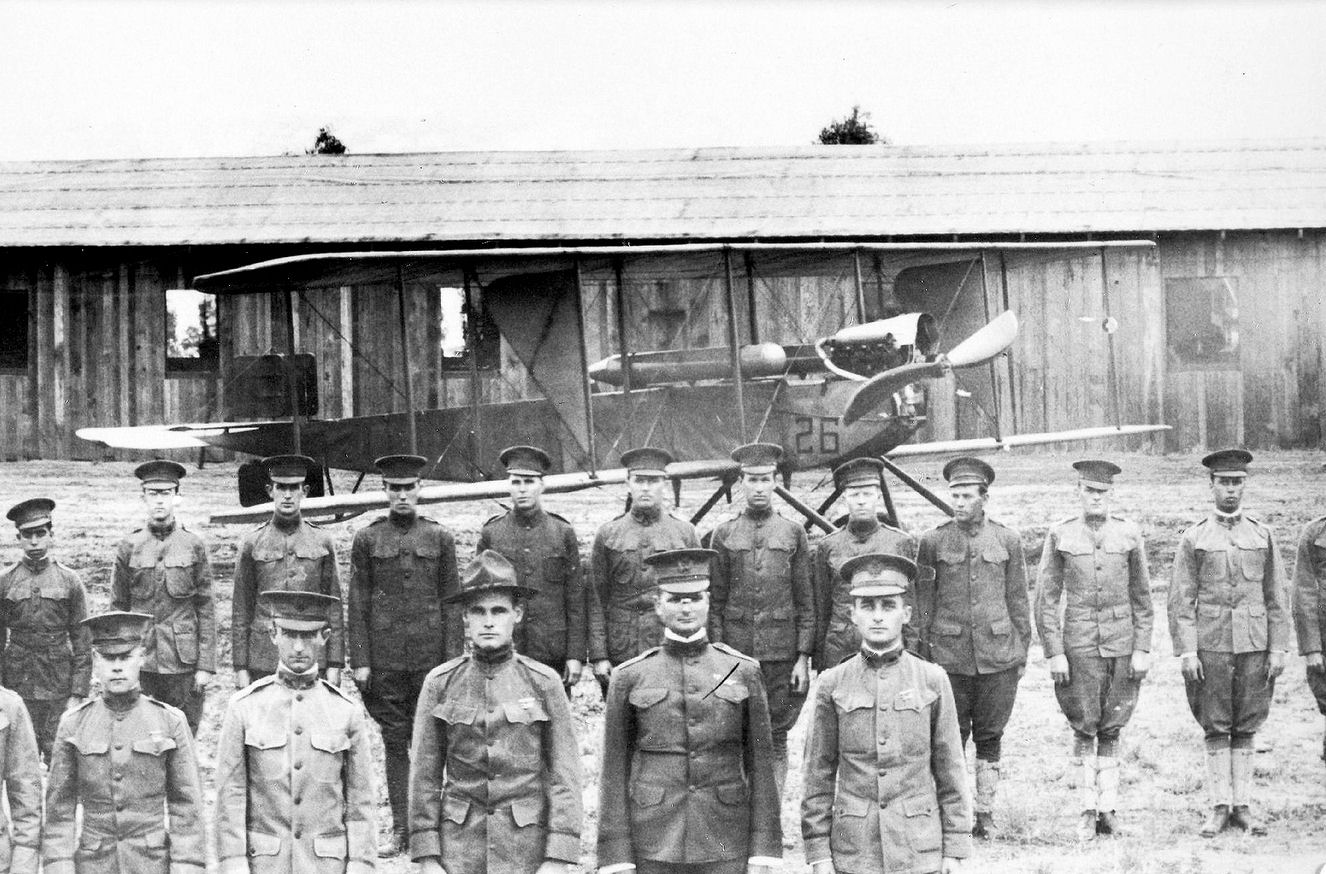
- Burgess H trainer with 1st Aero Squadron, 1915

General information
- Type: Trainer
- Manufacturer: Burgess
- Number built: 7

History
- First flight: 1912

The Burgess Model H was an early United States airplane and one of the first air machines specifically designed and built for military use.

== History ==
Classified as the "Model H military tractor", it was developed and built in 1912 by Burgess Company and Curtis, which in 1914 became the Burgess Company.

Powered by a 70 hp Renault engine with the propeller in the tractor configuration, the biplane trainer had tandem open cockpits after a redesign in 1914 by Grover Loening, then a civilian engineer with the U.S. Army. Loening was the first person to receive an advanced engineering degree in aeronautics, from Columbia University in 1910, and later was a founding member of both Sturtevant Aircraft Company and Loening Aircraft Engineering.

The Aeronautical Division, U.S. Signal Corps purchased its initial Burgess Model H as Signal Corps No. 9 in August 1912, then five more of the Loening design for the 1st Aero Squadron at North Field, California between November 1913 and July 1914. They were the 24th through 28th aircraft acquired by the Army. A seventh Model H went to the U.S. Navy, where it was known first as the D-2 and later as the AB-7 (Heavier-than-air/flying boat, model 7).

== Operators ==
United States

- United States Army
- United States Navy

== Specifications ==
General characteristics

- Crew: Two, pilot and instructor
- Length: 27 ft 9 in (8.46 m)
- Wingspan: 34 ft 6 in (10.52 m)
- Powerplant: 1 × Renault , 70 hp (52 kW)
