= Herbert Dargue =

United States Army Air Forces general

Herbert Arthur Dargue
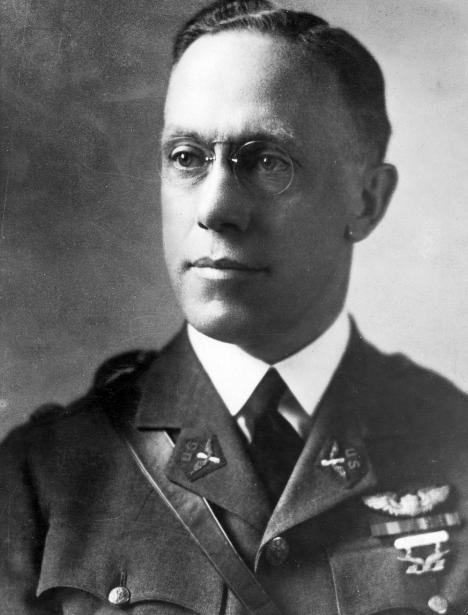
- Born: November 17, 1886; Brooklyn, New York, U.S.
- Died: December 12, 1941 (aged 55) near Bishop, California, U.S.
- Military career
- Allegiance: United States
- Branch: United States Army
- Service years: 1907-1941
- Rank: Major General
- Commands: 19th Composite Wing
- Conflicts: Pancho Villa Expedition; World War I World War II
- Awards: Distinguished Service Medal; Distinguished Flying Cross

Herbert Arthur "Bert" Dargue (November 17, 1886 – December 12, 1941) was a career officer in the United States Army, reaching the rank of major general in the Army Air Forces. He was a pioneer military aviator and one of the first ten recipients of the Distinguished Flying Cross.

== Biography ==
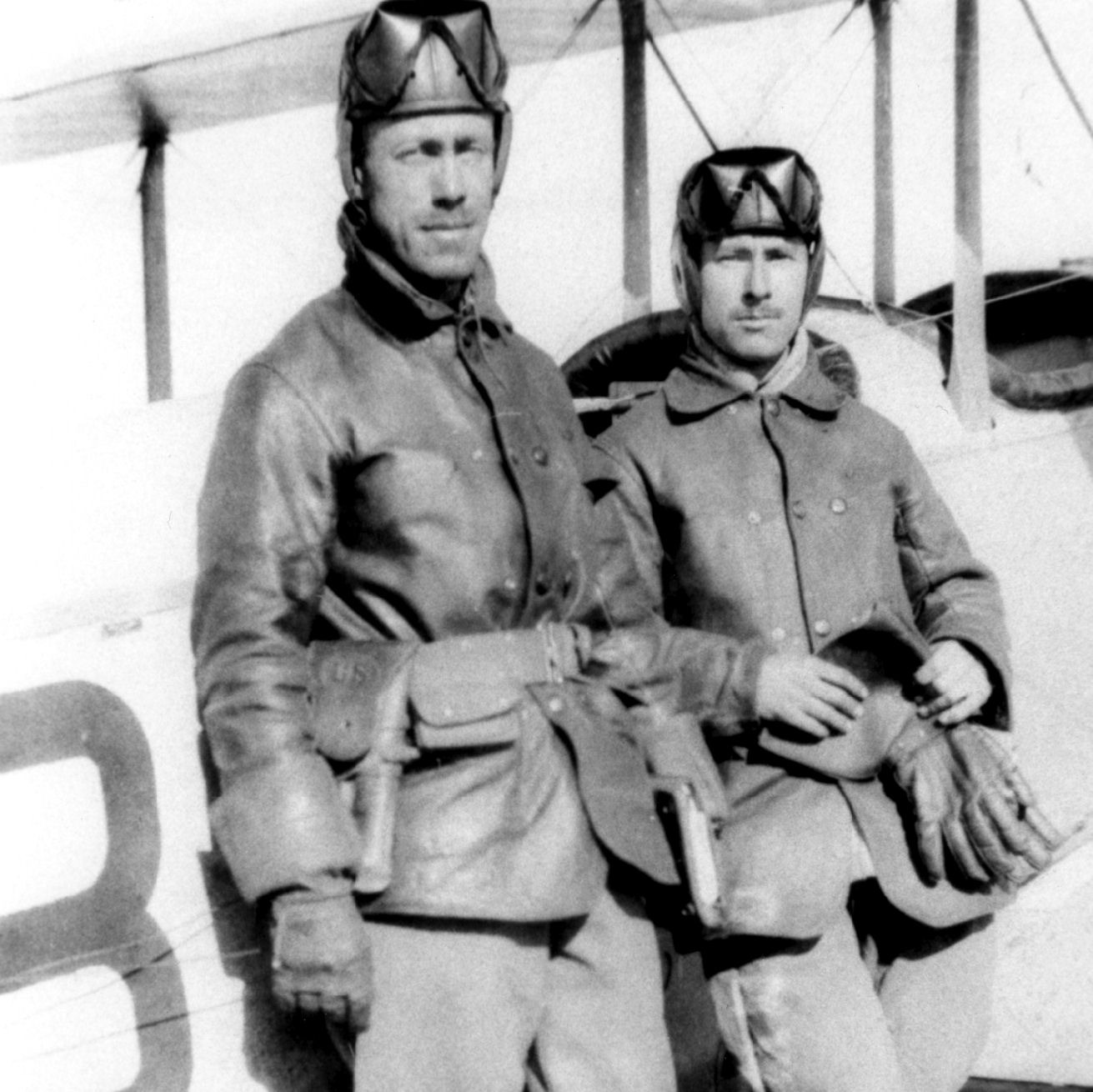
Lts. Dargue (left) and Edgar S. Gorrell (right) pose with Signal Corps No. 43. in 1916 with the 1st Aero Squadron in Mexico during the Pancho Villa Expedition

Dargue was born in Brooklyn, New York in 1886. Raised in Boonton, New Jersey, he graduated in 1905 from Boonton High School, which inducted him in 1996 into its inaugural hall of fame. He entered the United States Military Academy on June 15, 1907. He graduated on June 13, 1911, and was commissioned a 2nd lieutenant in the Coast Artillery Corps. In March 1913, while stationed in the Philippines, he was trained to fly by 1st Lt. Frank Purdy Lahm, and was detailed to the Aviation Section, U.S. Signal Corps on July 23, 1914, as the sole rated pilot in the Philippines. On December 16, 1914, he flew a Burgess Model I seaplane with 1st Lt. Joseph O. Mauborgne of the Signal Corps as his radio operator, making the first two-way communication by radio telegraphy between a ground station and an airplane in flight. The next month he crashed his airplane into San Jose Bay off Corregidor, temporarily ending aviation in the Philippines, and was sent back to the Signal Corps Aviation School at North Field, San Diego, California. From March to July 1916, he was a member of the 1st Aero Squadron when it supported the Pancho Villa Expedition in Mexico.

In 1926 he aided in drafting the legislation that became the Air Corps Act, which led to the establishment of the United States Army Air Corps.

From December 21, 1926, to May 2, 1927, Dargue led the U.S. Army Pan American Flight, a public relations goodwill mission to promote U.S. aviation in South America. Flying five Loening OA-1A seaplanes, each named for an American city, Dargue, Capt. Ira Clarence Eaker, and eight other Army aviators traveled 22,000 miles (35,200 km) in 59 flight days, stopping at 72 cities along the route. The ten airmen, two of whom died in an accident on February 26, 1927, during the mission, were awarded certificates for first awards of the newly created Distinguished Flying Cross.

In 1934, he became the assistant commander of the Air Corps Tactical School.

From 1938 to 1940, he commanded the 19th Composite Wing in the Panama Canal Zone. He returned to the United States in 1940 to become Assistant Chief of the Army Air Corps. The following year, he took command of the First Air Force.

In the aftermath of the attack on Pearl Harbor, Henry Stimson chose Dargue to lead the investigation of why the United States had been unprepared for the attack, and placed him in command of the United States Army units there. However, while flying from Mitchel Field to Hawaii to take his new post, he was killed when his Douglas B-18 Bolo crashed in the Sierra Nevada mountains, outside Bishop, California. The wreckage of the plane was not found for five months. Dargue was the first Army General to die on duty during World War II.

He was posthumously decorated with the Distinguished Service Medal in 1942.

For his dedication to aviation he was inducted into the National Aviation Hall of Fame in 1997.

== Family ==
Dargue's son Donald was also a military aviator, piloting a B-17 bomber over Germany and eventually becoming part of Strategic Air Command; similarly, his grandson Herb Dargue flew helicopters for the United States Army during the Vietnam War and the Iraq War.
