= Burgess HT-2 Speed Scout =

HT-2/HT-B "Speed Scout"
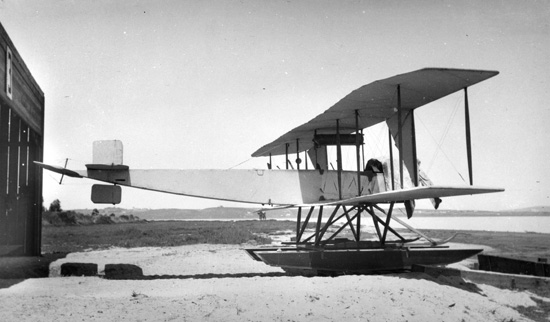
- This picture is actually a Burgess Model H, not a Model 2 Speed Scout

General information
- Type: experimental observation fighter seaplane
- National origin: United States
- Manufacturer: Burgess Company
- Number built: 8

The Burgess HT-2 Speed Scout was an experimental United States observation/fighter seaplane.

== Development and design ==
The Speed Scout's airframe was made of wood with a fabric covering, except for the engine cowling which was aluminum. The aircraft was powered by a Curtiss OXX-2 engine. Despite the aircraft being underpowered, eight were purchased by the US Navy in 1917 following demonstration flights on 19 May 1917.

== Specifications ==
Data from The American Fighter

General characteristics

- Crew: 1
- Length: 22 ft 3 in (6.78 m)
- Wingspan: 34 ft 4 in (10.46 m)
- Height: 10 ft 0 in (3.05 m)
- Wing area: 185.0 sq ft (17.19 m^{2})
- Empty weight: 1,499 lb (680 kg)
- Gross weight: 1,962 lb (890 kg)
- Powerplant: 1 × Curtiss OXX-2 , 100 hp (75 kW)

Performance

- Maximum speed: 95 mph (153 km/h, 83 kn)
- Endurance: 2 hours 30 minutes
