= Burgess Model I =

Model I
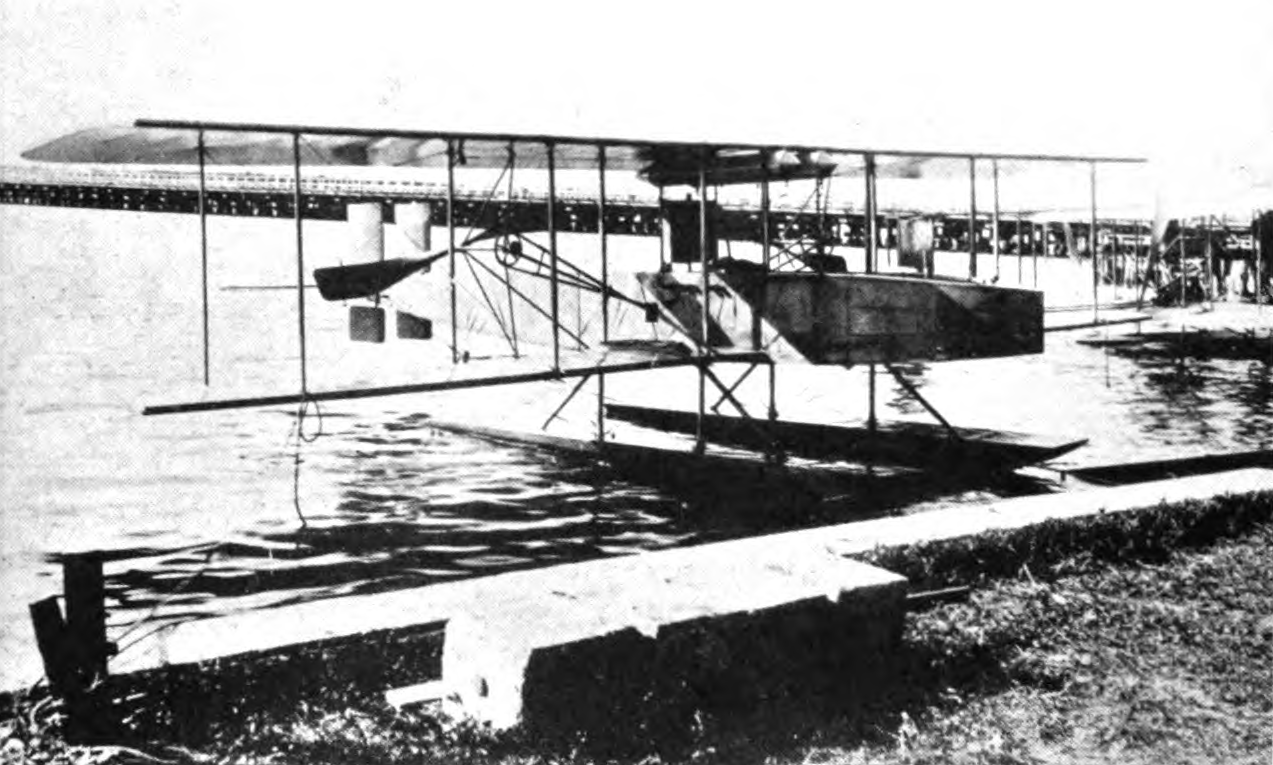

General information
- Type: Reconnaissance seaplane
- Manufacturer: Burgess Company
- Primary user: Aeronautical Division, U.S. Signal Corps; Aviation Section, U.S. Signal Corps
- Number built: 1

History
- First flight: 1913

The Burgess Model I, also known as the Burgess I-Scout and the Coast Defense Hydroaeroplane, was a United States reconnaissance seaplane built for the Aeronautical Division, U.S. Signal Corps in 1913. It was of conventional Wright Model B design but with an engine mounted amidships in an enclosed fuselage, driving by chains two large pusher propellers mounted on the interplane struts. The undercarriage consisted of twin pontoons. The single example built, S.C. No. 17, was delivered to the Army in January 1913 at the Burgess Company and Curtis factory in Massachusetts, then transported to Florida to complete the training of two officers. After the assignment, it was disassembled and moved to the Philippines in September 1913, where it was in and out of service several times before crashing into the sea near Corregidor on January 12, 1915. It is notable as the first U.S. Army aircraft to conduct two-way radio communication with the ground in December 1914.

== Operational history ==
The Burgess Model I was placed into service as Signal Corps Number 17 (S.C. No. 17) in January 1913 to complete the training of Lieutenants Loren H. Call and Eric L. Ellington at Palm Beach, Florida. Following this assignment it was disassembled and shipped by sea to the Philippine Aviation School near Manila, arriving in the first week of September. When it was uncrated for assembly, it was found to have been damaged so severely in transit that both its upper and lower wings needed replacing. 2d Lt. Herbert A. Dargue, a Coast Artillery officer trained as a pilot at the Philippine Aviation School, was detailed October 18 to fly the plane, based on the beach at San Jose on the south side of Corregidor in Manila Bay. After it was placed back into service in November 1913, it was found that center-of-gravity problems with its front-and-back seating arrangement and heavy pontoons made it incapable of taking off with two persons aboard. Dargue continued one-man operations and with a Coast Artillery officer devised a primitive method of signaling with small parachutes and a Very pistol to indicate misses.

S.C. 17 was reconditioned by January 1914 with lighter pontoons that permitted two-man operation. Its hangar was supplied with a cement floor and a marine railway built down to the water to assist in launching the aircraft. The S.C. No. 17 participated in maneuvers with ground troops in February but was damaged during landing on February 20, and was out of service for a month. Between April 28 and May 15 it resumed adjusting fire for the Coast Artillery before going into storage for the rainy season.

When he resumed flying activity in the fall of 1914, Dargue began testing a small radio transmitter-receiver built by a local unit, and was damaged again in October experimenting with antenna location. Ultimately a 200 feet (61 m) wire antenna was paid out behind the aircraft in flight from a reel. Further problems of engine noise, ignition interference, burnout of the signal detector by proximity of the transmitter, and loss of calibration from engine vibration were all overcome. On December 1, 1914, Dargue and 1st Lt. Joseph O. Mauborgne, the Signal Corps officer in charge of the Fort Mills radio station, began a series seven test flights of the radio. During the third, on December 11, the first two-way telegraphy communication with the ground was performed, at a range of 10 miles (16 km) for communication with the ground and 4 miles (6.4 km) for the return signal to the airplane, flying at an altitude of 600 feet (180 m), the first radio signal received by an airplane. On the last flight, December 16, using a switch designed to alternate between receiving and transmitting modes, Mauborgne conducted the first airborne "conversation" with the ground.

On January 12, 1915, Dargue and an enlisted spotter encountered strong winds over San Jose Bay. Dargue lost control attempting to avoid the cliffs on Corregidor, but was able to recover sufficiently to crash-land the plane tail first in the bay, causing a total loss. Because S.C. No. 17 was the only aircraft left in the Philippines, the Philippine Aviation School was closed and Dargue transferred back to San Diego, California.

== Operators ==
- Aeronautical Division, U.S. Signal Corps/Aviation Section, U.S. Signal Corps
  - Philippine Aviation School

== Specifications ==
General characteristics

- Crew: Two, pilot and observer
- Length: 31 ft 4 in (9.55 m)
- Wingspan: 39 ft 10 in (12.14 m)
- Powerplant: 1 × Sturtevant D-6 8-cylinder , 60 hp (45 kW)

Performance

- Maximum speed: 59 mph (95 km/h, 51 kn)
