= Charles deForest Chandler =

United States military aviator (1878–1939)

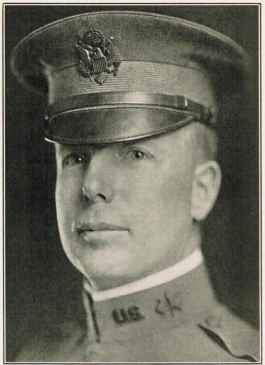
- Military portrait, sometime between 1910 and 1918.
- Born: December 24, 1878
- Died: May 18, 1939 (aged 60)
- Buried: Arlington National Cemetery
- Allegiance: United States
- Branch: Signal Corps
- Service years: 1899–1920
- Rank: Colonel
- Commands: Balloon section of the American Expeditionary Forces in WWI
- Known for: One of first aviators to show that a machine gun could be fired from an airplane
- Awards: Distinguished Service Medal

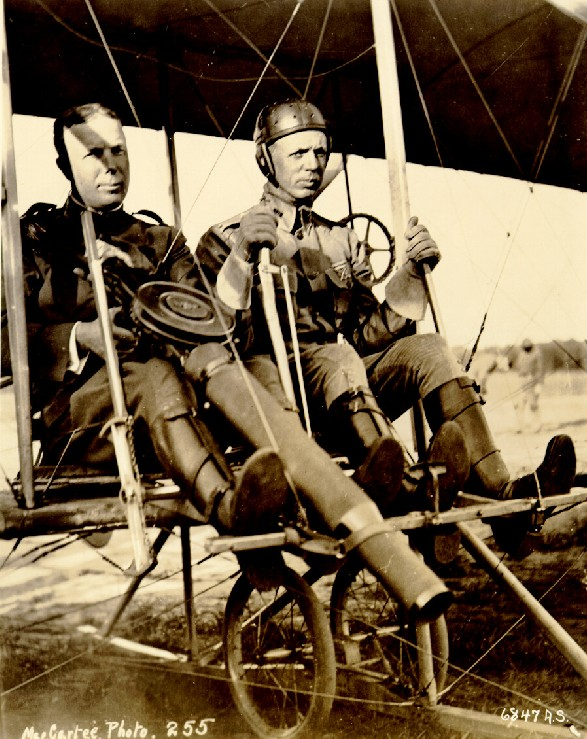
Captain Charles Chandler with prototype Lewis Gun and Lt. Roy Carrington Kirtland in a Wright Model B Flyer after the first successful firing of a machine-gun from an aeroplane in June 1912.

Colonel Charles deForest Chandler (December 24, 1878 – May 18, 1939) was an American military aviator, and the first head of the Aeronautical Division, U.S. Signal Corps, that later became the United States Air Force. He was one of earliest aviators to show that a machine gun could be fired from an airplane.

== Biography ==
He was born in Cleveland, Ohio, on Christmas Eve, December 24, 1878. He was commissioned as a first lieutenant in the Signal Corps during the Spanish–American War. He was discharged in 1899 but was re-commissioned in 1901.

While in the rank of captain, he served as of the Aeronautical Division of the Signal Corps from August 1, 1907, to May 13, 1908, and also from June 20, 1911, to April 1, 1913.

With the United States entering World War I in April 1917, he quickly rose from captain to temporary colonel in a period of only seven months, during which he commanded the balloon section of the American Expeditionary Forces. He was awarded the Distinguished Service Medal for his services during the war.

Chandler reverted to his permanent rank of lieutenant colonel in April 1920 and retired from the army for disability in the line of duty in October of the same year. He was promoted to colonel on the retired list in June 1930.

He died on May 18, 1939, and was buried at Arlington National Cemetery.

== Publications ==
- Balloon and airship gases (1926) with Walter Stuart Diehl

== Awards ==
- Distinguished Service Medal
- Spanish War Service Medal
- Philippine Campaign Medal
- World War I Victory Medal

== Dates of rank ==
First Lieutenant, Volunteer Army: 25 June 1898 (Discharged on 26 April 1899.)
First Lieutenant, Regular Army: 25 April 1901 (Date of rank was 1 February 1901.)
Captain, Regular Army: 2 March 1903
Major, Regular Army: 14 February 1917
Lieutenant Colonel, Regular Army: 15 May 1917
Colonel, Army of the United States: 6 September 1917 (Date of rank was 5 August 1917.)
Lieutenant Colonel, Regular Army: 15 April 1920 (Reverted to permanent rank.)
Lieutenant Colonel, Retired list: 18 October 1920
Colonel, Retired list: 21 June 1930
