= Beckwith Havens =

American aviator

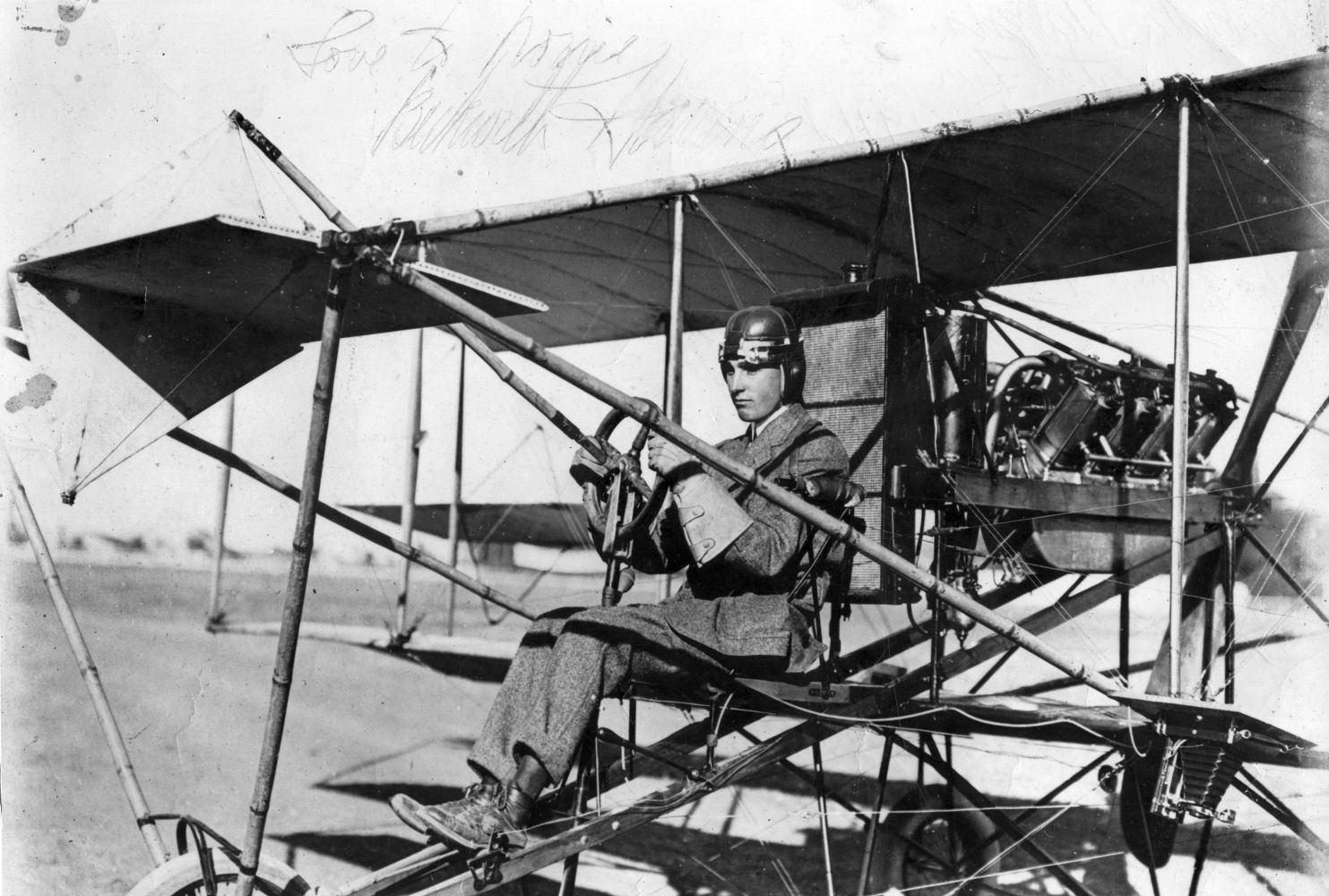
- Beckwith Havens at Dallas State Fair, 1911
- Born: May 28, 1890; New York City, New York (Manhattan)
- Died: May 9, 1969 (aged 78); New York City, New York
- Resting place: Mount Hope Cemetery, Rochester, New York (Monroe County)
- Occupations: Aviator salesman
- Years active: 1910-1960s
- Spouse: Angela Hubbell Cobb Havens

Beckwith Havens (1890–1969) was an early American aviator. He flew primarily on the Curtiss Pusher aircraft. In later life he gave accounts of what it was like to be an aviator in the pioneer days. He related how pilots were sometimes forced to fly in dangerous weather and conditions often from the threat of the spectators who came to witness early aviation.

== Life and career ==
Havens was born to Abraham Britton Havens and Leila Havens (nee Beckwith) in 1890. In 1910 he joined Glenn Curtiss's burgeoning aviation company first as a salesman then trained as an exhibition pilot. Havens stated that pilots were dying so fast that he'd be forced to fill exhibition dates. At one point before the season was over he'd inherit three different airplanes and three sets of mechanics. In Chippewa Falls, Wisconsin at the behest of an angry crowd he was forced to fly and was almost killed when in windy conditions he crashed into power lines which fortunately had the power turned off. Primitive flying fields and unprepared grass terrains were often a hazard to early pilots. In 1914 Havens announced plans for a transatlantic and world circling flight and was having special plane built. During World War 1 Havens worked as a test pilot with the U.S. Navy. In WW2 he was in command of a naval installation at San Julien, Cuba. He worked as a distributor for Fairchild Aviation Corporation.

In 1960 Havens published a book Reminiscences of Beckwith Havens. He died in May 1969 at age 78.
