= Lewis C. Rockwell =

United States Army Second Lieutenant

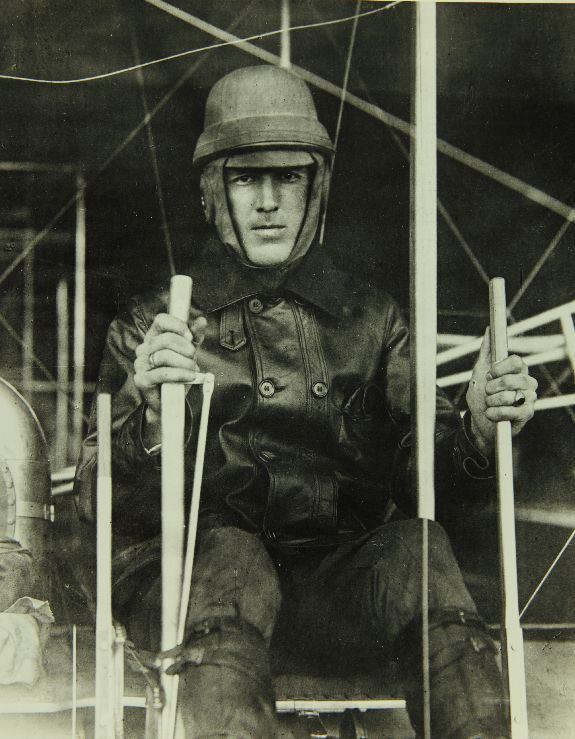
Lt L. C. Rockwell of the 10th United States Infantry Regiment at the controls of a Curtiss Model E - College Park, Maryland (1912)

Lewis Cassidy Rockwell (23 November 1884 – 28 September 1912) was a United States Army Second Lieutenant who died in an aircraft crash. Rockwell was the fourth commissioned officer of the United States Army to meet death in an aviation accident. His passenger, Corporal Frank S. Scott, was the first enlisted American to die in an air crash. The crash was the first in the world in which two or more persons were killed.

== Early life ==
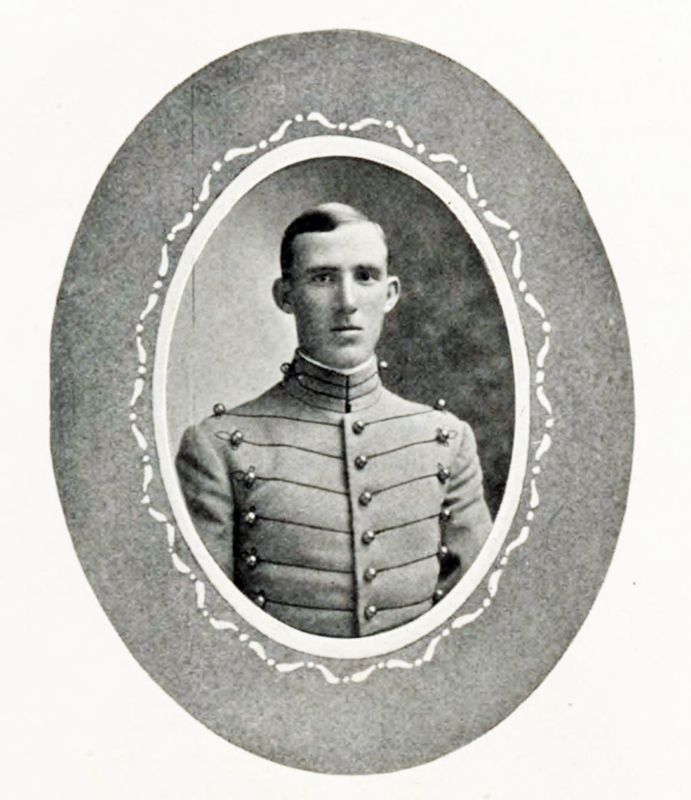
Lewis Cassidy Rockwell at the United States Military Academy, c. 1907

Rockwell was born in Glendale, Ohio, on 23 November 1884, (Note: Some sources give his birth year as 1885.) the son of Cecilia Sherman Moulton née Little (1861–1919) and Charles Henry Rockwell (1848–1888). His siblings were Frances Sherman Rockwell McLaren (1883–1961) and Charlotte Henrietta Rockwell Lackman (1886–1964). He entered the United States Military Academy in 1903 and on graduating he received his commission as a Second Lieutenant in 1907. Assigned to the Third infantry, he afterwards was transferred to the Tenth infantry, from which he volunteered his services in the Aviation Corps. Regarded as a most careful aviator, Rockwell had received his certificate as a civilian pilot three weeks before the crash.

== Death ==
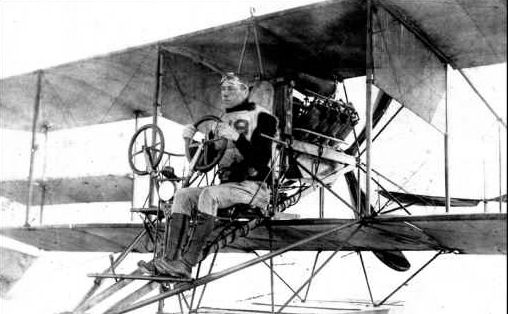
Lt Lewis Cassidy Rockwell at the controls of an aircraft

By 27 September Second Lieutenant Rockwell had promised Corporal Frank S. Scott an aircraft-ride on 28 September while testing for his aviator ratings. An officer had asked to be Rockwell's passenger, but since Scott weighed less (having not fully recovered from an illness in 1911), he received the coveted seat; excited about the upcoming flight, Scott joked with a visiting Captain Bernard Rome that he was just 2LT Rockwell's "ballast".

The next day, Rockwell test-flew the plane alone to ensure proper functioning; after reaching 40 miles per hour (64 km/h) and assured that the aircraft was functioning properly, the lieutenant landed and picked up Scott. The takeoff and flight itself were uneventful as the small craft flew at an altitude of 150 feet (46 m) for about ten minutes. However, when attempting to land, the plane developed engine problems and began to dive; Rockwell stopped the plane's 30-horsepower (22 kW) engine within 30 feet (9.1 m) of the ground, but could not stop the descent and crash. Scott was dead at the scene, but Rockwell, his head buried partly in the earth, was still alive but unconscious. He never regained consciousness and died later at Walter Reed General Hospital. More than 300 people watched the crash.

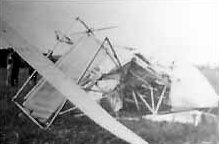
The crashed aircraft S.C.4

The plane in question had been rebuilt thrice and logged over one thousand flights; it was made of wood, wire, cloth, and glue. The official incident investigation found that the plane's control wires were still intact after the crash. Coupled with eyewitness accounts, the investigatory board determined that pilot error was the cause: Rockwell misjudged the plane's altitude upon descent and could not recover from the dive.

The Army Investigating Board examining the accident later reported that:

Lieutenant L. C. Rockwell's defective eyesight probably was responsible for the aeroplane accident at the army aviation school last Saturday in which Lieutenant Rockwell, who was flying the aeroplane, and Corporal F. S. Scott, were killed. The army investigating board reported today expressing the opinion that "their accident was caused by the aviator misjudging his height from the ground and his failure to bring the machine out of the glide in sufficient time to clear the ground.

Since the tragedy many of Lieutenant Rockwell's friends have recalled that he was subject to sudden spells of blurred vision. It is not unlikely that in the future all army aviators will have to pass a more rigid occular test.

== Legacy ==
Scott and Rockwell were buried in Arlington National Cemetery on 1 October 1912. Rockwell Field, located on North Island in San Diego, California, originally called the Signal Corps Aviation School, was renamed in his honor on 20 July 1917.
