= Roy C. Kirtland =

American Army officer (1874–1941)

Roy Carrington Kirtland
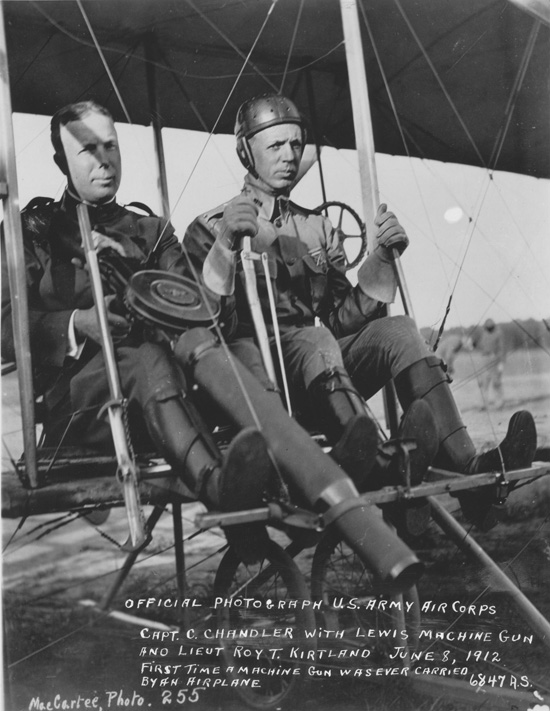
- Roy Kirtland (at right), flying a Wright 1911 Model B Flyer
- Born: May 14, 1874; Fort Benton, Montana
- Died: May 2, 1941 (aged 66); Moffett Field, California
- Spouse: Helen K. Parker
- Military career
- Allegiance: United States
- Branch: United States Army
- Service years: 1898–1938, 1941
- Rank: Colonel
- Commands: 1st Aero Squadron; 3d US Infantry Regiment; Langley Field; Air Corps Tactical School

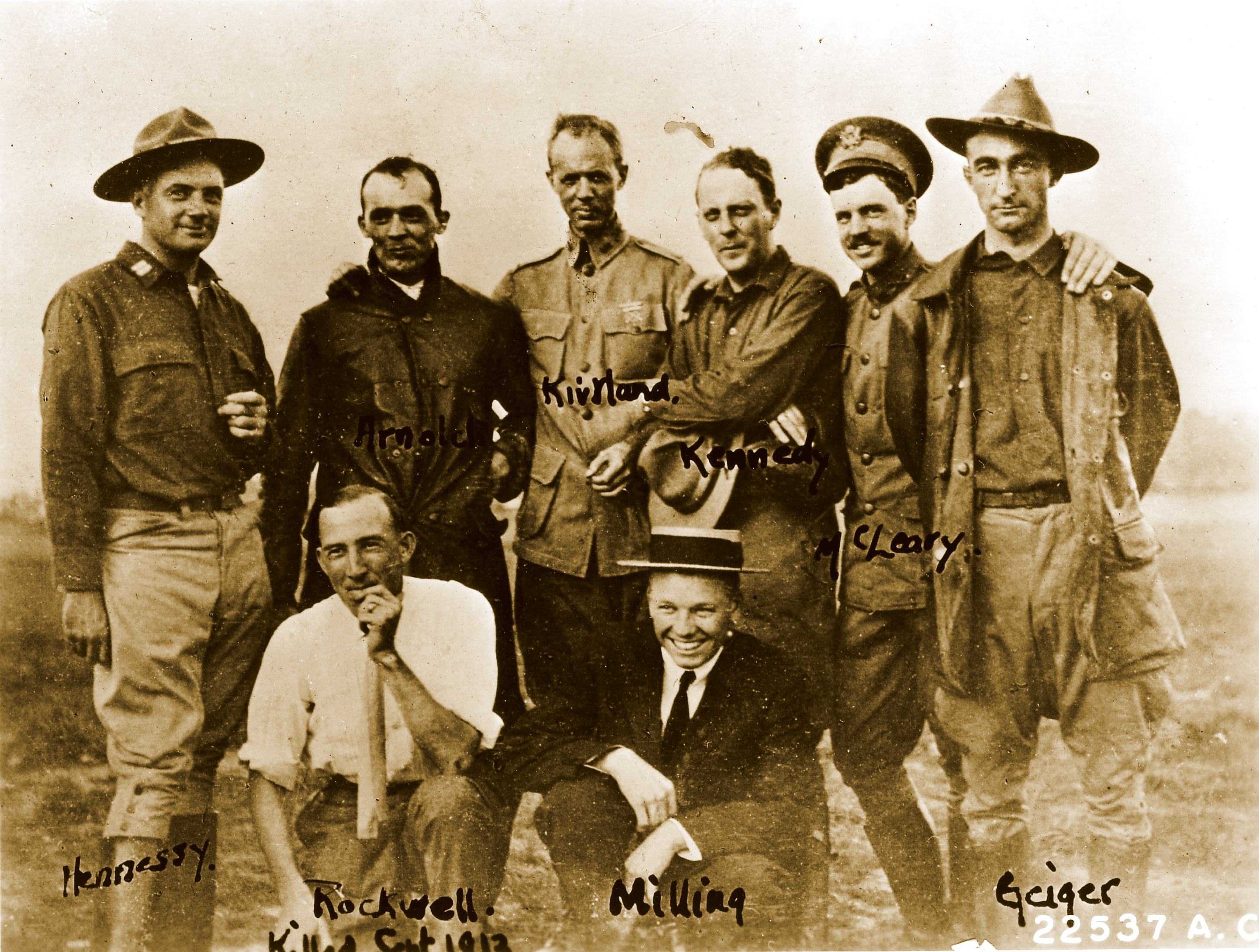
Standing from left to right are: Captain Fredrick B. Hennessy (1879–1948), Lieutenant Henry Harley Arnold (1886–1950), Lieutenant Roy Carrington Kirtland (1874–1941), Captain Frank N. Kennedy (1861–1945), Lieutenant Samuel H. McLeary (1881–1924), Lieutenant Harold Geiger (1884–1927). Sitting from left to right are: Lieutenant Lewis C. Rockwell (1885–1912) and Lieutenant Thomas DeWitt Milling (1887–1960). Image taken at College Park, Maryland in 1911.

Roy Carrington Kirtland (14 May 1874 – 2 May 1941) was a United States Army soldier, officer and aviator. Kirtland Air Force Base in Albuquerque, New Mexico was named for him. He was among the first American military aviators and he recommended Henry "Hap" Arnold for aviation training.

== Biography ==
He was born on May 14, 1874, in Fort Benton, Montana to Thaddeus Sanford Kirtland and Ann Virginia Carter. He married Helen K. Parker.

Kirtland joined the Army in 1898 and was commissioned on August 1, 1901, as a second lieutenant in the infantry. In 1911 he was transferred to the United States Army Air Service and placed in command of the U.S. Aviation School at College Park, Maryland from April to June 1911, and served in a number of capacities with the Signal Corps

Kirtland then commanded the First Aero Squadron in 1913 until his return to the infantry division in 1915. He rejoined Signal Corps aviation in 1917 and was tasked to organize four Air Service Mechanics Regiments, subsequently commanding the third in France. While overseas, he served as the Inspector for aviation in England and air service rest camps.

After the war, Kirtland became a flight instructor, commanded aviation supply depots and graduated from the United States Army War College. During the 1920s he served with the General Staff until his appointment in 1930 as commandant of the Langley Station and as acting commandant of the Air Corps Tactical School. He retired in 1938 after 40 years service.

Colonel Kirtland was reactivated in advance of World War II at age 65. He served at Moffett Field.

He died on May 2, 1941, of a heart attack in Moffett Field, California. He was buried at Fort Rosecrans National Cemetery in San Diego, California.

== Legacy ==
At special request from General H. H. Arnold, Albuquerque Air Army Airbase was renamed Kirtland Army Airfield.
