= List of Wright brothers aircraft =

From 1903 to 1916

During their lives, the Wright brothers created a variety of aircraft, including the world's first airplane in 1903. Some of the aircraft on this list were built by the Wright brothers' first aircraft manufacturing company, the Wright Company.

== List ==
Model	Image
1900 Wright Glider – Because it produced inadequate lift, the Wrights mostly flew their first glider as a kite at Kitty Hawk during October 1900. 5.3 meter wingspan. The glider originally had a tail with fixed horizontal and vertical surfaces, but this was eliminated sometime during the Wright's flying experiments.	
1901 Wright Glider – Their second glider flew several hundred times at Kitty Hawk in July and August 1901, making flights that ranged from 50 to 400 feet (15 to 122 meters). It had a wingspan of 6.7 meters. Despite being able to carry a passenger, it still did not produce the amount of lift Wilbur's calculations had predicted.	
1902 Wright Glider – The Wrights' third glider was the world's first aircraft with three-axis aerodynamic control; that is, it could be made to pitch, roll, and yaw in flight with movable surfaces. It had the same wingspan as the previous glider. It was the basis for the Wrights' "flying machine" patent in 1906.	
Wright Flyer – First powered, heavier-than-air machine to achieve controlled sustained flight with a pilot aboard. 12.3 meter wingspan. Made the first flight on December 17, 1903 at Kitty Hawk, with the last flight being 255.6 meters. After its flights, it got severely damaged by heavy wind.	
Wright Flyer II – Almost complete copy of the original flyer, but it had a flatter camber and stronger skids. Used a falling weight to help take off, and made the first airplane flight in a complete circle, which covered 1,240 meters in 1 minute 16 seconds.	
Wright Flyer III – Worlds first practical aircraft. Both the canard and the rudder were extended out to make it easier to control, with semi-circular "blinkers" between the surfaces of the canard prevent the nose from dropping when the aircraft turned. With this aircraft, on October 5, 1905 Wilbur made a 39-minute flight that covered 39.2 km (24.5 miles)	
Wright Model A – Development of the Wright Flyer III that helped convince people of the Wrights legitimacy. It was also the first two-seat aircraft, and the first Wright aircraft in which the occupants sat upright. Despite the name, the largest number of Model A's were actually being produced in Germany by Flugmaschine Wright GmbH, which built about 60 examples.	
Wright Military Flyer – One-of-a-kind Model A that became the first military aircraft. 11.1 meter wingspan. Sold to the United States Army Signal Corp in 1909 and had a top speed of 42 miles per hour.	
Wright Model B – Built by the newly formed Wright Company, this was the first mass-produced airplane. It had a wingspan of 11.89 meters. It was later sold to the Burgess Company, who later made the most Model B's.	
Wright Model R – Also called the "Roadster" and the "Baby Wright", the Wrights built this small one-place biplane especially for their British friend Alec Ogilvie in 1910. It is recognisable for its small size (wingspan of 8 meters) and fast speed. (top speed of 70 mph)	
1911 Wright Glider – In 1911, Orville returned to Kitty Hawk with a new glider designed to test the idea that if a glider in an updraft that descends at the same rate as the air is rising can remain aloft indefinitely. With this machine, he set the world's first soaring record, hovering above the sand for 9-3/4 minutes. The craft had a 9.6 meter wingspan.	
Wright Model EX – A scaled-down, single-seat derivative of the Model B designed for exhibition flying It had a wingspan similar to that of the Model B. This was the first aircraft to be flown across a continent, crossing America is a series of flights that took 82 days to complete.	
Wright Model C – This aircraft replaced the Model B as the standard Wright Aircraft in 1912. It had a wingspan of 11.6 meters. The extra power and speed made the aircraft more difficult to fly, which caused the US military to ground all "pusher" aircraft, including all Wright models.	
Wright Model D – This aircraft was built to sell to the United States Army for an observation aircraft. It had a wingspan of 8.2 meters. The Model D could fly 66.9 mph and climb 525 feet per minute, but its excessive landing speed discouraged the Army from ordering more. The aircraft were not flown regularly and were retired in 1914.	
Wright Model C-H – The first dedicated Wright hydroplane. It was essentially a Model C on a single wide pontoon. It was a heavy lifter for a water-based aircraft, able to lift over 800 lbs (363 kg) off the surface.	
Wright Model E – This was the first in the series of Wright Flyers that used a single propeller. It had a wingspan of 9.8 meters. Its design made it easy to set up and tear down, make it easy to transport. This was also the flyer that Orville chose to demonstrate his automatic stabilizer for the first time. Albert Elton (1881–1975) purchased the sole Wright Model E for exhibition flights.	
Wright Model F – It was the first Wright design to feature a fuselage, which marked a radical departure in design for the Wright Company. It had a wingspan of 12.8 meters. The fuselage was partially covered in aluminum, earning it the nickname "Tin Cow."	
Wright Model G – The only flying boat built by the Wright Company. It was designed by Grover Loening, first under the supervision of Wilbur Wright, then after Wilbur's death, under Orville's supervision. It had a wingspan of 11.58 meters.	
Wright Model H & HS – These aircraft were very similar to the Model F, but the fuselage was streamlined so that it tapered back to the tail. The HS had a short wingspan, just 9.75 meters to give it more speed and increased rate of climb. The H had longer wings for an increased payload. This was the last Wright "pusher" and the last with a double rudder.	
Wright Model K – The Model K was the first Wright design to use ailerons instead of wing warping, and the first to feature tractor propellers. It had a wingspan of 11.76 meters. It was also the last to use the distinctive Wright bent-end propellers, designed nearly ten years previously.	
Wright Model L – The Model L was designed to fill the U.S. Army's request for a light, fast scouting machine. This was the last aircraft manufactured by the Wright Company. It had a wingspan of 8.84 meters Aviation historian Richard P. Hallion described it as the "antithesis" of established Wright design.	

Note: The Wright Company never made a Model I or a Model J. These were made by the Burgess Company which licensed Wright patents.
