= Wright Model D =

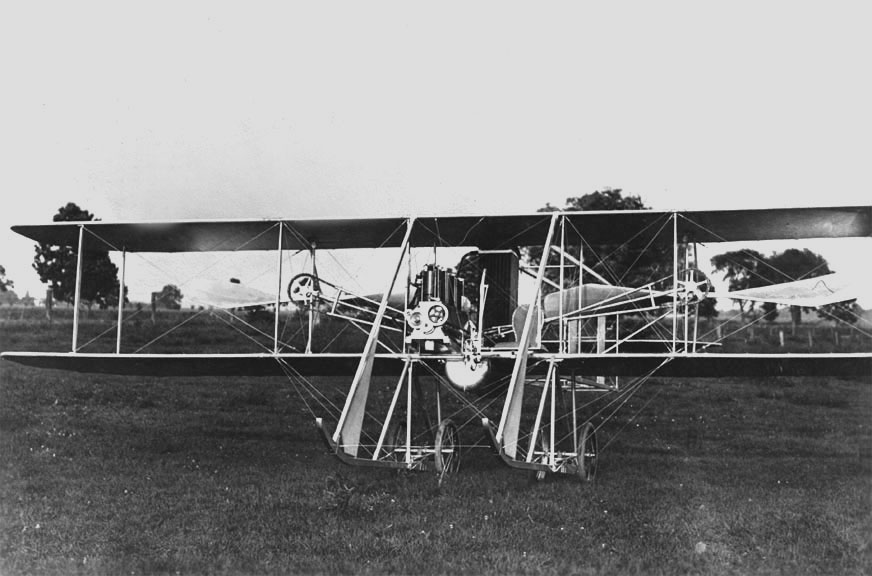
- Wright Model D front view on ground, Simms Station near Dayton, Ohio, 1912

General information
- Type: Observation
- National origin: United States of America
- Manufacturer: Wright Company
- Designer: Wright Brothers
- Primary user: United States Army
- Number built: 2

History
- Introduction date: 1912
- Developed from: Wright Model C

The Wright Model D was built to sell to the United States Army for an observation aircraft. It was similar in design to the Wright Model R with a 6-60 motor. The Model D could fly 66.9 mph and climb 525 feet per minute, but its excessive landing speed discouraged the Army from ordering more.

== Development ==
The aircraft was built to fulfill a request by the United States Army for a speed scout.

== Design ==
The single seat aircraft was made from ash and spruce wood coated with aluminum powder. It used forward mounted finlets ("blinkers" in Wright terminology) to stabilize the aircraft. It was powered by the last six cylinder engine built by the Wright Brothers with a rubber band drive on the flywheel. The 406 cubic inch engine ran at 1,400 to 1560rpm powering two counterrotating propellers via chains.

== Operational history ==
Orville Wright considered the Model D “the easiest to control of any we have ever built” with the exception of the high landing speed. The United States Army acquired two aircraft in August 1912. One of the two was wrecked and rebuilt during trials. On May 3, 1913 the "speed scout" S.C. no 19 was accepted, and on June 6, 1913 the second aircraft was accepted. Both were not flown regularly and were retired in 1914.

The 1913 engine is on display at the Smithsonian National Air and Space Museum.

== Specifications (Wright Model D) ==
Data from AFHRA

General characteristics

- Length: 20 ft (6.1 m)
- Wingspan: 27 ft (8.2 m)
- Height: 7 ft (2.1 m)
- Wing area: 180 sq ft (17 m^{2})
- Aspect ratio: 8.1
- Gross weight: 1,050 lb (476 kg)
- Powerplant: 1 × Wright 6-70 In Line 6 cylinder, liquid-cooled, 6.64 L (405 cu in) Bore and Stroke: 11.113 cm (4.375 in) x 11.430 cm (4.500 in) Weight (wet): 159 kg (350 lb) (5 lb/hp), 70 hp (52 kW) 1400 rpm

Performance

- Cruise speed: 58.1 kn (66.9 mph, 107.7 km/h)
- Rate of climb: 525 ft/min (2.67 m/s)
- Wing loading: 5.83 lb/sq ft (28.5 kg/m^{2})
