= Wright Model K =

American military floatplane of 1915

Model K
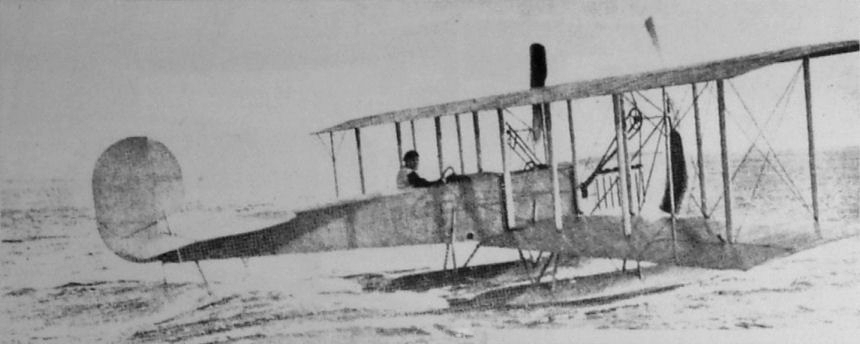

General information
- Type: Military floatplane
- National origin: United States
- Manufacturer: Wright Company
- Designer: Grover Loening
- Primary user: U.S. Navy

History
- First flight: 1915

The Wright Model K was a prototype floatplane built by the Wright Company in 1914 and sold to the U.S. Navy. Its layout was generally similar to the Wright Model F: a typical Wright-style wing cellule and powerplant installation combined with a more modern fuselage design.

The Model K was the first Wright design to use ailerons instead of wing warping, and the first to feature tractor propellers. It was also the last Wright design to feature the wing and engine configuration that had been used on every Wright aircraft from Flyer I onwards, and the last sale by the company to the U.S. military.

== Design ==
The Model K was a three-bay unstaggered biplane with equal-span wings.The pilot and observer sat in tandem in open cockpits. A piston engine was mounted in the nose, which powered two two-bladed propellers via chain drives. Unlike previous Wright designs, these propellers were mounted tractor-fashion, and higher in the interplane gap. The empennage was arranged as a conventional tail, with an almost circular fin and rudder. The Model K was equipped with two long, pontoon-style floats.

== Development ==
In March 1915, the U.S. Navy invited submissions from fourteen aircraft manufacturers, including Wright, for nine seaplanes. The specifications required by the Navy included that propellers be mounted tractor-wise, and that ailerons be used for directional control. Both of these were a departure from the way Wright had been building aircraft, but the Model K incorporated these features.

== Operational history ==
The U.S. Navy purchased the prototype Model K and assigned it the serial AH-23 (later, A51). No order for further production resulted, and this, the only Model K ever built, was removed from service in February 1917.

== Operators ==
- United States Navy

== Specifications ==
Data from Hallion 2019, p.71

General characteristics

- Crew: 2
- Length: 27 ft 3 in (8.31 m)
- Wingspan: 38 ft 7 in (11.76 m)
- Height: 8 ft 6 in (2.59 m)
- Wing area: 450 sq ft (42 m^{2}) (estimated)
- Empty weight: 850 lb (386 kg)
- Gross weight: 1,150 lb (522 kg)
- Powerplant: 1 × Wright 6-60 six-cylinder, water-cooled, inline engine, 60 hp (45 kW)

Performance

- Maximum speed: 80 mph (130 km/h, 70 kn) (estimated)

== Notes ==
=== Bibliography ===
- Hallion, Richard P. (2019). The Wright Flyers 1899–1916. Oxford: Osprey.
- The Illustrated Encyclopedia of Aircraft. London: Aerospace Publishing.
- MacFarland, Marvin W. (1953). The Papers of Wilbur and Orville Wright, Including the Chanute-Wright Letters and Other Papers of Octave Chanute: Volume Two 1906–1948. New York: MacGraw–Hill.
- Roach, Edward J. (2014). The Wright Company: From Invention to Industry. Athens, OH: Ohio University Press.
- Swanborough, Gordon; Bowers, Peter M. (1990). United States Navy Aircraft Since 1911. London: Putnam.
- Taylor, Michael J. H. (1993). Jane's Encyclopedia of Aviation. London: Studio Editions.
