= Wright Vertical 4 =

1900s American piston aircraft engine

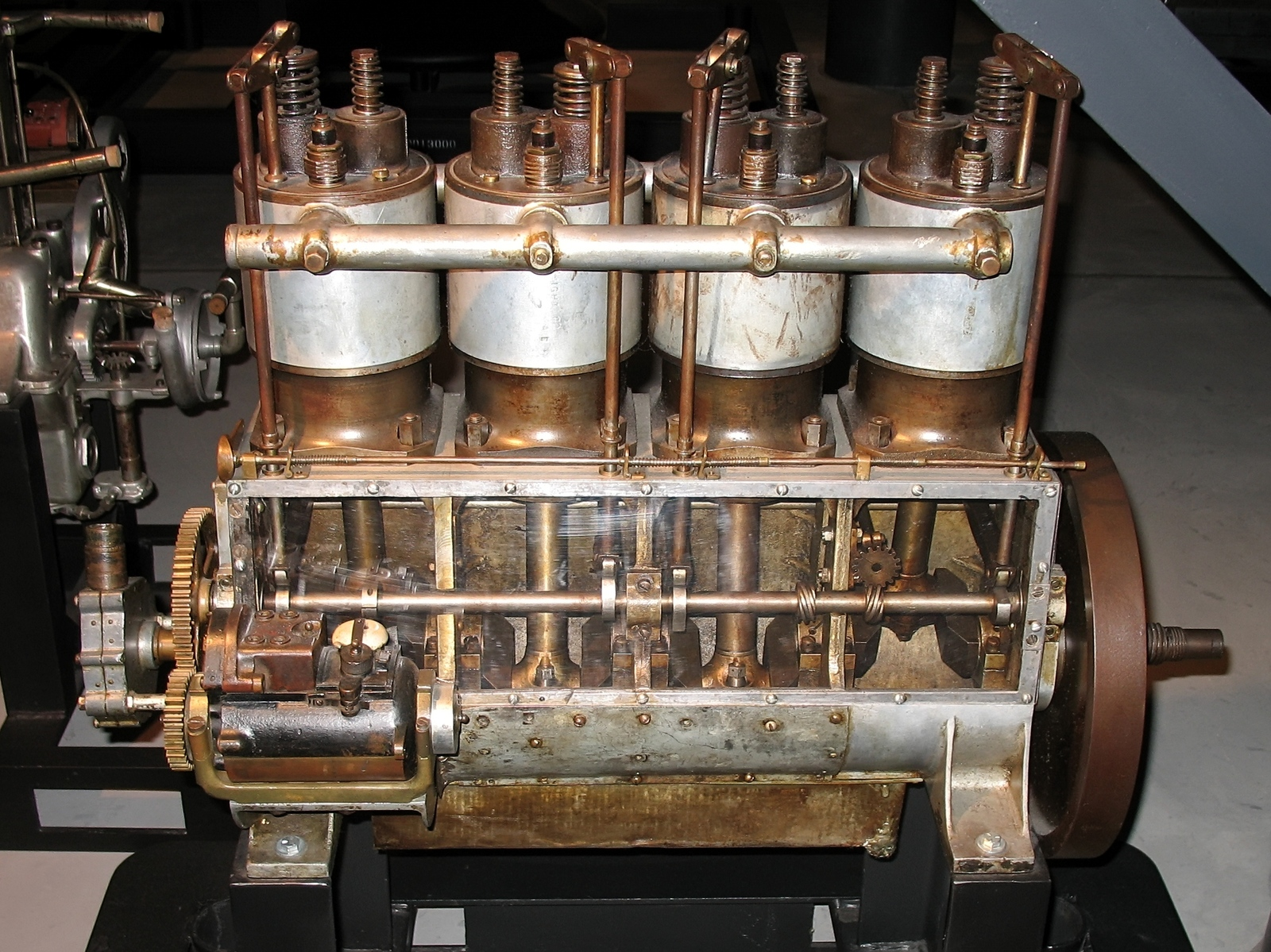
- Wright Vertical 4 aircraft engine on display at the Steven F. Udvar-Hazy Center. This particular engine was used on the Wright B-1 seaplane that crashed in 1912. A patch was bolted to the side of the crankcase in an attempt to repair the engine.
- Type: Liquid-cooled inline-4 piston aero engine
- National origin: United States
- Manufacturer: Wright Company
- Designer: Orville Wright
- Major applications: Wright Model A; Wright Model B
- Number built: around 100

The Wright Vertical 4 was an American aircraft engine built by the Wright brothers in the very early years of powered flight. It was a liquid-cooled piston engine with four inline cylinders, mounted vertically (earlier Wright engines were mounted horizontally). It generated about 30–40 horsepower (22–30 kW) from a displacement of 240 cubic inches (3.9 liters) and weighed about 160–180 pounds (73–82 kg). Developed by Orville Wright in 1906, the Vertical 4 was produced by the Wright Company until 1912 and was the most numerous engine they manufactured. Around one hundred Vertical 4 engines were built, according to a Wright test foreman.

The Vertical 4 powered most Wright aircraft during this period, including the Model A and Model B and variants built for the U.S. Army and Navy.

This engine was also built under license by Bariquand et Marre in France and by Neue Automobil-Gesellschaft in Germany.

== Applications ==
- Wright Model A
- Wright Model B
- Wright Model R

== Engines on display ==
Wright Vertical 4 engines can be seen on display in the following museums, among others:

- National Air and Space Museum, Washington, D.C.
- Steven F. Udvar-Hazy Center, Chantilly, Virginia
- Wright Brothers Aviation Center in Carillon Historical Park, Dayton, Ohio
- Hiller Aviation Museum, San Carlos, California
- New England Air Museum, Windsor Locks, Connecticut
- Museum of Science and Industry, Chicago, Illinois
- National Museum of Flight, East Fortune, Scotland

== Specifications ==
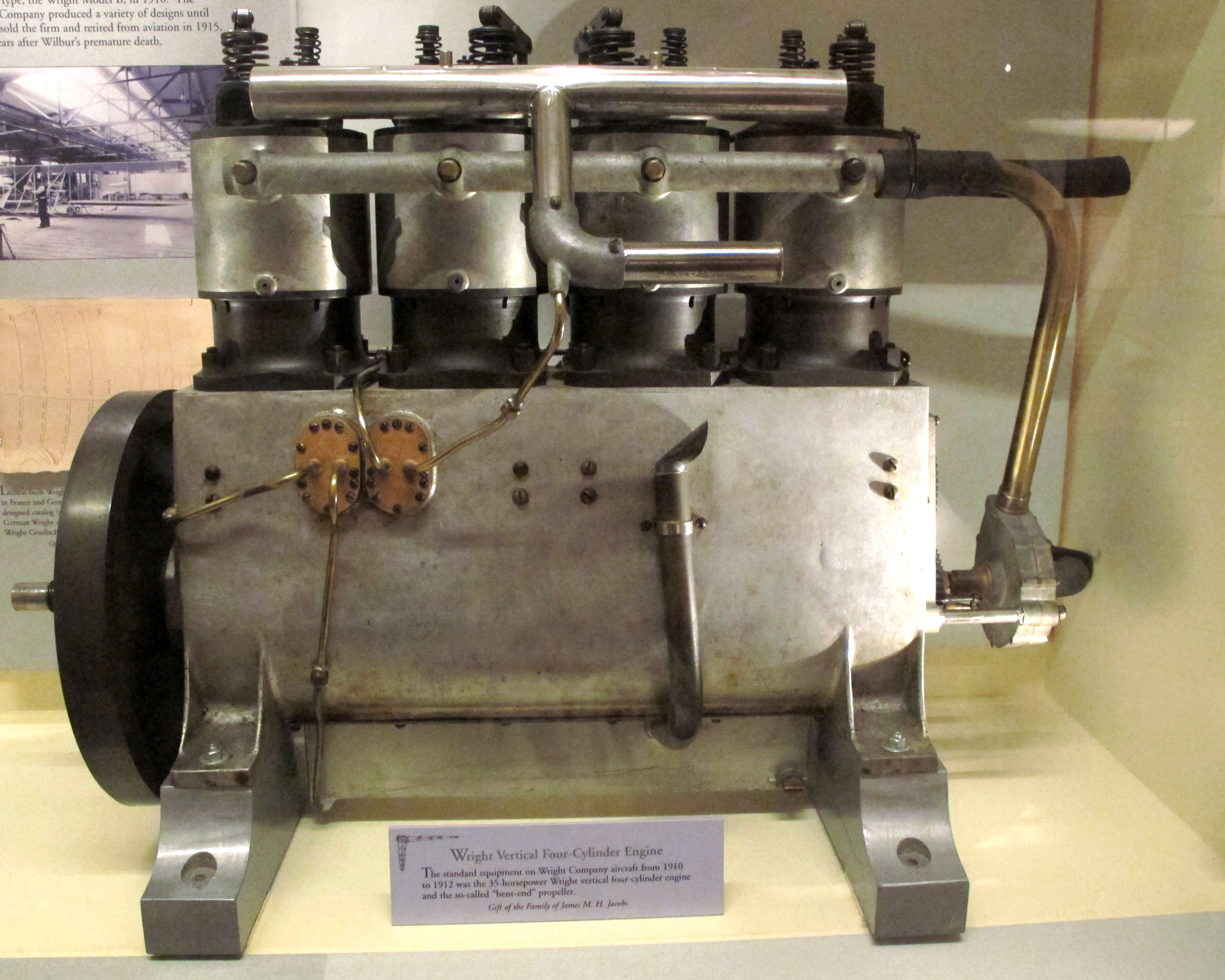
Right side view of the Wright Vertical 4 on display at the National Air and Space Museum. This engine was originally a keepsake of Orville Wright's.

Data from "Wright Vertical 4, In-line 4 Engine (inventory A19620037000)". Smithsonian National Air and Space Museum.

=== General characteristics ===
- Type: 4-cylinder, liquid-cooled inline piston aircraft engine
- Bore: 4.375 in (111 mm)
- Stroke: 4 in (102 mm)
- Displacement: 240 in^{3} (3.9 L)
- Length: 40.75 in (1,035 mm)
- Width: 18 in (457 mm)
- Height: 27 in (686 mm)
- Dry weight: 160–180 lb (70–80 kg)
- Designer: Orville Wright

=== Components ===
- Valvetrain: overhead valve, two valves per cylinder, "automatic" intake valve (driven by suction), exhaust valve actuated by camshaft and pushrod
- Cooling system: liquid-cooled

=== Performance ===
- Power output: Initially 28 hp (21 kW) at 1325 rpm, later up to 42 hp (31 kW) at 1500 rpm.

== Bibliography ==
- Hobbs, Leonard S. (1971). Smithsonian Annals of Flight, No. 5: The Wright Brothers' Engines and Their Design (PDF). Washington, D.C.: Smithsonian Institution Press.
- Lippincott, Harvey H. (1987). "Propulsion Systems of the Wright Brothers". In Wolko, Howard S. (ed.). The Wright Flyer: An Engineering Perspective. Washington, D.C.: Smithsonian Institution Press. pp. 87–89. ISBN 0-87474-979-4.
- McFarland, Marvin W., ed. (1953). The Papers of Wilbur and Orville Wright, Including the Chanute-Wright Letters and Other Papers of Octave Chanute. Vol. Two: 1906–1948. New York: McGraw-Hill. pp. 1215–1216.
