= Wright Model L =

American military biplane of 1916

Model L
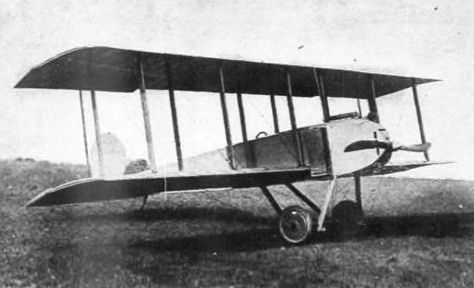

General information
- Type: Military reconnaissance aircraft
- National origin: United States
- Manufacturer: Wright Company

History
- First flight: 1916

The Wright Model L was a prototype high-speed reconnaissance aircraft built by the Wright Company in 1916 to meet a specification by the U.S. military. It bore no resemblance to previous Wright designs. (Note: The Illustrated Encyclopedia of Aircraft (1985, p.3098) describes the aircraft as a single-seat development of the Wright Model F. This is inconsistent with the various other sources cited here, as well as with photographs of the two types.) Already obsolete compared to European military aircraft of the time, it attracted no orders, and only the single prototype was built.

By the time it was brought to market, Orville Wright had already left the company. It would be the last aircraft built by the Wright Company before it merged with the Glenn L. Martin Company, and the last Wright aircraft built at Dayton.

== Design ==
The Model L was a two-bay unstaggered biplane with equal-span wings. The pilot sat in an open cockpit. A piston engine was mounted in the nose, which drove a tractor propeller mounted directly to it. It had a conventional tail and was fitted with fixed, tailskid undercarriage. Directional control was provided via ailerons. Aviation historian Richard P. Hallion described it as the "antithesis" of established Wright design.

== Specifications ==
Data from Hallion 2019, p.72

General characteristics

- Crew: 1
- Length: 24 ft 2 in (7.37 m)
- Wingspan: 29 ft 0 in (8.84 m)
- Height: 10 ft 6 in (3.20 m) (estimated)
- Wing area: 360 sq ft (33 m^{2}) (estimated)
- Empty weight: 1,577 lb (715 kg)
- Gross weight: 2,049 lb (929 kg) (approximate)
- Powerplant: 1 × Wright 6-60 six-cylinder, water-cooled, inline engine, 60 hp (45 kW)

Performance

- Maximum speed: 62.5 mph (100.6 km/h, 54.3 kn) (estimated)

== Notes ==
=== Bibliography ===
- Hallion, Richard P. (2019). The Wright Flyers 1899–1916. Oxford: Osprey.
- The Illustrated Encyclopedia of Aircraft. London: Aerospace Publishing.
- MacFarland, Marvin W. (1953). The Papers of Wilbur and Orville Wright, Including the Chanute-Wright Letters and Other Papers of Octave Chanute: Volume Two 1906–1948. New York: MacGraw–Hill.
- Roach, Edward J. (2014). The Wright Company: From Invention to Industry. Athens, OH: Ohio University Press.
- Taylor, Michael J. H. (1993). Jane's Encyclopedia of Aviation. London: Studio Editions.
