= Wright Model G =

American military flying boat of 1913

Model G Aeroboat
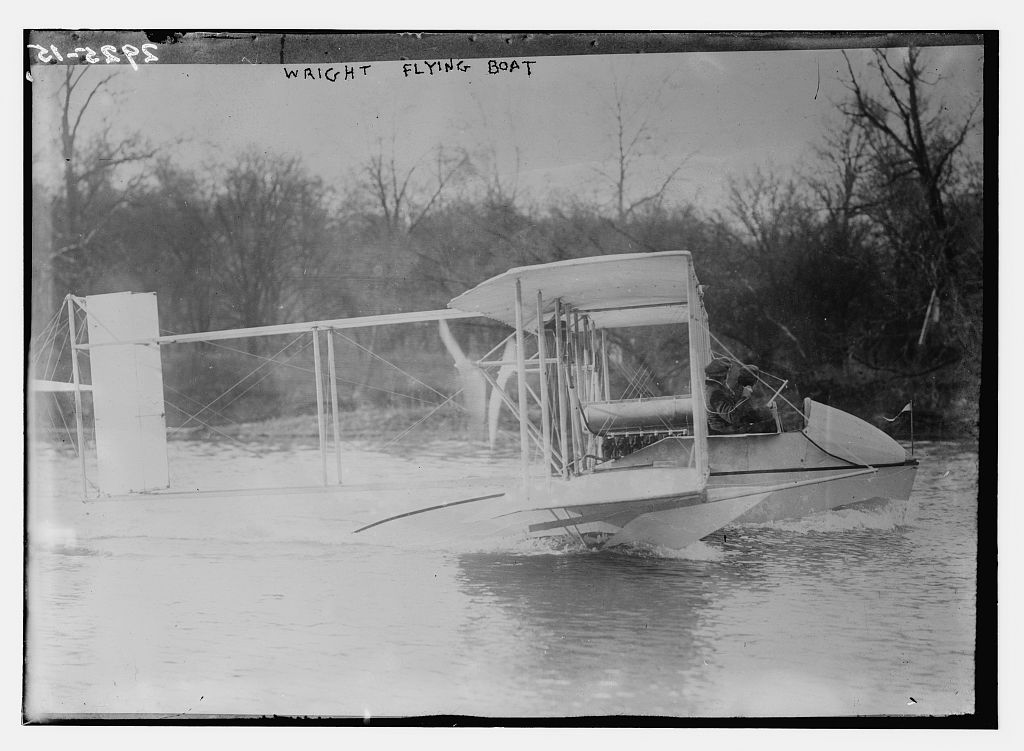

General information
- Type: Military flying boat
- National origin: United States
- Manufacturer: Wright Company
- Designer: Grover Loening
- Primary user: U.S. Navy

History
- First flight: 1913
- Developed into: Wright Model H Wright Model HS

The Wright Model G Aeroboat was a flying boat built in small numbers by the Wright Company in 1913. It represented an unsuccessful attempt by Wright to compete with the ubiquitous Curtiss Model F. One example was evaluated for U.S. Navy service, and allocated a naval serial number, but this did not lead to a production order. The Model G was the first aircraft to be fitted with a T-tail.

== Design ==
The Model G was a three-bay unstaggered biplane flying boat with equal-span wings. The pilot and a single passenger sat side-by-side in an open cockpit in the hull. A piston engine was mounted behind the cockpit, in the interplane gap, which powered two two-bladed pusher propellers via chain drives. Small stabilizer floats were mounted under the wings, initially at mid-span, but later moved to the wingtips. The horizontal stabilizer was originally mounted in a cruciform position on the fins, but later moved above them to create the first T-tail fitted to an aircraft. The Model G was originally fitted with a system of control levers, similar to earlier Wright designs, but the last ones built had control wheels that were emerging as the standard for aircraft control. The hull was built of metal.

== Development ==
The Wright Company had previously marketed seaplanes in the form of the Wright Model C-H floatplane. However, this machine's performance both in the air and on the water had proved disappointing. At the same time, rival firm Curtiss had achieved considerable success with their Model F flying boat. After an informal expression of interest from the U.S. Navy in evaluating a Wright flying boat, Orville Wright set designer Grover Loening to the task of designing the aircraft. It flew for the first time in 1913, and was test-flown by Orville, Loening, and Oscar Brindley on the Great Miami River.

Other than naval use, the Wright Company marketed it for recreational flying, and also hoped to sell it as a mailplane for use in Alaska and coastal areas.

Development of the design continued as the Wright Model H and Model HS.

== Operational history ==
The U.S. Navy purchased the first Model G built and assigned it the serial AH-19. It was tested for the Navy by Harry Atwood on Lake Erie in May 1914, and then by Lt. Harry Maxfield. Maxfield advised against purchasing the type, and no further interest by the Navy ensued.

Wright sold at least two other Model Gs: one to Atwood, and another to Ernie Hall. Captain J. William Hazelton of the New York National Guard also owned a "Wright-type flying boat" around this time, which might have been a Model G. He offered it to the Army for use in support of the Mexican Revolution, but the offer was not taken up.

On August 20, 1914, Orville Wright and passenger Lt. Kenneth Whiting narrowly escaped drowning when a Model G piloted by Wright crashed into the Great Miami River after one of its wings failed in flight.

== Operators ==
- United States Navy

== Specifications ==
Data from Hallion 2019, p.69

General characteristics

- Crew: 1
- Capacity: 1 passenger
- Length: 28 ft 8 in (8.74 m)
- Wingspan: 38 ft 0 in (11.58 m)
- Height: 8 ft 0 in (2.44 m)
- Wing area: 432 sq ft (40.1 m^{2})
- Empty weight: 1,200 lb (544 kg)
- Gross weight: 1,800 lb (816 kg)
- Powerplant: 1 × Wright 6-60 six-cylinder, water-cooled, inline engine, 60 hp (45 kW)

Performance

- Maximum speed: 60 mph (97 km/h, 52 kn) (estimated)

== Notes ==
=== Bibliography ===
- "The 60 H.P. Wright Aero-Boat". Flight. 6 (3). London: Flight: 56–58. January 17, 1914.
- Hallion, Richard P. (2019). The Wright Flyers 1899–1916. Oxford: Osprey.
- The Illustrated Encyclopedia of Aircraft. London: Aerospace Publishing.
- Roach, Edward J. (2014). The Wright Company: From Invention to Industry. Athens, OH: Ohio University Press.
- Swanborough, Gordon; Bowers, Peter M. (1990). United States Navy Aircraft Since 1911. London: Putnam.
- Taylor, Michael J. H. (1993). Jane's Encyclopedia of Aviation. London: Studio Editions.
