= Wright Model A =

Early Wright Brothers aircraft

Wright Model A/Military Flyer
- Wright Military Flyer at the Smithsonian National Air and Space Museum

General information
- Type: Demonstrator/trainer
- Manufacturer: Wright Company
- Number built: c. 60

History
- First flight: 1908
- Variant: Wright Model B

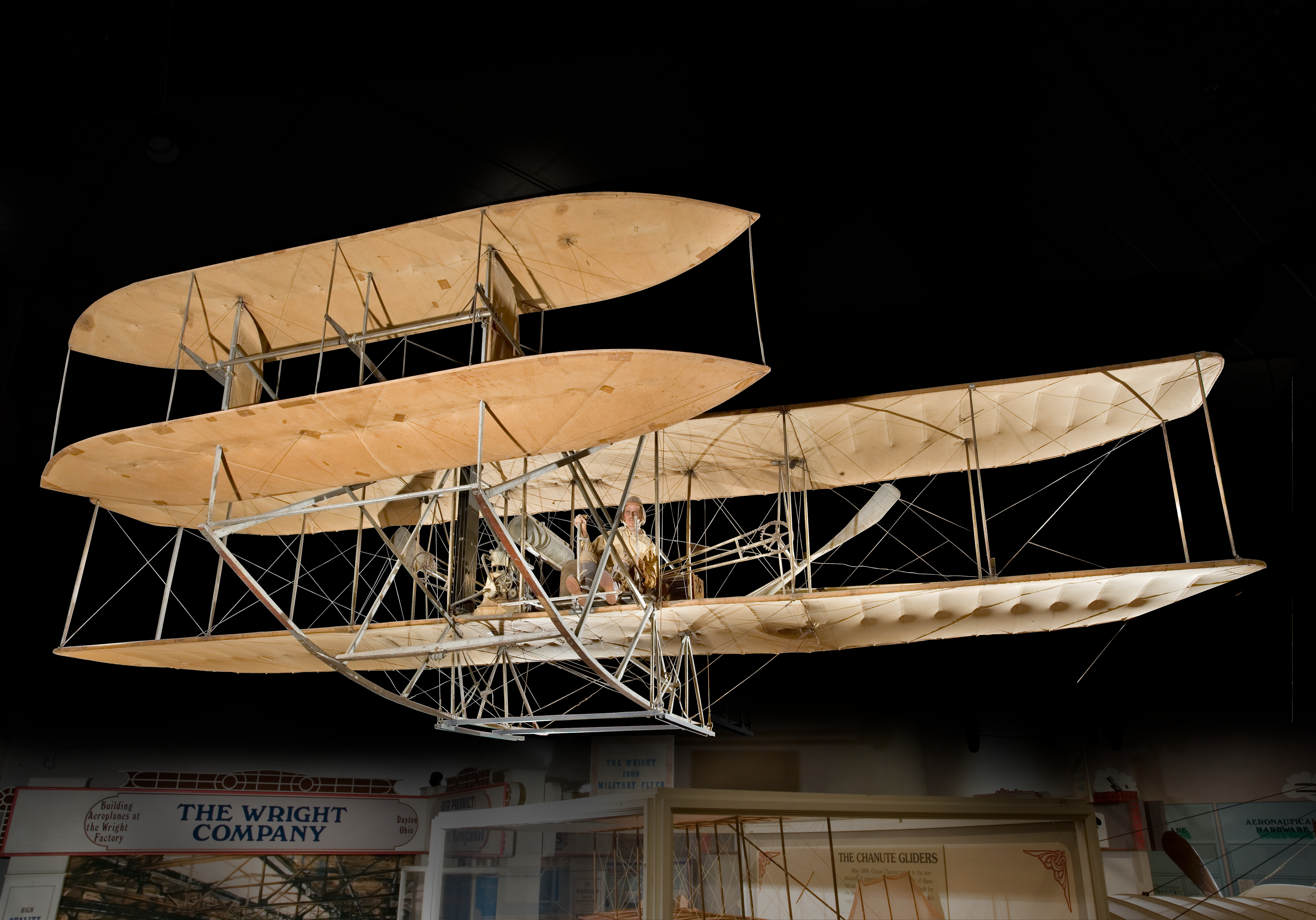
Three-quarter left front view from below of the Wright Type A Military (Signal Corps No.1) hanging on display in the darkened Early Flight exhibit, Smithsonian National Air and Space Museum

The Wright Model A is an early aircraft produced by the Wright Brothers in the United States beginning in 1906. It was a development of their Flyer III airplane of 1905. The Wrights built about seven Model A aircraft in their bicycle shop during the period 1906–1907, in which they did no flying. One of these was shipped to Le Havre in 1907 in order to demonstrate it to the French. The Model A had a 35-horsepower (26 kW) 4 cylinder engine with twin wooden propellers and controls adapted for upright seating for two. Except for the seats and control levers, it was identical to the 1905 airplane. The Model A was the first aircraft the Wrights offered for sale and the first aircraft design to enter serial production anywhere in the world. Apart from the seven machines the Wrights built themselves in 1906–1907, they sold licenses for production in Europe with the largest number of Model A's actually being produced in Germany by Flugmaschine Wright GmbH, which built about 60 examples.

The 1909 Military Flyer was a one-of-a-kind Model A. With wings shortened two feet, higher skid undercarriage and the same engine salvaged from the 1908 Wright Military Flyer wrecked at Fort Myer, it differed from the standard Wright A in size and was faster. The aircraft was demonstrated at Fort Myer, Virginia, beginning June 28, 1909 for the Aeronautical Division of the U.S. Army Signal Corps, which offered a contract of $25,000 ($895,833 in 2022 dollars) for an aircraft capable of flying at 40 miles per hour (64 km/h), with two people on board, and a distance of 125 miles (201 km). After rigorous trials the Signal Corps accepted the airplane as "Signal Corps (S.C.) No. 1", August 2, 1909, and paid the brothers $30,000 ($1,075,000 in 2022 US dollars).

== Engineering design and innovation ==
The Wright Model A represented a major step in the development of systematic engineering. The brothers studied prior aeronautical work and experimented with their own models. To test wing designs, they built a small wind tunnel, one of the earliest such devices, which gave them pioneering insight into lift, drag, and thrust. The Wrights differed from their contemporaries, who repeatedly attempted full scale flights before validating their designs.

The Wrights introduced an innovative control system which consisted of separate pitch, roll, and yaw control surfaces. The Model A's combination of wing warping for roll control, forward elevator for pitch control, and rear rudder for yaw control enabled stable controlled flight.

Modern study of the Wright Flyer III, which was a prototype for the Model A, illustrates the Wrights' data-driven methodology. Researchers examined the handling challenges of the Flyer III in 1904-1905. These studies showed that changes the Wrights made to wing camber, rudder linkage, and center of gravity significantly improved controllability. The Model A was not a random design, but rather, was a product created through experimentation, based on aerodynamic principles. It represents the Wrights' transition from inventors to engineers.

== Designation ==
The aircraft were not referred to as 'Model A' by the Wrights, but the term was likely created by the U.S. Army after purchasing a Flyer of 1909 and purchasing later Model B's. At different times prior to 1909 the aircraft were called the following: 'Wilbur Wright machine', 'Wright 1905 Flyer', and by later surviving Wright pilots and personnel 'twin-propellered Wright with head' ('the head' referring to the front elevator). As more Wright models were built after 1910 their natural designations became B, C, D etc. to differentiate one model from the other. Later aviation historians and biographers continued with 'Model A' in providing a chronological timeline for each of the different model of Wright aircraft.

== Testing and development process ==
After 1905, the Wright brothers conducted multiple field tests trying to improve the Model A, they did this by learning from earlier failures and successful glider experiments. Modern accounts show that the testing from 1908 to 1909, was one of the earliest applications of evolved prototypes in aviation history. The brothers focused on testing to measure the performance of consistency, endurance, and control responsiveness. They did this through fieldwork that was combined with ground testing and repeated flight trials. Due to the brothers' knowledge and efforts, the Model A was able to become commercially successful, the first aircraft to enter small batch manufacturing.

Engineering experts suggest that through these tests they saw that the brothers had a high emphasis on safety and reliability. For example, the brothers compared data from their wind tunnel experiments to actual flight performances, allowing them to adjust propeller pitches, engine torque and control sensitivity. Through the left behind aeronautical journals of the brothers that were reconstructed, it is shown their process is further backed up by how they learned lessons from early flight. This showed them instabilities they were able to redesign such as the rudder control system, enhanced elevator authority, and redistributed weight to prevent pitch oscillations. These tests were crucial for the military trials at Fort Myers, which is where the Model A was shown as acceptable to meet the U.S. Army Signal Corps’ requirements. The army’s requirements for a suitable and sustainable flight was to have a good fixed speed and distance. Therefore this is what the Wrights focused on in the Model A, promoting efficiency and structural durability. Due to the aircraft, the Signal Corps No. 1 was designed which became the first military airplane accepted into service. This was to show the Wrights design and testing methods, aligned with those of professional engineering standards.

== Individual control arrangement ==
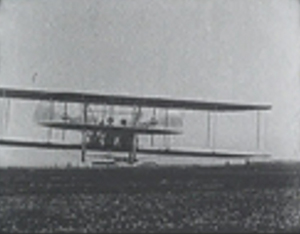
Wilbur Wright flying a Model A in France 1909.

Wilbur and Orville Wright devised slightly different flight controls in the Model A airplanes they flew separately in France and the United States for their 1908 and 1909 public demonstrations. The Smithsonian Institution's National Air and Space Museum refers to "The Wilbur Method" and "The Orville Method". In the Wilbur Method, the roll and yaw controls were combined on the same lever at the pilot's right hand. A forward-backward movement controlled the rudder, while a sideways or left-and-right motion controlled wing-warping. In the Orville Method, moving the stick controlled wing-warping, while a knob atop the stick controlled the rudder. In both methods the left-hand lever operated the forward elevator to control pitch. Wilbur trained French and Italian pilots using his method, and Orville trained German pilots while in Germany in 1909 for the Wright GmbH as well as American pilots at the Wright Company flight school using his method.

== Surviving aircraft ==
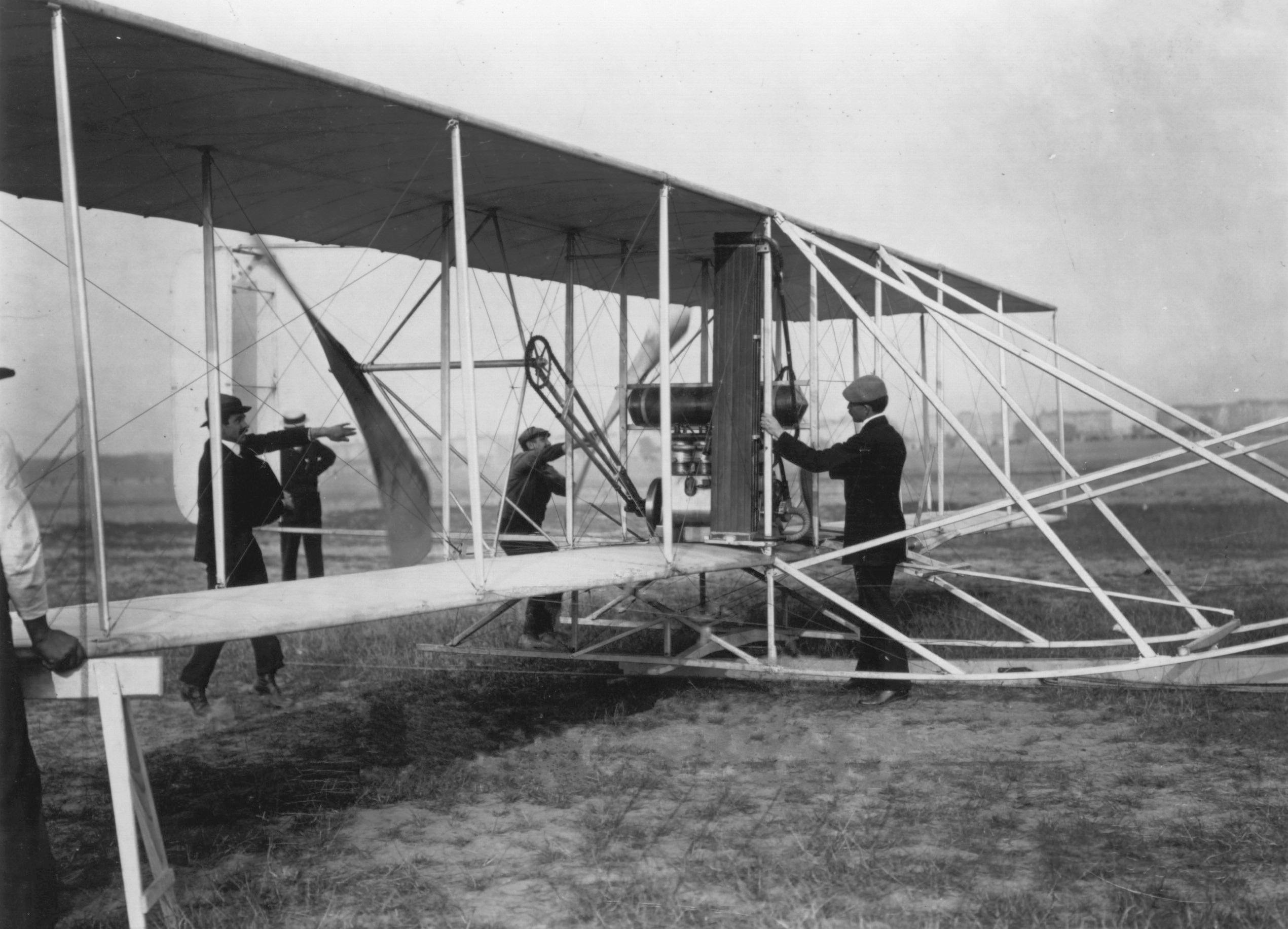
Orville Wright and Model A, Tempelhof Field, Berlin September 1909. This machine is now preserved in the Deutsches Museum, Munich, Germany.

- Wright Flyer III was itself the prototype in 1908. Flyer III was restored in the late 1940s back into its original 1905 configuration.
- The original Wright Military Model A plane (Signal Corps No. 1) is now on display at the National Air and Space Museum in Washington, DC. S.C. No. 1 had been significantly modified by the addition of wheels for landing gear and the movement of the elevators, but was restored by the Wright Company to its original configuration before donation to the museum. It is displayed in much the original condition as when the Smithsonian received it in October 1911. The aircraft was displayed in the National History Museum, then protected in Luray, Virginia during WWII, and is now in the Early Flight gallery in the Air and Space Museum.
- The only original standard Model A to survive, and the sole surviving original Dayton-built example, is the one Orville Wright used to demonstrate at Tempelhof, Germany, in September 1909. Donated by August Scherl, it resides in the Deutsches Museum, Munich. The engine is French-made, from fr:Bariquand et Marre.

== Legacy ==
The Wright brothers Model A had a major influence far beyond the lifespan of the aircraft. As chronicled in Ian Mackersey’s “The Wright Brothers : The Aviation Pioneers Who Changed the World", the Model A helped influence the early evolution of military and commercial aviation. Due to the licensing and distribution of the aircraft, this allowed for Europe's rapid growth in their early aviation industry. This was particularly shown through Germany’s Flugmaschine Wright GmbH, which produced approximately sixty units. These aircraft, allowed for a training foundation of many of Europe’s first pilots and engineers. This created an acceleration of aeronautical research and cross national collaborations. The Model A’s configuration also contributed to the introduced design standards which stayed constant throughout the first generation of powered aircraft. Through their usage of lightweight materials, dual propellers, and a forward-mounted elevator system which demonstrated the viability of logical weight distribution and aerodynamic control. These concepts are what led to the Wrights' later model called the Wright Model B. Additionally, the Wrights' commitment to data collection and intellectual design, set an example for the later generation of simulations, models, and testing that continue to be developed in aerospace technology today.

Beyond the Model A’s major importance in engineering, it also holds historical significance as the embodiment of the Wright brothers, reflecting their philosophy of innovation through logical experiments. Through their design methods, persistence over failure, and reliance on scientific testing over intuition, continue to be foundational lessons in engineering education. Lots of historians consider their process the first instance of applying what is called system engineering to flight technology. The aircraft's legacy is not only shown in museums and replicas but also in modern engineering values showing where the Wright's integrated creativity, analysis, and precision still continue to be a model for ambitious engineers.

== Reproductions ==
- An exact reproduction of the 1909 Military Flyer is on display in the National Museum of the United States Air Force in Dayton, Ohio. This reproduction was constructed in 1955 by museum personnel. It is equipped with an original engine personally donated for the reproduction by Orville Wright, while the chains, sprockets, and propellers were all donated by the heirs of the Wright estate, and have been added to the replica as they have been received and restored.
- In 2008 Ken Hyde built an exact replica of the original 1908 Wright Military Flyer which itself was one of the Dayton 7. This was for the 100th anniversary and remembrance of Orville Wright's first trip to Fort Myer and also the death of Thomas Selfridge. Hyde has said in press reports that his reproduction is flyable but for now it will only exist in static display.

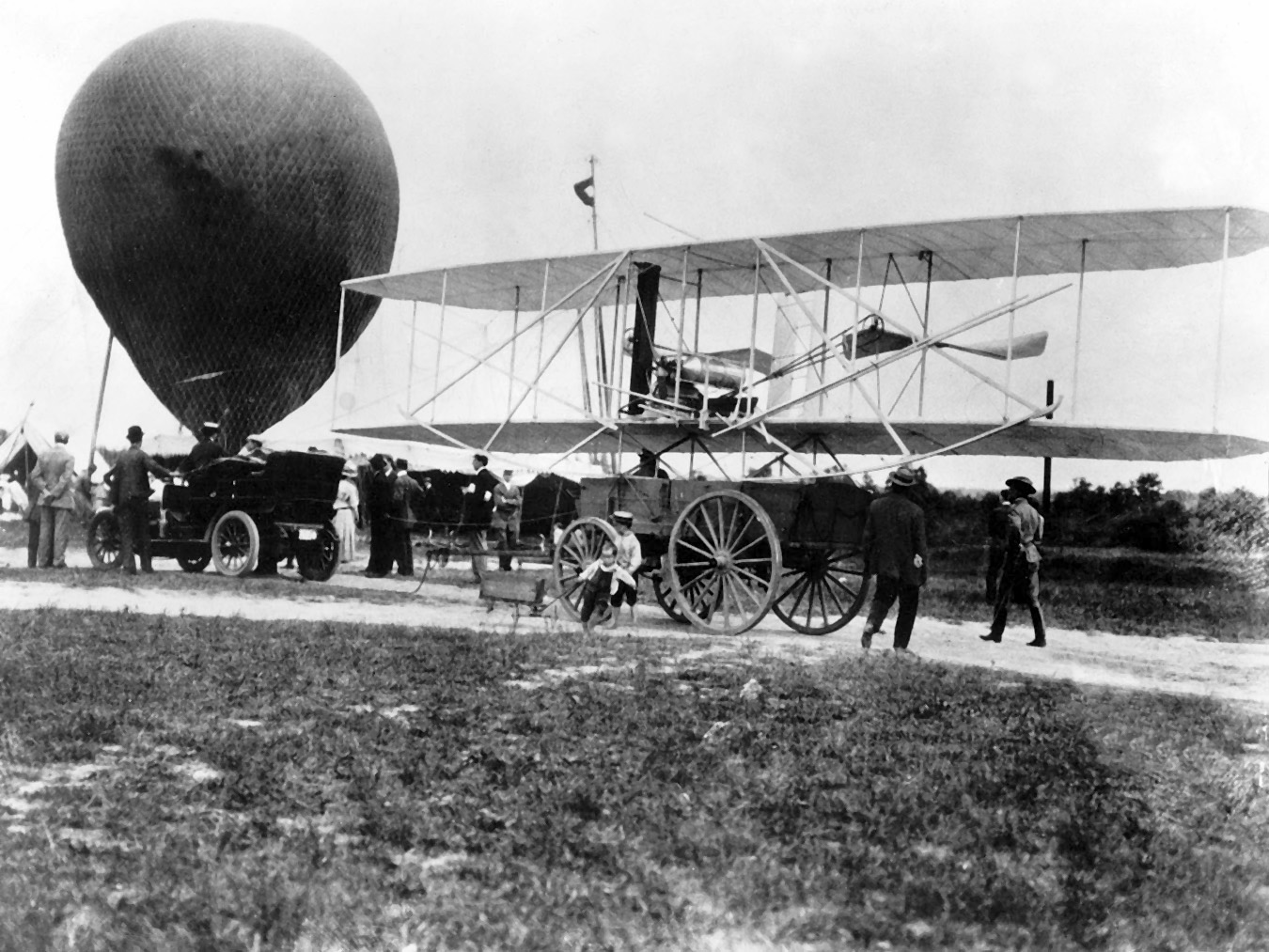
On 1 September 1908 the Wright Military Flyer arrives aboard a wagon at Fort Myer, Virginia, attracting the attention of children and adults

== Operators ==
United States of America

- Aeronautical Division, U.S. Signal Corps

== Specifications (Wright Military Flyer) ==
Data from US Army Aircraft 1908–1946

General characteristics

- Crew: 2
- Length: 30 ft 8 in (9.35 m)
- Wingspan: 36 ft 5 in (11.10 m)
- Height: 8 ft 0 in (2.44 m)
- Empty weight: 740 lb (336 kg)
- Gross weight: 1,263 lb (573 kg)
- Powerplant: 1 × Wright Vertical 4 4-cylinder water-cooled in-line piston engine, 35 hp (26 kW)
- Propellers: 2-bladed Painted spruce elliptical propellers, 8 ft 8 in (2.64 m) diameter (2 of, rotating in opposite directions)

Performance

- Maximum speed: 42 mph (68 km/h, 36 kn)

== See also ==
Related development

- British Army Aeroplane No 1 – designed and built by Samuel Cody (1908)
- Grade monoplane
- 1902 Glider
- Wright Flyer
- Flyer II
- Flyer III
- Wright Model B
- Early flying machines
