= Wright Model H =

Model H
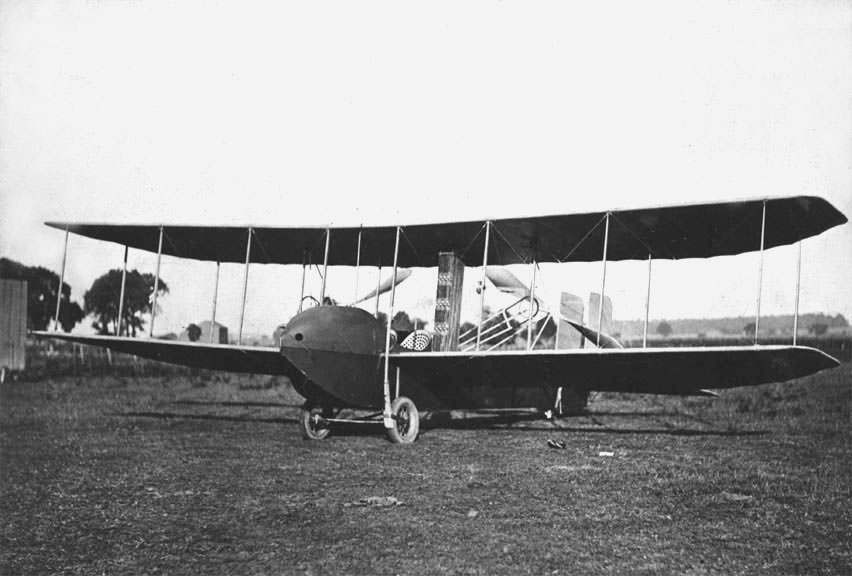
- A Model H at Simms Station Dayton OH in 1914

General information
- Type: Pioneering aircraft
- National origin: United States
- Manufacturer: The Wright Company
- Primary user: Pancho Villa
- Number built: 5

History
- First flight: 1914
- Developed from: Wright Model H

The Wright Model H and Wright Model HS were enclosed fuselage aircraft built by the Wright Company

== Design and development ==
A direct development of the Model F, the Model H introduced side by side seating for the two pilots, with long-span wings similar to the Model F. A short-span version was also produced as the Model HS, marketed as a "Military Flyer" with the improvement of an enclosed fuselage and dual controls. Its wings were shorter than the Model H for increased speed.

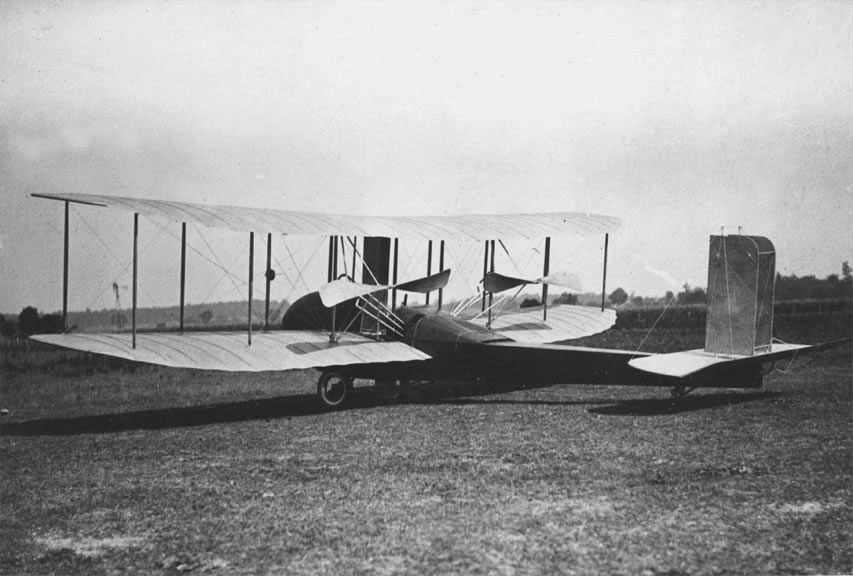
3/4 rear view of a Model H

The Model H was a two place, side-by-side configuration seating, open cockpit, biplane with twin rudders, powered with a single engine, propelled by two chain driven pusher propellers. The engine was fully enclosed in the nose of the aircraft with a driveshaft running rearward to the propeller drive chains.

== Operational history ==
Howard Reinhart purchased a Wright Model HS for Pancho Villa, who hired him in support of his insurgent force. It was one of three aircraft in his small air force.

In 2003, a Wright propeller matching the Model HS specifications was auctioned for over US$25,000. The construction of the propeller was hand carved wood with a linen covering, metal tips and a custom finish.

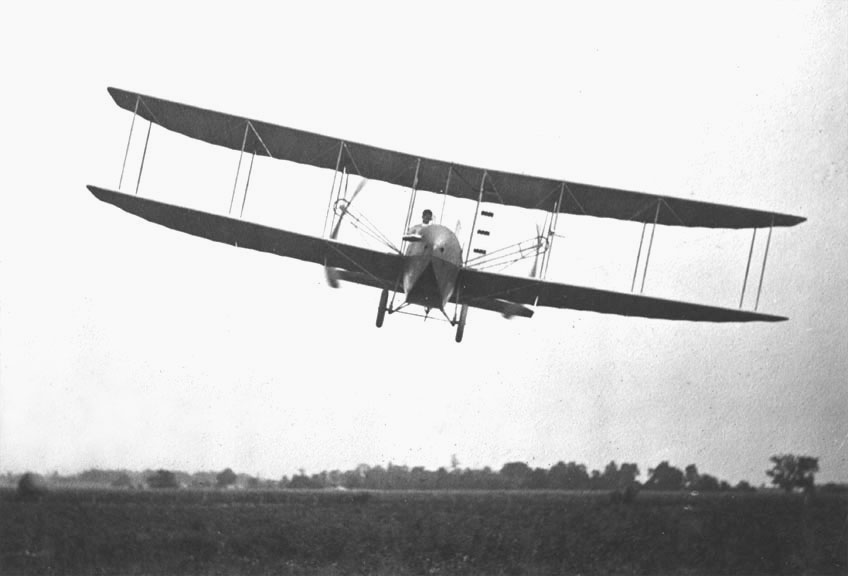
A Model H in flight at Simms Station, Dayton OH in 1914

== Variants ==
Model H
(1914) 32 ft (9.8 m) span 3-bay wings similar to the Model F, also introduced side-by-side seating.
Model HS
(1915) Short span 26 ft 6 in (8.08 m) 2-bay wings

== Specifications (Wright Model HS) ==
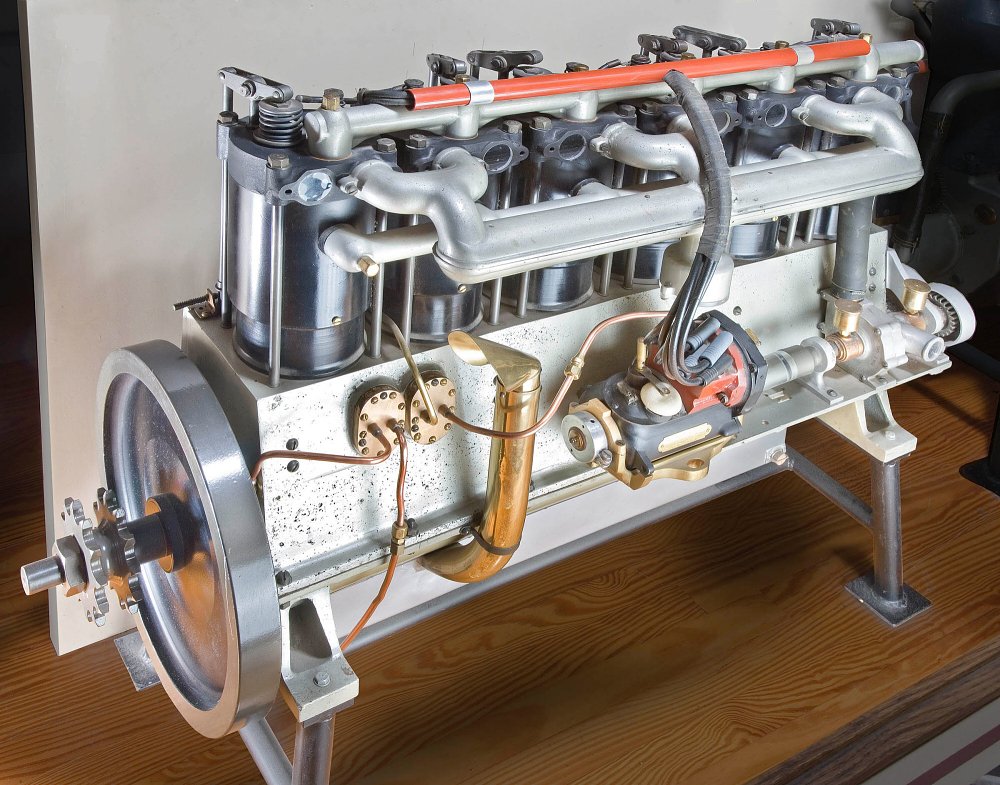
a Wright 6-60 on display at the Smithsonian

Data from Flying

General characteristics

- Crew: 2
- Length: 26 ft 6 in (8.08 m)
- Wingspan: 32 ft (9.8 m)
- Height: 9 ft (2.7 m)
- Wing area: 350 sq ft (33 m^{2})
- Powerplant: 1 × Wright 6-60 6-cylinder water cooled inline piston, 60 hp (45 kW)
- Propellers: 2-bladed pusher propellers aft of the wings, 8 ft 6 in (2.59 m) diameter

Performance

- Maximum speed: 70 mph (110 km/h, 61 kn)
- Stall speed: 30 mph (48 km/h, 26 kn)
- Rate of climb: 400 ft/min (2.0 m/s)
