= Wright Model R =

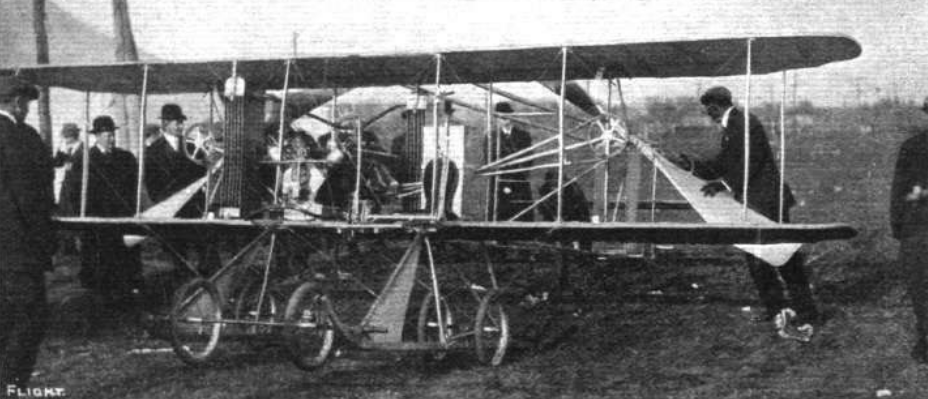
- The "Baby Grand" at Belmont Park.

General information
- Type: Racing aircraft
- National origin: United States
- Manufacturer: Wright Company

History
- First flight: 1910
- Developed from: Wright Model B

The Wright Model R was a single-seat biplane built by the Wright Company in Dayton, Ohio, United States, in 1910. Also known as the Roadster or the Baby Wright, it was designed for speed and altitude competitions.

== Design ==
The Wright Model R was derived from the Wright Model B, and was a two-bay biplane with rear-mounted twin rudders mounted in front of a single elevator and carried on wire-braced wood booms behind the wing. It was powered by a 30 hp (22 kW) Wright four-cylinder inline water-cooled engine driving a pair of pusher propellers via chains.

== Operational history ==
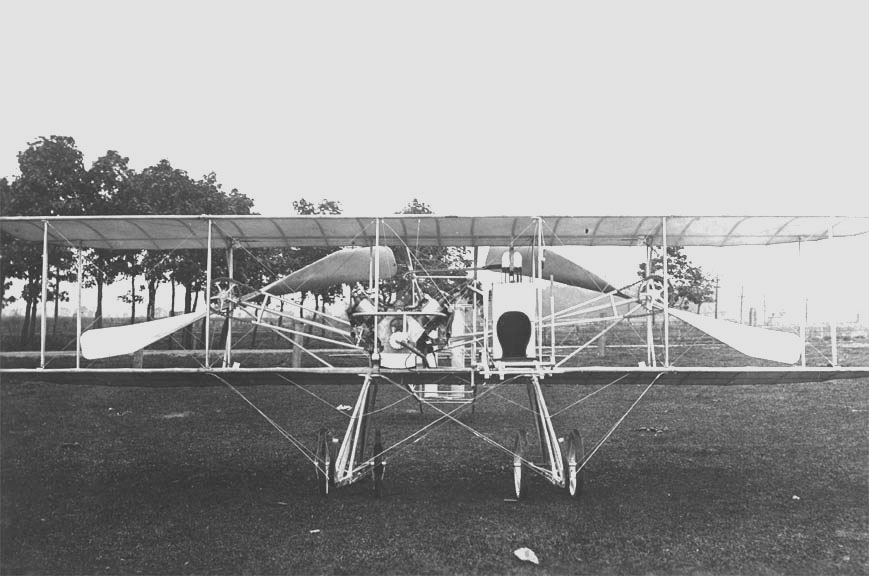
The "Baby Grand" at Simms Station, Ohio.

Two examples were flown at the International Aviation Tournament at Belmont Park in November 1910, one being a standard model flown by Alec Ogilvie and the other being a special competition model known as the Baby Grand, which had a 60 hp (45 kW) V-8 engine and a reduced wingspan of 21 ft 5 in (6.53 m). Orville Wright succeeded in flying the Baby Grand at a speed of nearly 70 mph (110 km/h). Both aircraft were entered for the second Gordon Bennett Trophy competition which was held at the meeting, but the Baby Grand, flown by Walter Brookins, suffered an engine failure during a trial flight on the race day and crashed heavily. Ogilvie's aircraft also had engine problems, having to make a stop of nearly an hour to make repairs, but was nevertheless placed third.

Ogilvie also flew his aircraft in the 1912 Gordon Bennet competition, re-engined with a 50 hp (37 kW) N.E.C. engine.

== Specifications ==
Data from "1910 Wright Model R".

General characteristics

- Crew: 1
- Length: 27 ft (8.2 m)
- Wingspan: 26 ft 6 in (8.08 m)
- Wing area: 185 sq ft (17.2 m^{2})
- Powerplant: 1 × Wright Vertical 4 water-cooled piston engine, 30 hp (22 kW)
- Propellers: 2-bladed x2 chain driven pusher, 8 ft 6 in (2.59 m) diameter

Performance
