= Wright Model EX =

Early biplane built by the Wright Brothers

Model EX
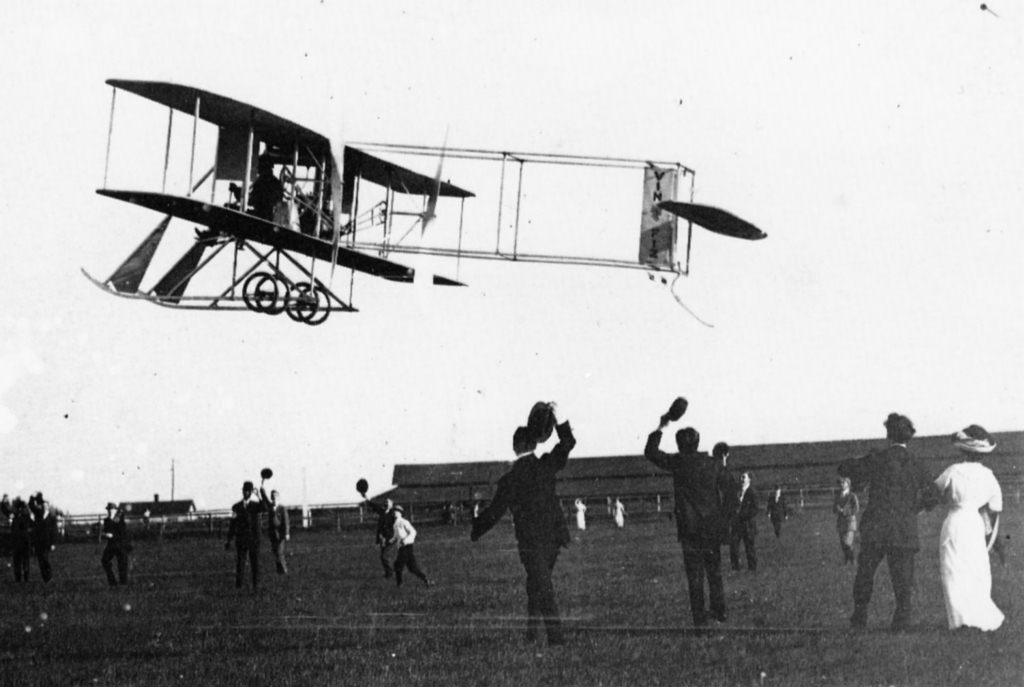
- The Vin Fiz Flyer starts its cross-country trip from the Sheepshead Bay Race Track in Brooklyn, N.Y.

General information
- Type: Biplane
- National origin: United States
- Manufacturer: Wright Company
- Status: On display
- Number built: 2 (also one owned by Howard W. Gill)

History
- First flight: 1911
- Developed from: Wright Model B

The Wright Model EX is an early biplane built by the Wright Brothers. It is a scaled-down, single-seat derivative of the Wright Model B designed specifically for exhibition flying (hence the "EX" designation). Two examples were built. One of them—the Vin Fiz Flyer—in 1911 became the first aircraft to fly coast-to-coast across the U.S., a journey that took almost three months.

== Design ==
The Model EX was a three-bay, unstaggered biplane with equal-span wings. A tail with twin rudders was carried on an open truss. The pilot sat next to the engine on the leading edge of the lower wing, and power was supplied to two two-bladed pusher propellers via chain drives. The undercarriage consisted of long skids that extended far to the front of the aircraft, and which were each fitted with dual mainwheels. A tailskid protruded to the rear of the aircraft.

The Model EX would be the first Wright design manufactured completely at their new factory.

== History ==
The publisher William Randolph Hearst had offered a US$50,000 prize to the first aviator to fly coast to coast, in either direction, in less than 30 days from start to finish.

Calbraith Perry Rodgers, grandnephew of naval hero Oliver Hazard Perry and an avid yachtsman and motorcycle racer, had taken about 90 minutes of instruction from Orville Wright in June 1911 before soloing, and had won an $11,000 air endurance prize in a contest in August. Rodgers became the first private citizen to buy a Wright airplane, a Wright Model B modified and called the Model EX. The plane's 35 horsepower (26 kilowatt) engine allowed a speed of 50 miles per hour (80 km/h) at 1,000 feet (300 meters).

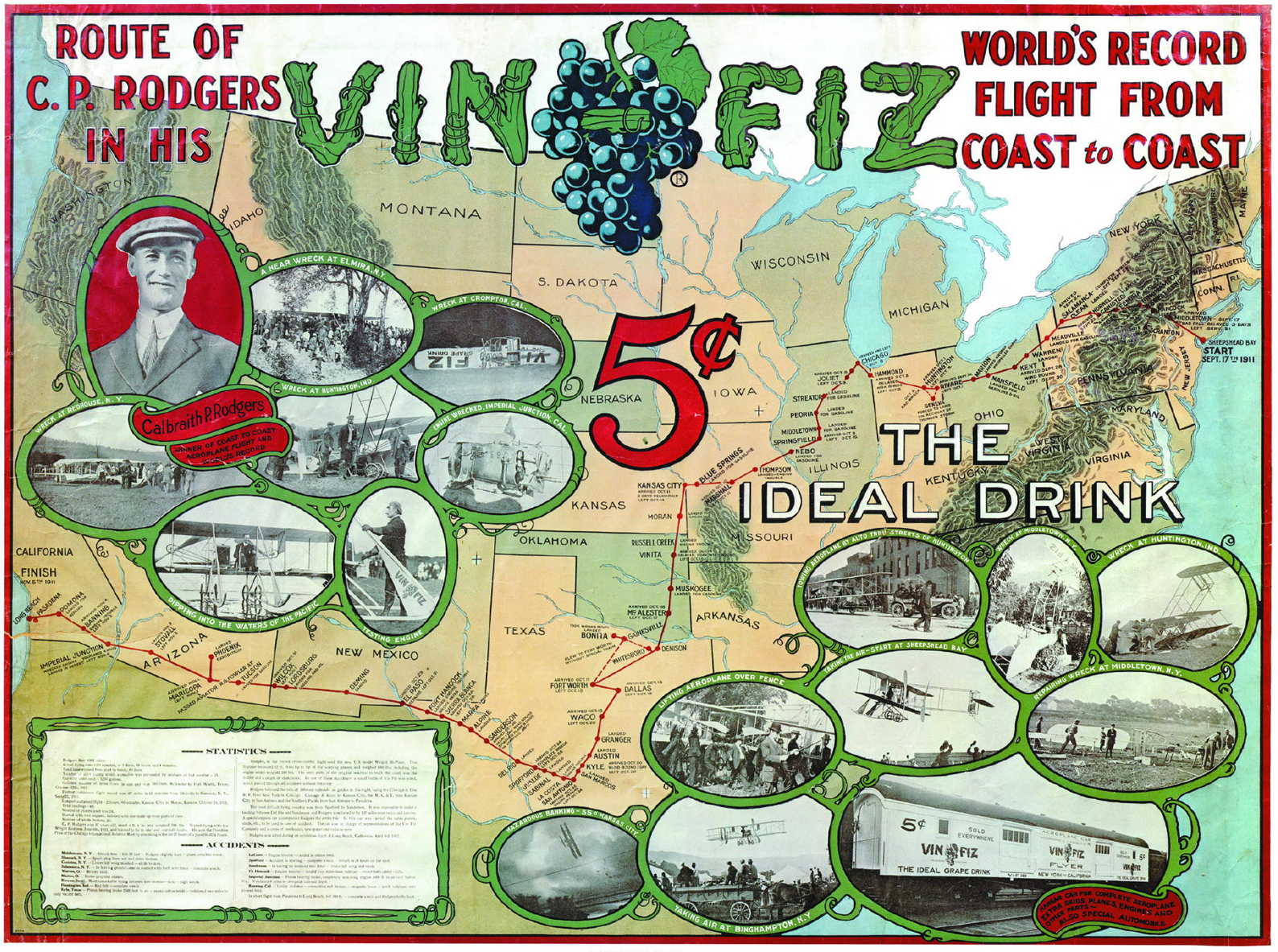
Vin Fiz American transcontinental flight advertisement poster

Since the airplane would need a considerable support crew, Rodgers persuaded J. Ogden Armour, of meatpacking fame, to sponsor the attempt, and in return named the plane after Armour's new grape soft drink Vin Fiz. The support team rode on a three-car train called the Vin Fiz Special, and included Charlie Taylor, the Wright brothers' bicycle shop and aircraft mechanic, who built their first and later engines and knew every detail of Wright airplane construction; Rodgers' wife Mabel; his mother; reporters; and employees of Armour and Vin Fiz.

The flight began at 4:30 pm, September 17, 1911, when Rodgers took off from the Sheepshead Bay Race Track in Brooklyn, New York. Although the plan called for a large number of stops along the way, in the end there were 75, including 16 crashes, and Rodgers was injured several times. Taylor and the team of mechanics rebuilt the Vin Fiz Flyer when necessary, and only a few pieces of the original plane actually made the entire trip.

On November 5, having missed the prize deadline by 19 days, Rodgers landed at Tournament Park in Pasadena, California, in front of a crowd of 20,000. On the 12th he took off for Long Beach, California, but crashed at Compton, with a brain concussion and a spinal twist. He was hospitalized for three weeks. Finally, on December 10 he landed on the beach, and taxied the Flyer into the Pacific Ocean, completing the unprecedented journey of over 4,000 statute miles (6,400 km). Actual flying time totalled under 84 hours. Rodgers was killed in an air crash on the Pacific shore of the US shortly after the flight across the US.

The aircraft was acquired by the Smithsonian Institution in 1934, and eventually joined the collection of the National Air and Space Museum, after being fully restored for display by the Smithsonian in 1960. As of August 2009, the plane was still on display at the NASM but was undergoing further conservation.

In 1961, to commemorate the 50th anniversary of the first trans-continental flight, aviation historian and Boeing aeronautical engineer Peter M. Bowers built a reproduction of the Vin Fiz. Built to airworthy standards, the plane was flown as a towed glider, and subsequently became a display in the San Diego Air and Space Museum, where it remains (as of 2022).

In 1986 the Vin Fiz Flyer flight was re-enacted in a replica to celebrate the 75th anniversary of the original journey. The pilot was materials scientist Jim Lloyd.

=== Mail ===
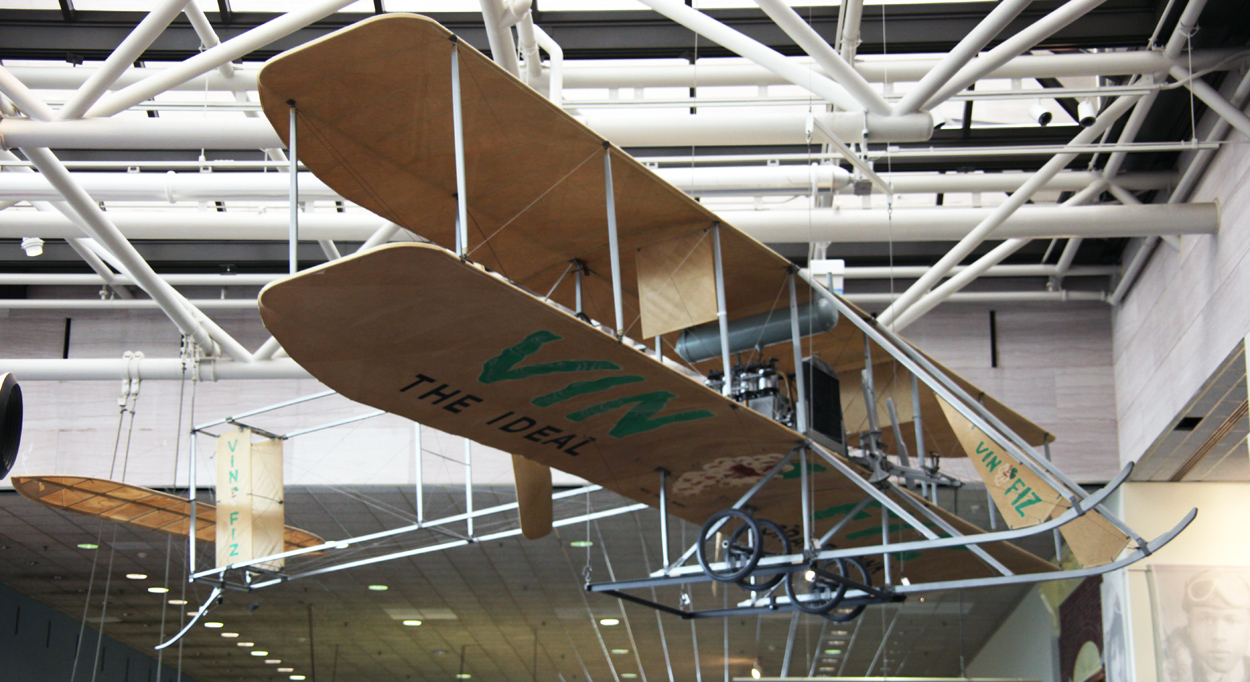
The Vin Fiz Flyer on display in the Smithsonian National Air and Space Museum in 2012

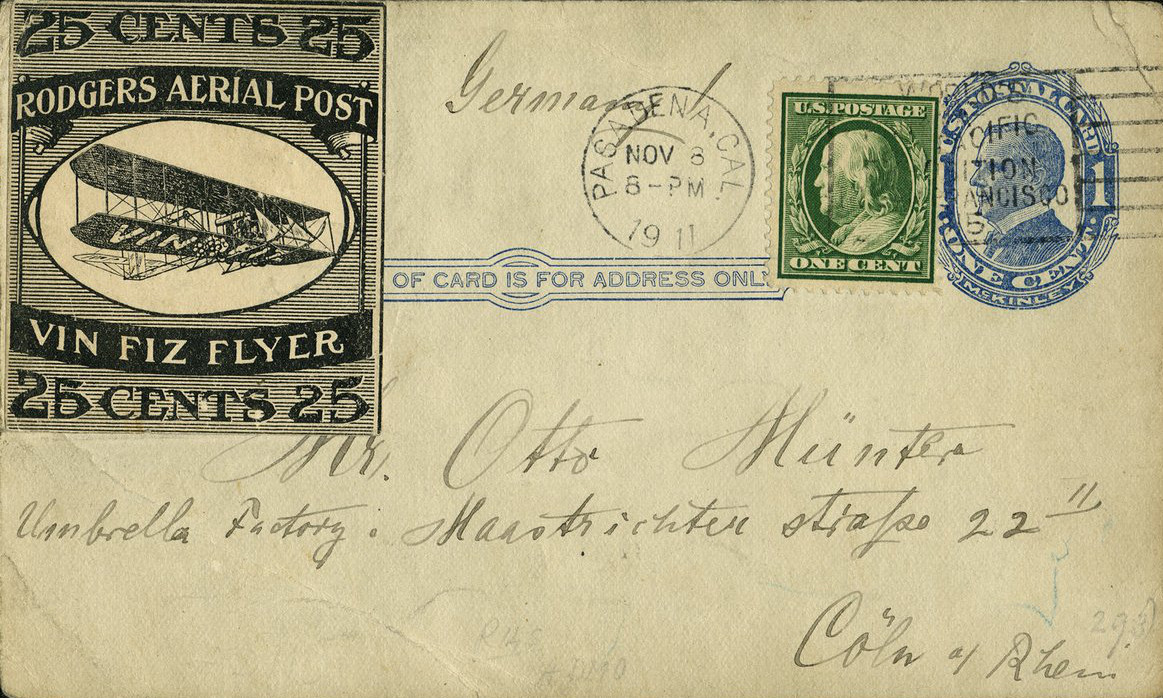
Vin Fiz Flyer stamp (upper left) on an envelope postmarked 1911

In addition to the Vin Fiz endorsement, Mabel Rodgers used the flight to promote an airmail service, and sold special 25-cent postage stamps for items to be carried on the airplane. They were semi-official - the Post Office tolerated them, but insisted that mail carry regular stamps as well. The stamps were large, inscribed "RODGERS AERIAL POST" and "VIN FIZ FLYER", with a picture of the airplane in the center. It is believed that they were ordered by Cal's brother, Robert S. Rodgers, from a printer in Kansas City, Missouri, and they were probably first available around October 14.

Twelve Vin Fiz Flyer stamps are known to exist today - seven on postcards, one on a cover, and four individuals. One of the cards sold in 1999 for $88,000. Another one of the cards was only recently discovered; it was bought at an Internet auction for several hundred dollars, then auctioned by Siegel in December 2001 for $44,000.

Shreves Philatelic Galleries, Inc. held a specialized auction "The Pioneers Of Flight Collection" on Nov. 29, 2006 selling four stamps: the only one on cover for $70,000 and three on postcards (for $60,000, $60,000 and $47,500).

== Specifications (Vin Fiz Flyer) ==
Data from NASA

General characteristics

- Crew: 1
- Length: 21 ft (6.4 m)
- Wingspan: 32 ft (9.8 m)
- Height: 7 ft (2.1 m)
- Gross weight: 903 lb (410 kg)
- Powerplant: 1 × Wright Aero Four cylinder four cycle, 35 hp (26 kW)
- Propellers: 2-bladed

Performance

- Cruise speed: 44 kn (51 mph, 82 km/h) average groundspeed
