= Wright Model E =

1913 aircraft

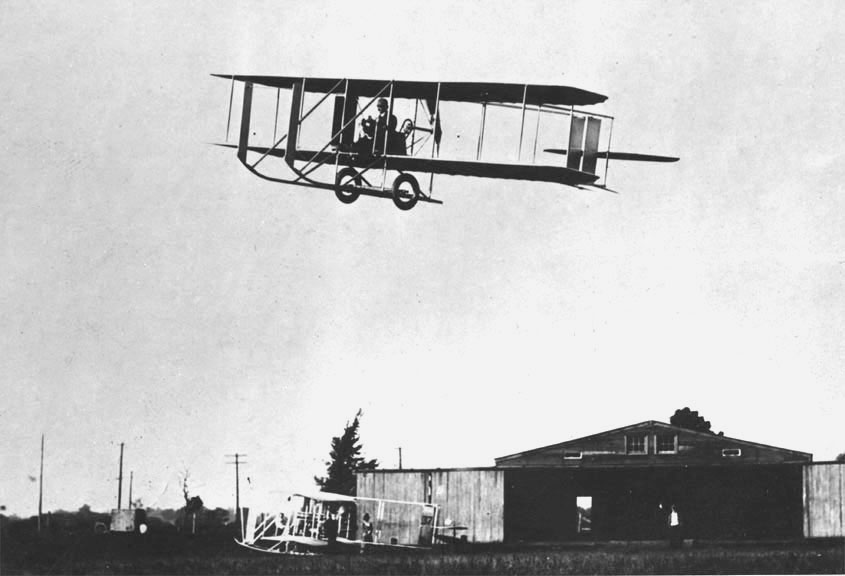
- Wright Model E, over Simms Station near Dayton, Ohio, 1913

General information
- Type: Biplane
- National origin: United States of America
- Manufacturer: Wright Company
- Designer: Wright brothers
- Number built: 1

History
- First flight: 1913

The Wright Model E was the first in the series of Wright Flyers that used a single propeller. The aircraft was also the test demonstrator for the first automatic pilot control.

== Design ==
The Model E featured 24 inch tires. It was flown with four and six cylinder Wright engines.

The model E was fitted with a prototype autopilot that used a wind driven generator and pendulums to drive the wing warping controls. The design was quickly eclipsed by a gyroscopic autopilot developed by Lawrence Sperry for the competing Curtiss Aeroplane Company.

== Operational history ==
On 31 December 1913, Orville Wright demonstrated a Model E with an "automatic stabilizer" flying seven circuits around Huffman Prairie field with his hands above his head. The Model E demonstrations earned the Wright Brothers the 1913 Collier Trophy from Aero Club of America.

Albert Elton (1881–1975) purchased the sole Wright Model E for exhibition flights.

== Specifications (Wright Model E) ==
General characteristics

- Crew: one
- Length: 27 ft 9 in (8.46 m)
- Wingspan: 32 ft (9.8 m)
- Wing area: 316 sq ft (29.4 m^{2})
- Empty weight: 730 lb (331 kg)
- Powerplant: 1 × aircraft engine
- Propellers: 2-bladed fixed pitch, 7 ft (2.1 m) diameter
