= Wright Model B =

American biplane

Model B
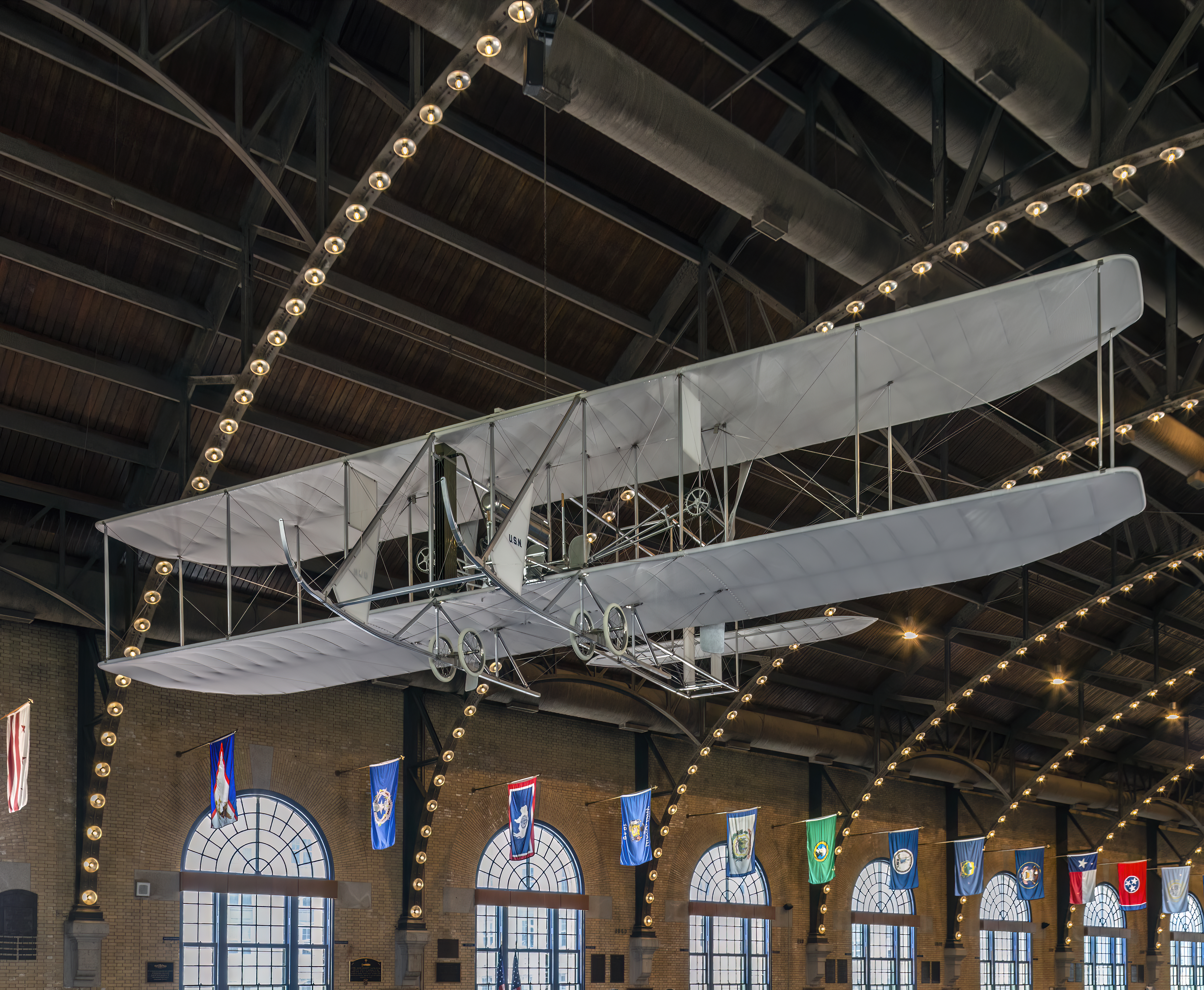
- Replica of Wright Model B in Dahlgren Hall, U.S. Naval Academy, Annapolis

General information
- Type: Sports plane
- Manufacturer: Wright Company
- Primary users: United States Army United States Navy
- Number built: ca. 100

History
- First flight: 1910
- Developed into: Model EX

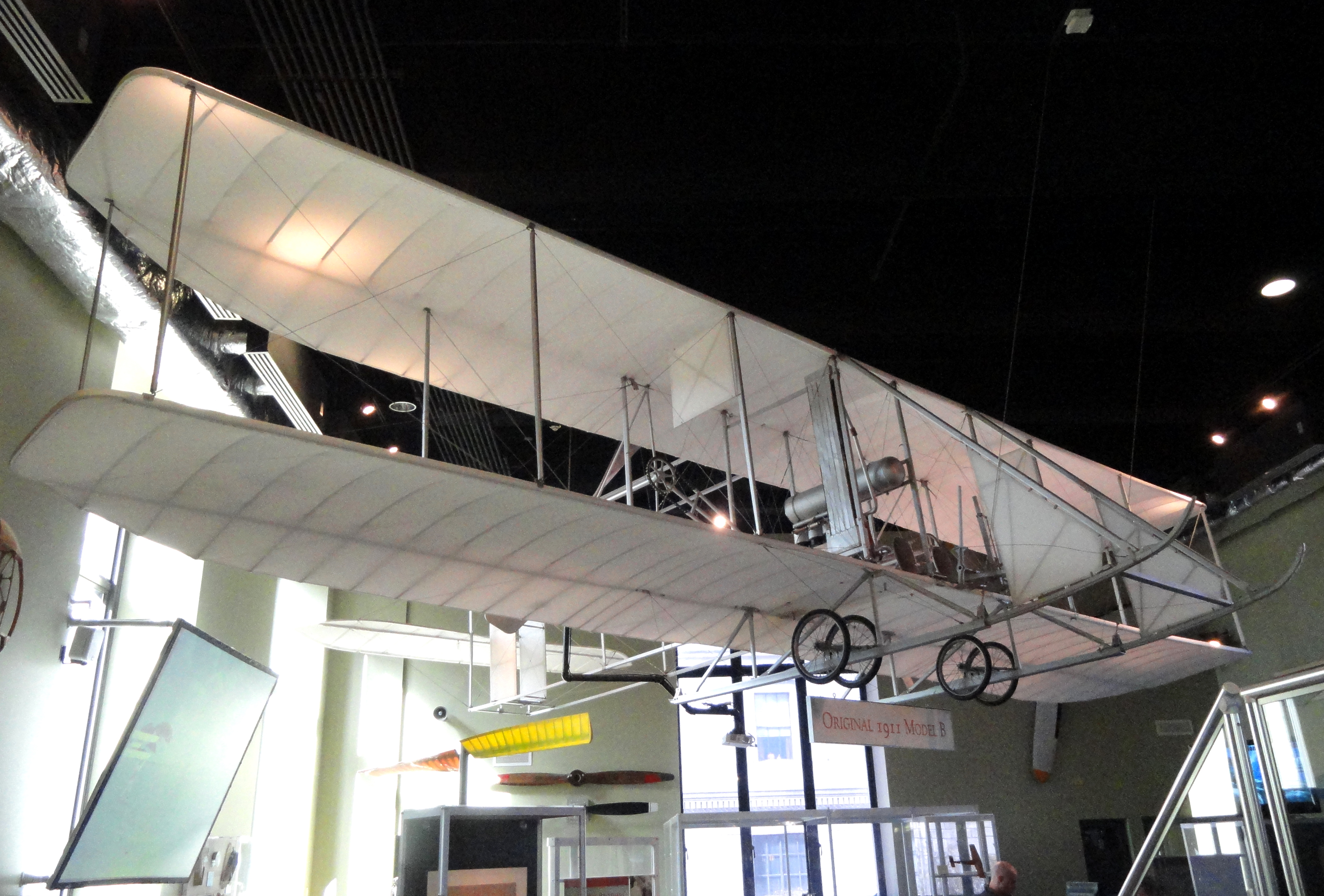
Grover Bergdoll's 1911 Wright Brothers Model B flyer

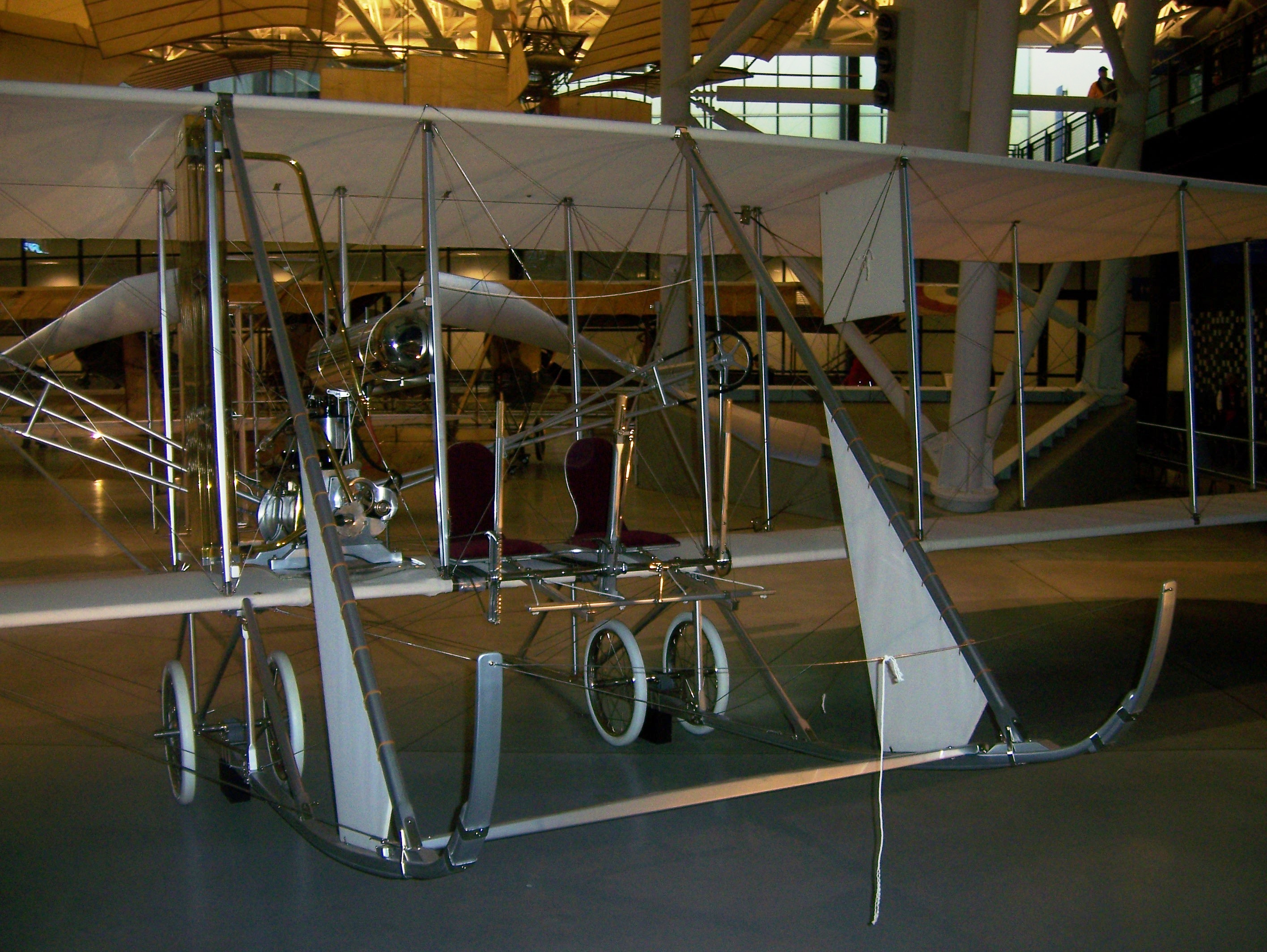
Wright Model B reproduction in Steven F. Udvar-Hazy Center.

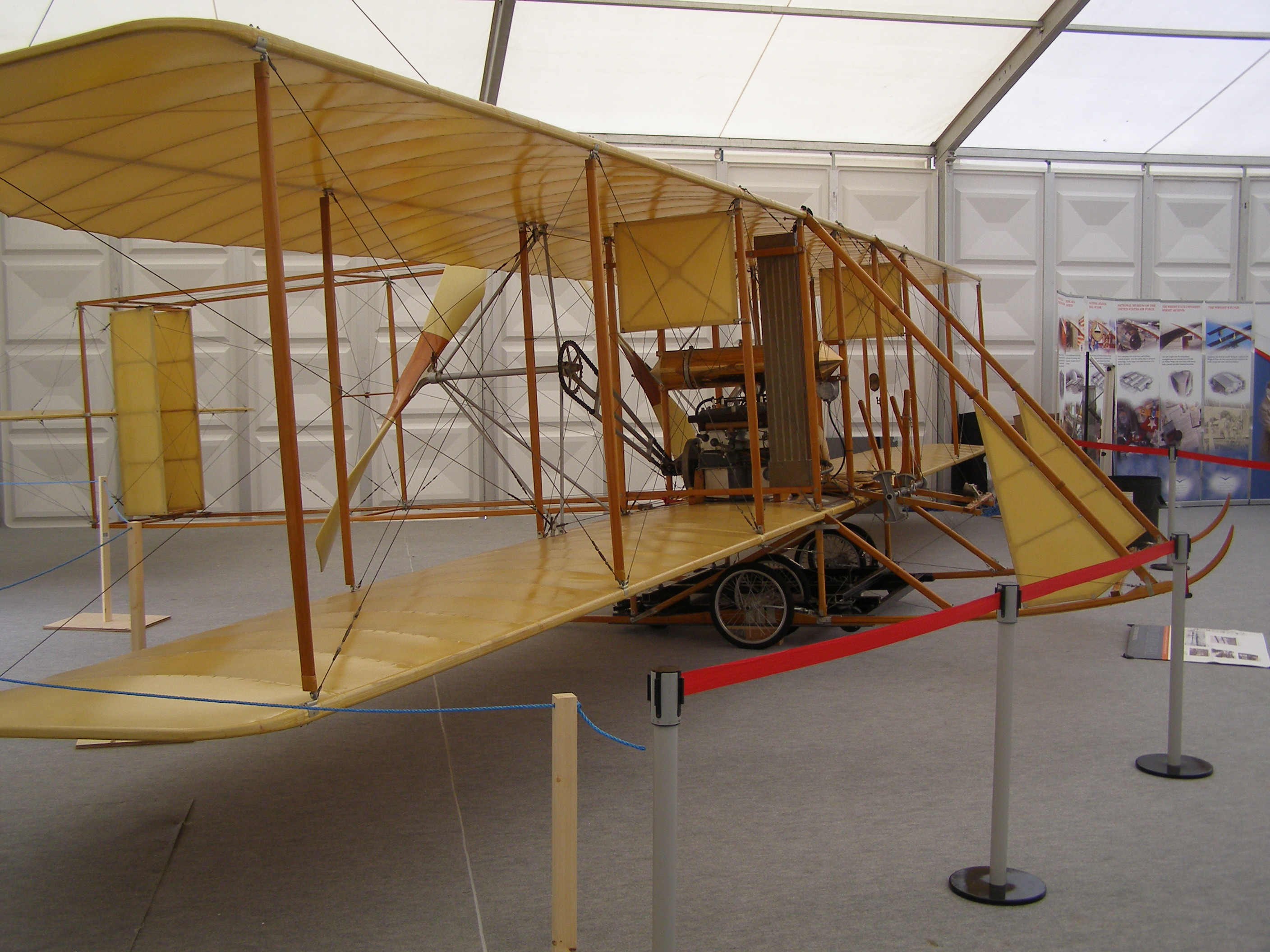
Wright Model B reproduction on display at the Farnborough Airshow 2008

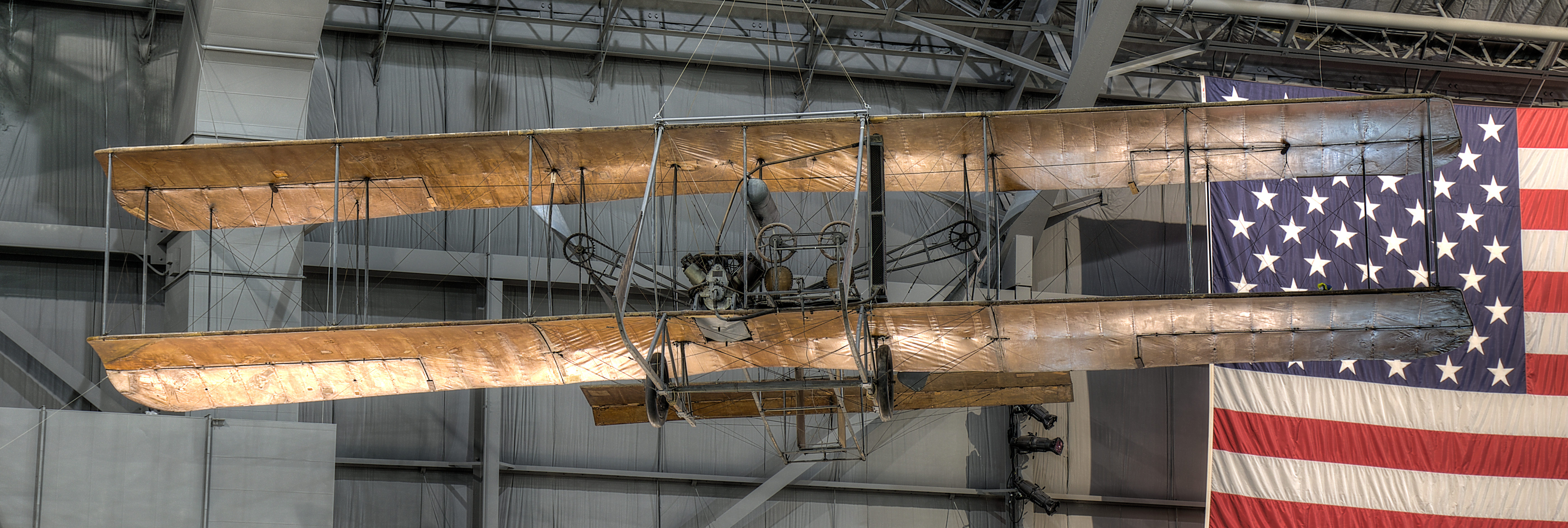
Wright Modified “B” Flyer at the USAF Museum

The Wright Model B is an early pusher biplane designed by the Wright brothers in the United States in 1910. It was the first, and only, of their designs to be built in two-digit quantity. Unlike the Model A, of which 60 were licensed built in Germany, it featured a true elevator carried at the tail rather than at the front. It was the last Wright model to have an open-frame tail. The Model B was a dedicated two-seater with the pilot and a passenger sitting side by side on the leading edge of the lower wing.

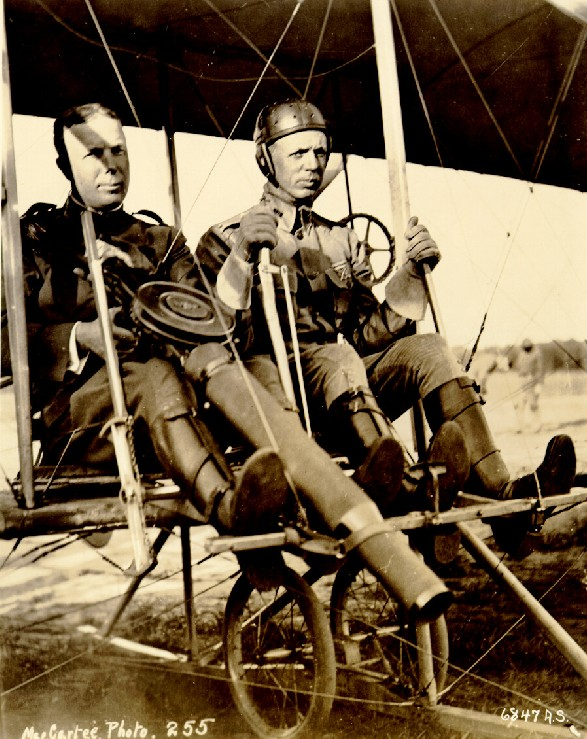
Wright Model B Flyer after the first successful firing of a machine gun from an airplane in June 1912.

Besides their civil market, the Wrights were able to sell aircraft to the Aeronautical Division, U.S. Signal Corps (S.C. 3, 4, and 5) and to the United States Navy as hydroplanes (AH-4, -5-, and -6), in which services they were used as trainers. Furthermore, the Wrights were able to sell licenses to produce the aircraft domestically (to the Burgess Company and Curtis, which designated it Model F; not to be confused with the Wright Model F, an unrelated Wright design), as well as in Germany. The deal with Burgess was the first license-production of aircraft undertaken in the United States and most of the approximately one hundred Model Bs produced were actually built by Burgess.

Development continued as the Model EX. Burgess also planned a refined version as the Model G (not to be confused with the Wright Model G, an unrelated Wright flying boat), but this was never built.

== Variants ==
Model B
Two-seat sports biplane, powered by a 35-hp (26-kW) Wright piston engine.
Model B-1
Civil seaplane variant with two steel and aluminum pontoons.
Model B-2
Civil seaplane variant with a single float.
Burgess-Wright Model F
This version was built under license by the Burgess Company.
Burgess-Wright Model G
Unbuilt version, it was intended to be built by Burgess Company.

== Operators ==
United States

- United States Army
- United States Navy

== Surviving aircraft and replicas ==
At least two original Model Bs were extant in 2007.

- An original Model B is on display at the National Museum of the United States Air Force in Dayton, Ohio. This aircraft was used for flight instruction by Mr. Howard Rinehart at Mineola, New York in 1916. It last flew during the International Air Races at Dayton in October 1924. It was placed on exhibit in the Museum in October 1962 by Eugene W. Kettering, Chairman of the Board of Trustees for the Air Force Museum Foundation.
- An original Model B on display at the Franklin Institute in Philadelphia, Pennsylvania, was purchased by Grover Cleveland Bergdoll in 1912 from Orville Wright.
- A replica of the Burgess-Wright Model F is displayed at Hill Aerospace Museum in Ogden, Utah.
- Wright B Flyers Inc., a non-profit organization based at a museum-hangar at Dayton-Wright Brothers Airport in Dayton, Ohio, owns one replica and one look-alike Wright "B" Flyer. A third look-alike was lost in a crash in 2011.
  - Wright "B" Flyer No. 001 (FAA registration number N3786B) is a flying look-alike nicknamed "Brown Bird". It was built in the late 1970s.
  - Wright "B" Flyer A "Valentine Flyer" (also called the "Yellow Bird") is a non-flying near-replica originally constructed by Tom and Nancy Valentine as a flying model for the TV-movie The Winds of Kitty Hawk in 1978. The aircraft has not flown since being damaged during filming. The "Yellow Bird" is a more accurate replica of the Model B than either 001 or 002.
- Replicas on display:
  - College Park Aviation Museum, College Park, Maryland
  - United States Army Aviation Museum, Fort Novosel, Alabama
  - United States Naval Academy, Annapolis, Maryland
  - Virginia Aviation Museum, Richmond, Virginia
  - EAA Aviation Museum, Oshkosh, Wisconsin
  - Oakland Aviation Museum, Oakland, California

== Specifications ==
General characteristics

- Crew: One pilot
- Capacity: one passenger
- Length: 26 ft 0 in (7.93 m)
- Wingspan: 39 ft 0 in (11.89 m)
- Height: 8 ft 9 in (2.67 m)
- Wing area: 480 sq ft (44.6 m^{2})
- Empty weight: 800 lb (363 kg)
- Gross weight: 1,250 lb (567 kg)
- Powerplant: 1 × Wright Vertical 4 , 35 hp (26 kW)

Performance

- Maximum speed: 45 mph (72 km/h, 39 kn)
- Cruise speed: 40 mph (64 km/h, 35 kn)
- Range: 110 mi (177 km, 96 nmi)

== See also ==
Related development

- Wright 1902 Glider
- Wright Flyer
- Wright Flyer II
- Wright Flyer III
- Wright Model A
