= Wright Company =

Aviation company founded by the Wright Brothers

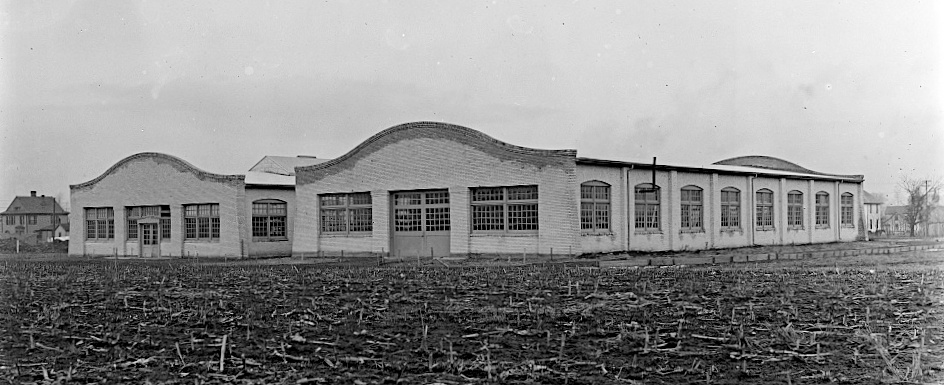
- Wright Company factory, Dayton Ohio, 1911
- Founded: November 22, 1909
- Founders: Orville Wright; Wilbur Wright
- Defunct: 1916
- Fate: Merged with Glenn L. Martin Company in 1916
- Successor: Wright-Martin
- Headquarters: New York, New York, Dayton, Ohio, United States

The Wright Company was the commercial aviation business venture of the Wright brothers, established by them on November 22, 1909, in conjunction with several prominent industrialists from New York and Detroit with the intention of capitalizing on their invention of the practical airplane. The company maintained its headquarters office in New York City and built its factory in Dayton, Ohio.

== History ==
The two buildings designed by Dayton architect William Earl Russ and built by Rouzer Construction for the Wright Company in Dayton in 1910 and 1911 were the first in the United States constructed specifically for an airplane factory and were included within the boundary of Dayton Aviation Heritage National Historical Park in 2009.

The Wright Company concentrated its efforts on protecting the company's patent rights rather than on developing new aircraft or aircraft components, believing that innovations would hurt the company's efforts to obtain royalties from competing manufacturers or patent infringers. Wilbur Wright died in 1912, and on October 15, 1915, Orville Wright sold the company, which in 1916 merged with the Glenn L. Martin Company to form the Wright-Martin Company. Orville Wright, who had purchased 97% of the outstanding company stock in 1914 as he prepared to leave the business world, estimated that the Wright Company built approximately 120 airplanes across all of its different models between 1910 and 1915. This would later merge with Curtiss to form Curtiss-Wright, which is (among other things) a manufacturer of airplane components today.

Many of the papers of the Wright Company are now in the collection of the Museum of Flight in Seattle, while others are held by the Library of Congress in Washington, D.C. The Library of Congress also holds the papers of Grover Loening, the second Wright Company factory manager, while the papers of Frank Henry Russell, the first plant manager, are at the University of Wyoming's American Heritage Center.

=== Factory ===
The original Wright Company factory was turned over to AC Delco and was expanded over the years until it was surrounded by other buildings. After it closed in 2008, plans were made to preserve the original buildings at the center of the campus. A year later, demolition began on the non-historic buildings. In 2014, plans were announced to build a replica Wright Flyer in the buildings.

The factory was added to the National Register of Historic Places in 2019.

A fire in 2023 significantly damaged the plant. One year later, the National Park Service had yet to acquire the property. The top portion of the façade of Building 1 collapsed in July 2025.

== Products ==
=== Aircraft ===
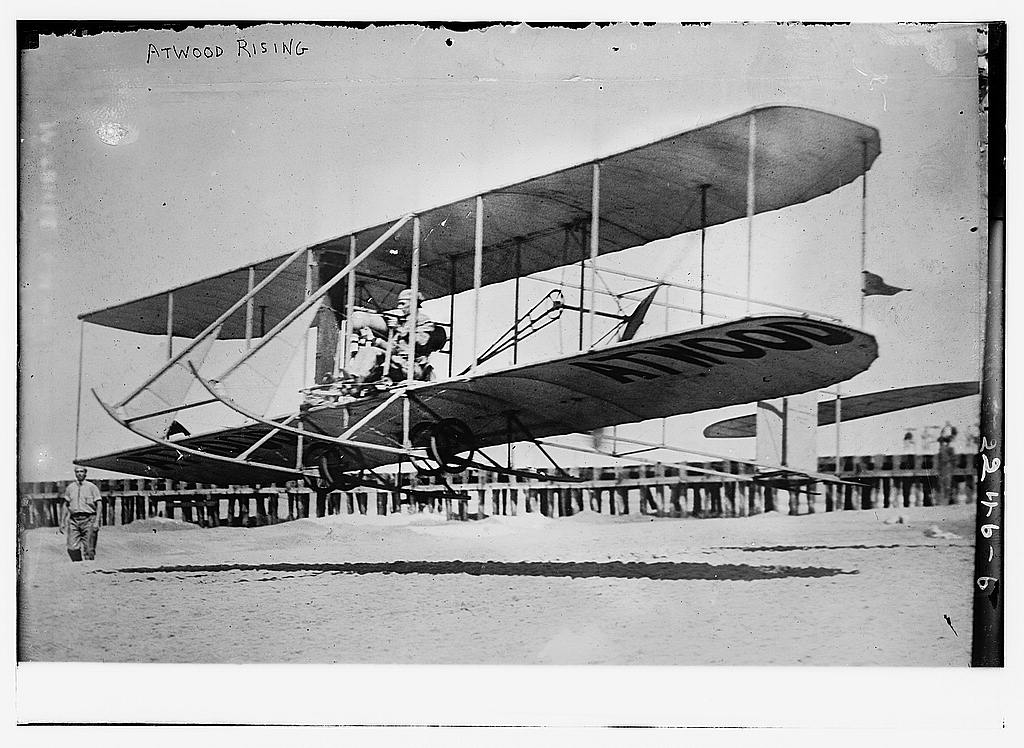
Wright Model B

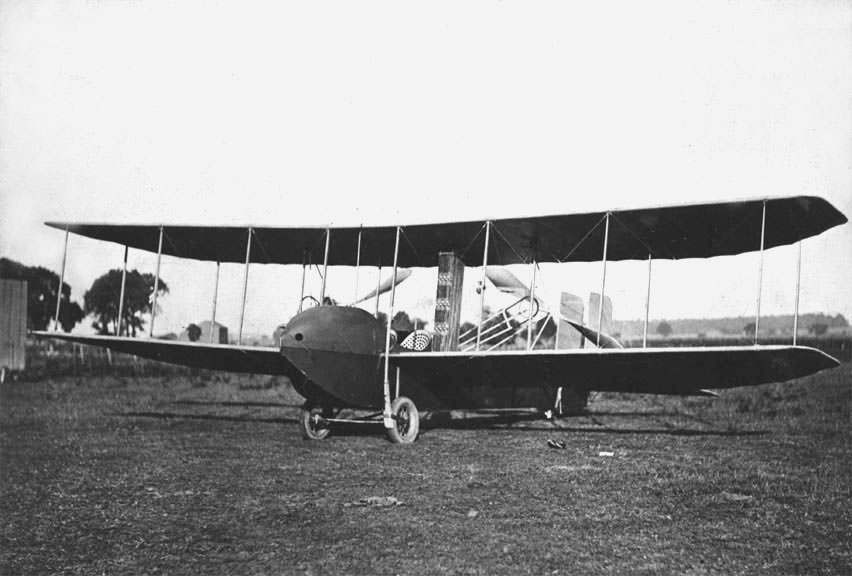
Wright Model H

Model name	First flight	Number built	Type
Wright Model B		Around 100	Single engine biplane sport airplane
Wright Model EX	1911	1	Single engine biplane sport airplane
Wright Model R	1910	1 or 2	Single engine biplane racer
1911 Wright Glider	1911	1	Glider
Wright Model C	1912	7	Single engine biplane scout
Wright Model D		2	Single engine biplane observation airplane
Wright Model CH		3	Single engine biplane floatplane scout
Wright Model G Aeroboat		1+	Single engine biplane floatplane sport airplane
Wright Model E	1913	1	Single engine biplane experimental airplane
Wright Model F			Single engine biplane sport airplane
Wright Model H			Single engine biplane experimental airplane
Wright Model HS			Single engine biplane experimental airplane
Wright Model K		1	Single engine biplane floatplane experimental airplane
Wright Model L			Single engine biplane trainer

=== Engines ===
- Wright Vertical 4
