= Wright Model C =

United States military aircraft

Model C
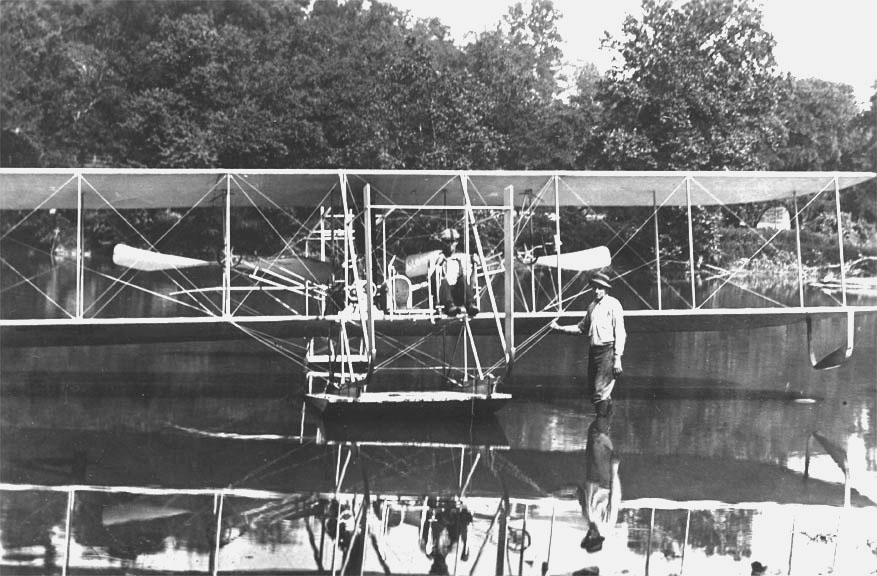
- Wright Model C-H

General information
- Type: Scout
- Manufacturer: Wright Company
- Designer: Orville Wright
- Primary user: Aeronautical Division, U.S. Signal Corps
- Number built: 8

History
- Introduction date: May 18, 1912
- First flight: 1912
- Retired: February 24, 1914

The Wright Model C "Speed Scout" was an early military aircraft produced in the United States and which first flew in 1912. It was a development of the Model B but was specifically designed to offer the Aeronautical Division, U.S. Signal Corps a long-range scouting aircraft.

It featured a more powerful engine over the Wright B, and an endurance of around four hours. Still a two-seater, it added a complete second set of controls, meaning that either crew member could operate the aircraft. On some, the lever controls were replaced with two wheels mounted on a single yoke. Aerodynamically, the small finlets ("blinkers" in the Wrights' terminology) that had been used on the Model B's undercarriage were replaced by two vertical vanes attached to the forward end of the skids.

The aircraft had a short service life, from 1912 to 1914, because of a series of fatal crashes that destroyed six of the eight aircraft manufactured for the Army.

== Development ==
The increase in power was to meet Army specifications that the aircraft have a rate of climb of 200 feet per minute (1 m/s), a fuel capacity for a four-hour flight, and carry a weight of 450 pounds including crew. Its simplified twin-lever control system was confusing to operate and proved difficult for novice pilots to master, while the plane itself was tail heavy and unstable.

Seven Model Cs were used by the Aeronautical Division: S.C. 10-14, S.C. 16, and S.C. 5, a Burgess Model F rebuilt to Wright C standards. Five new Wright Scouts were delivered to the Aviation School at College Park, Maryland; one to the provisional 1st Aero Squadron at Texas City, Texas; and the last shipped to the Philippines. An eighth Aircraft (S.C. 18), a Burgess Model J delivered in January 1913, was a Wright C built under license by the Burgess Company and Curtis.

The aircraft were delivered between May 1912 and January 1913 and were subject to approval of ten flight tests by the Army before acceptance. The first delivered, to have been S.C. 10, crashed during its climbing test on June 11, 1912, killing Wright Company pilot Arthur L. Welsh and Lt. Leighton W. Hazlehurst, and was replaced in October by another Wright C, itself destroyed in the last fatal crash on February 8, 1914. The crash involving Welsh was found by the Army's board of inquiry to have been pilot error by Welsh, who had intentionally placed the aircraft 45 degrees nose down prior to the test to build momentum. Deliveries of the plane continued, although the statement of one eyewitness led to speculation that the elevator had not responded to inputs to pull out of the dive.

== Operational history ==
The Model Cs quickly earned an unenviable reputation when six of the eight passing their acceptance flights crashed between July 8, 1913, and February 9, 1914, with all but one of the crashes involving fatalities. The fifth crash on November 24, 1913, killed the Army's chief instructor and a new pilot. As a result, the Wright Company factory manager, Grover Loening, concluded that the Wright C was flawed by a design defect. Orville Wright disagreed, maintaining that pilot error was to blame, specifically unfamiliarity with the more powerful engine. He theorized that pilots stalled the aircraft by applying full power that in level flight made angle of attack critical. He proposed that full power be used only to climb and invented an angle-of-incidence indicator sensitive enough to warn a pilot that his climb or dive was too steep. He also completed work on an autopilot which he patented in October 1913, and successfully demonstrated in December, but a gyroscope-operated autopilot patented by Lawrence Sperry proved more immediately practical and became standard.

The final crash resulted in grounding of the two surviving Model C's on February 16, 1914. An Army board of investigation concluded that the elevator was "too weak" and that the Model C itself was "dynamically unsuited for flying," despite testimony from Wright's chief instructor that poor maintenance played a key role in the fatalities. The Aeronautical Division hired Loening as an engineer to review the airworthiness of its airplanes, and use of S.C.s No. 16 (which had a less powerful Model B engine) and No. 5 (a Burgess F rebuilt to Model C configuration), permanently discontinued on February 24, 1914, when on Loening's recommendation the Army de-commissioned all seven of its remaining "pusher" airplanes as a matter of policy.

== Variants ==
Model C
Two-seat scouting biplane, powered by a 35-hp (26-kW) Wright piston engine. Six built for the Aeronautical Division, and one converted from a Burgess Model F (a license-built Wright Model B).
Model C-H
Two-seat scouting floatplane, powered by a 60-hp (45-kW) Wright piston engine. Three built for the US Navy.
Model J
One built under license by the Burgess Company and Curtis, with curved wings and 40hp Sturtevant D-4 engine.
Model D Scout
A single-seat experimental variant built for and tested by the Aeronautical Division, two built (S.C. 19 and 20).

== Operators ==
United States

- United States Army
- United States Navy

== Specifications ==
General characteristics

- Crew: Two
- Length: 29 ft 9 in (9.07 m)
- Wingspan: 38 ft 0 in (11.59 m)
- Height: 7 ft 4 in (2.24 m)
- Wing area: 440 sq ft (40.9 m^{2})
- Empty weight: 800 lb (363 kg)
- Gross weight: 1,290 lb (585 kg)
- Powerplant: 1 × Wright 6-cylinder watercooled inline , 75 hp (56 kW)

Performance

- Maximum speed: 60 mph (100 km/h, 52 kn)
- Range: 240 mi (386 km, 210 nmi)
- Endurance: 4 hours
- Rate of climb: 200 ft/min (1.0 m/s)
