= Wright Model F =

Prototype American military aircraft of 1914

Model F
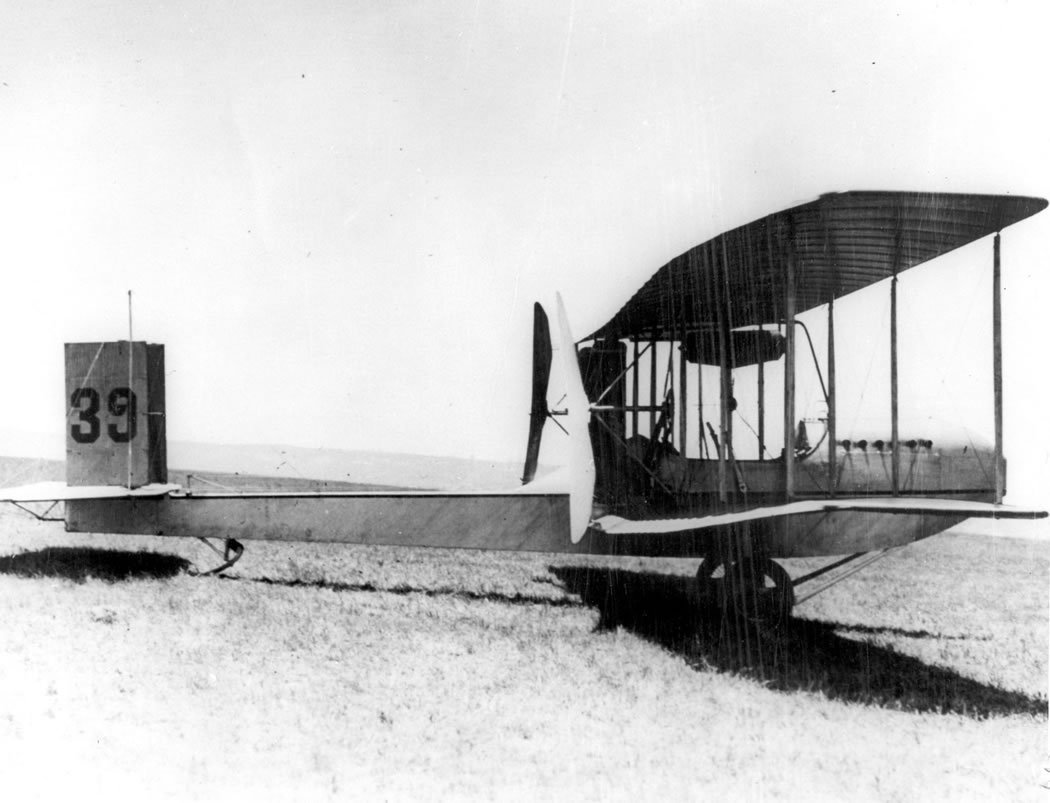

General information
- Type: Military reconnaissance aircraft
- National origin: United States
- Manufacturer: Wright Company
- Designer: Grover Loening
- Number built: 1

History
- First flight: 1914

The Wright Model F was a prototype military aircraft built by the Wright Company for the U.S. Army in 1914. It was the first Wright design to feature a fuselage. The major structural elements of previous Wright designs had been connected by open frameworks. The application of metal armor to the underside of the fuselage, together with its unenviable performance, earned the aircraft the nickname "Tin Cow".

== Design ==
The Model F was a three-bay, unstaggered biplane with equal-span wings. Its overall configuration was conventional, with a conventional tail carried at the rear of the fuselage. The pilot and observer sat side-by-side in an open cockpit. Power was supplied by a piston engine mounted in the nose, which drove two two-bladed pusher propellers mounted on the interplane struts and linked by chain drives. It was fitted with fixed, tailskid undercarriage.

== Development ==
The Model F was designed in response to a 1913 U.S. Army Signal Corps specification for a reconnaissance aircraft. The specification called for the underside of the aircraft to carry a crew of two with a four-hour endurance, be protected by chrome-steel armor, and to be capable of carrying a machine gun. Due to a lack of confidence in American-produced aero engines of the time, the specification also called for use of a foreign powerplant. The contract was worth $9,500.

Wright responded with a design by Grover Loening that resembled the contemporary French designs, with a fuselage, and tail unit that consisted of a fin and horizontal stabilizer. Loenig also adopted the current "Deperdussin-style" controls that combined the aircraft's controls into a central control stick. As originally designed, the aircraft was powered by tractor propellers.

A series of revisions followed, which aviation historian Richard P. Hallion describes as "a dark comedy of errors". At one stage of development, the aircraft was equipped both with "Deperdussin-style" controls, as well as the system of control wheels fitted to previous Wright designs, before the "Deperdussin-style" controls were removed completely. The tractor propellers were moved to become pushers, and the seating arrangement was changed to be side-by-side.

By the time the Model F was finally delivered, it was already a year late, Wright was delivering it at a financial loss, and Loening had quit the company in frustration.

== Operational history ==
The Model F was accepted by the Army in March 1915, and given the serial number "39". During testing it was described as "a lumbersome mass of rattling material" and given its "Tin Cow" nickname. Test pilot Lt. Herbert Dargue said that it was "uncontrollable on the ground and out of date." Only two months later, the aircraft was withdrawn along with all the Army's other pusher designs. It had only flown seven times.

== Operators ==
- United States Army Signal Corps

== Specifications ==
Data from Hallion 2019, p.68

General characteristics

- Crew: 2
- Length: 32 ft 10 in (10.01 m)
- Wingspan: 42 ft 0 in (12.80 m)
- Wing area: 485 sq ft (45.1 m^{2}) (estimated)
- Powerplant: 1 × Beardmore-built Austro-Daimler six-cylinder, water-cooled, inline piston engine, 90 hp (67 kW)

Performance

- Maximum speed: 60 mph (97 km/h, 52 kn) (estimated)

== Notes ==
=== Bibliography ===
- Hallion, Richard P. (2019). The Wright Flyers 1899–1916. Oxford: Osprey.
- The Illustrated Encyclopedia of Aircraft. London: Aerospace Publishing.
- "The New Wright Biplane". Flight. 6 (47). London: Flight: 1133. November 20, 1914.
- Roach, Edward J. (2014). The Wright Company: From Invention to Industry. Athens, OH: Ohio University Press.
- Swanborough, Gordon (1963). United States Military Aircraft Since 1909. London: Putnam.
- Taylor, Michael J. H. (1993). Jane's Encyclopedia of Aviation. London: Studio Editions.
