= Nassau Boulevard Airfield =

- IATA: none; ICAO: none

Summary
- Serves: Garden City, New York
- Built: 1910
- In use: 1910–1913

Runways
Direction	Length		Surface
Direction	ft	m	Surface
			grass

The Nassau Boulevard Airfield, or the Nassau Boulevard Aerodrome, was a short-lived airfield located at Garden City, Long Island, New York, in operation from 1910 to 1913.

== History ==
Due to the restricted space available at nearby Mineola Airport, a new 350-acre flying facility was created in Garden City, New York, in 1910. It was considered one of the finest flying facilities of its era, with 31 wooden hangars, 5 grandstands, workshops, a refreshment stand, and a headquarters. "Nassau Blvd. Airfield was large, stretching from Stratford to the Long Island Rail Road’s Main Line and from Roxbury to Clinch. It had 30 hangars, a 3,000 person grandstand and other facilities. It was surrounded by a 15-foot tall board fence." In September 1911, the Aero Club of America sponsored the Second International Aero Meet at the facility. The first airmail flight in America originated here when pilot Earle L. Ovington flew to Mineola on September 23, 1911, carrying 640 letters and 1,280 postcards.

Following the meet, producer William J. Humphrey filmed the first aviation film, The Military Air-Scout, at the aerodrome, with Army Signal Corps flier Lt. Henry Arnold as the stunt pilot.

By 1913, however, the facility was seen as too small, and the land too valuable, so it was closed and all flying operations moved to the Hempstead Plains Aerodrome.

"Stratford School sits epicenter on what was that airfield."
