= Camp Haan =

WWII-era US Army training camp in Riverside County, California

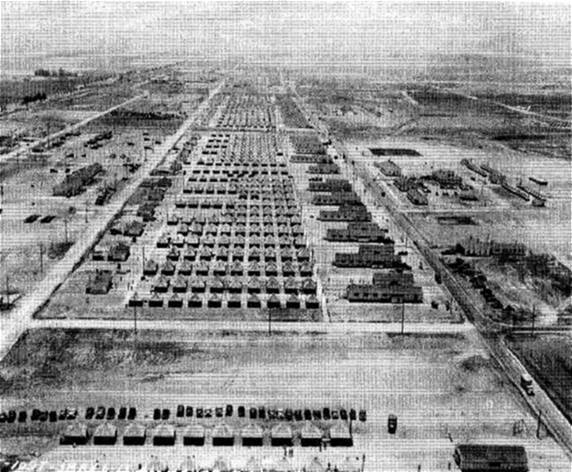
- Camp Haan in 1943

- Location within California
- 33°52′17″N 117°15′58″W
- Location: near Riverside, California

History
- Built: 1940, closed 1945

Site notes
- Architect: US Army

Camp Haan was a US Army training camp built in 1940, near March Air Force Base in Riverside County, California. Camp Haan was opened in January 1941 as a training camp for Coast Artillery Antiaircraft gunners. The 8,058-acre camp was about four miles by three miles with tent housing. The camp was named after Major General William George Haan of World War I. By the end of 1941, the camp had a wood service building, 28 miles of streets, five chapels, and a hospital. The first troops trained were sent for the defense of Los Angeles and San Francisco. The Attack on Pearl Harbor and the Battle of Los Angeles–Bombardment of Ellwood had put all of California on high alert. The Army Service Depot was added to the camp in March 1942. The site of the former Camp Haan is next to California Interstate 215 at the Van Buren Boulevard exit.

Jack Benny performed his radio show live at the camp on April 12, 1942.

The winning of the North African campaign brought a number of Italian Prisoners of War (POW) to California. A POW camp was built in September 1942. It held 1,200 Italian prisoners. The Italian Service Unit of 3rd Italian Quartermaster Service Company worked at the camp. In April 1945, German POWs arrived at the camp. A US Army correctional center was also built at the camp.

As wounded arrived from the Pacific War, an 800-bed Army hospital was built at the camp. Camp Haan at its peak had 80,000 troops, POWs, inmates, and hospital personnel. At the end of the war, the camp was used for temporary housing of troop coming from Operation Magic Carpet.

Camp Haan was closed on August 31, 1946. The land was given back to March Air Base. In 1976, part of the former camp was used for the 921 acre Riverside National Cemetery. The site now houses the Riverside National Cemetery and the General Old Golf Course near Riverside, Riverside County, California. The site of the camp is across I-215 from March Air Reserve Base. The other part of the land became part of Arnold Heights houses. Arnold Heights is named after Army General Henry Harley "Hap" Arnold.

In 2023, a book titled "Camp Haan: Riverside's World War II Anti Aircraft Training Center" was released by Keith A. Beaulieu. The book provides a comprehensive historical perspective of the camp and people. It is available on Amazon.

== See also ==
- California during World War II
- Desert Training Center
