= The Man That Might Have Been =

1914 short film by William J. Humphrey

- Directed by: William J. Humphrey
- Story by: Rupert Hughes
- Production company: Vitagraph Company of America
- Distributed by: General Film Company
- Release date: December 3, 1914 (U.S.)
- Country: United States

The Man That Might Have Been is a 1914 American short drama silent black and white film directed by William J. Humphrey. It is produced by Vitagraph Company of America.

== Cast ==
- William J. Humphrey as William Rudd
- Leah Baird as Mrs. William Rudd
- Leo Delaney as Eric Rudd
- Anders Randolf as Kittredge
