= The Military Air-Scout =

1911 film

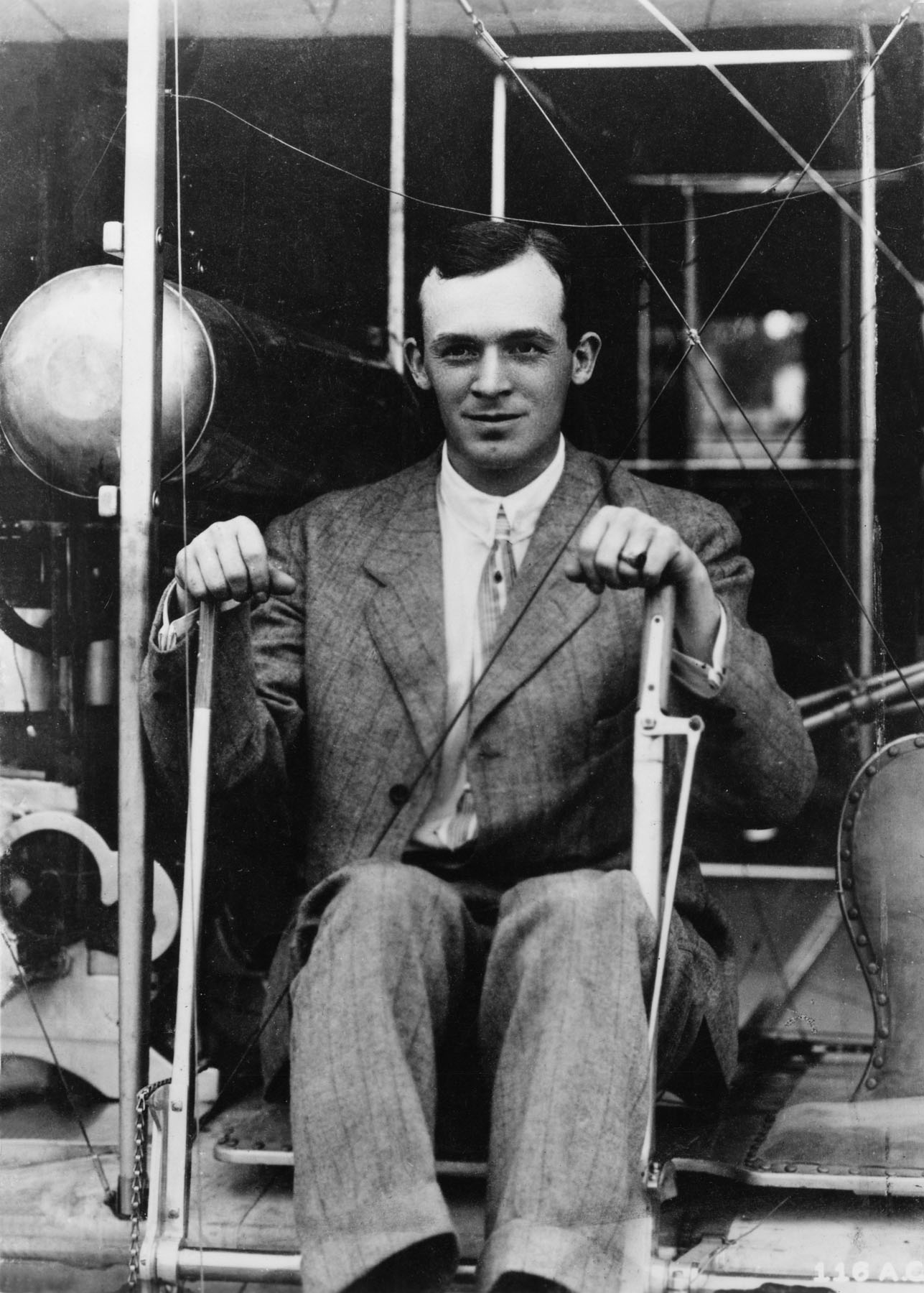
- "Hap" Arnold, stunt pilot
- Directed by: William J. Humphrey
- Starring: Earle Williams; Edith Storey; Alec B. Francis
- Production company: Vitagraph Company of America
- Distributed by: Vitagraph Company of America
- Release date: December 12, 1911
- Running time: Approximately 20 minutes running time
- Country: United States
- Language: English

The Military Air-Scout (1911) is considered by some aviation film historians as one of the first aviation films recorded worldwide. (Note: Stephen Pendo cites 1908 for the release of aviation-related documentary films in the United States. Michael Paris notes that Ferdinand Zecca's À la conquête de l'air [En: The Flying Machine] (1901) was the first film to feature an aircraft.) William J. Humphrey directed the two-reeler in 1911, with the cooperation of the U.S. Army authorities who allowed Lt. Henry Arnold, a pioneer military pilot to carry out stunt flying for the film.

== Plot ==
In 1914, the commanding officer of the U.S. Army (Alec B. Francis), with his daughter, Marie (Edith Storey), and Lieutenant Wentworth (Earle Williams), are watching the flight of the latest military aircraft. Wentworth studies aviation and after becoming a pilot, makes his first flight, witnessed by the general's daughter, his sweetheart.

At an informal luncheon, Commander Arthur learns the United States is at war and has to face European enemies. Lieutenant Wentworth is ordered to attack the enemy's fleet, succeeding in sinking two of the enemy battleships.

The enemy shoots down Wentworth on his next flight. Extracting himself from the wreckage, he is badly injured with a broken arm, but manages to report back to his headquarters. He tells Commander Arthur what has occurred, and after recovery at an army hospital, is reunited with Marie. His brave and daring deeds were well received, and Commander Arthur now accepts him as a prospective son-in-law.

== Cast ==
- Earle Williams as Lieutenant Wentworth
- Edith Storey as Marie Arthur
- Alec B. Francis as Commander Arthur - Marie's Father

== Production ==
The Military Air-Scout was filmed following the Aero Club of America Second International Aero Meet at Long Island, New York in September 1911. Beginning on September 30, 1911, U.S. Army Signal Corps pilot Lt. Henry "Hap" Arnold was seconded to do the stunt flying, doubling for the lead actors. (Note: Arnold had received Fédération Aéronautique Internationale (FAI) pilot certificate No. 29 on July 6, 1911, and Military Aviator Certificate No. 2 a year later.) Arnold had brought his Army Wright Model F/Wright Burgess Hydro biplane from College Park Airport, Maryland, by train.

Flight operations were conducted from the Nassau Boulevard aerodrome, Garden City, Long Island, New York, and were completed in October 1911. Arnold, who picked up "a few extra bucks" for his services, became so excited about films that he almost quit the Army to become an actor." He would later fly again in The Elopement (1912), also filmed in October 1911. (Note: Arnold's most widely-used nickname, "Hap," short for "Happy," was attributed variously to work associates when he moonlighted as a stunt pilot (or to his wife).)
