= Arnold Heights, California =

Unincorporated community in California, United States

Arnold Heights
- Unincorporated community
- Location in California Arnold Heights (the United States)
- Coordinates: 33°53′37″N 117°16′44″W
- Country: United States
- State: California
- County: Riverside County
- Elevation: 1,558 ft (475 m)

Arnold Heights was an unincorporated community in Riverside County, California. The location is at elevation of 1558 feet (475 m) and 8 miles (12.9 km) southeast of Riverside.

The community began in 1945 on land that used to be Camp Haan, that was developed into residences for personnel assigned to the March Air Force Base. It was named after Army General Henry Harley "Hap" Arnold. The community was actually constructed in 1953.

The typical home in Arnold Heights was about 1,000 square feet with a small carport. Front lawns were watered, back yards were desert.

There were approximately 588 single-story homes in the community, which was vacated in 1998 after March AFB was downsized to an Air Force Reserve Facility. In January 2004-August 2005, 35,000 Marines were trained in the vacated community, and called "Camp Matilda". After being demolished, the land was slated for incorporation into Meridian Business Center.
