= Hearts of the First Empire =

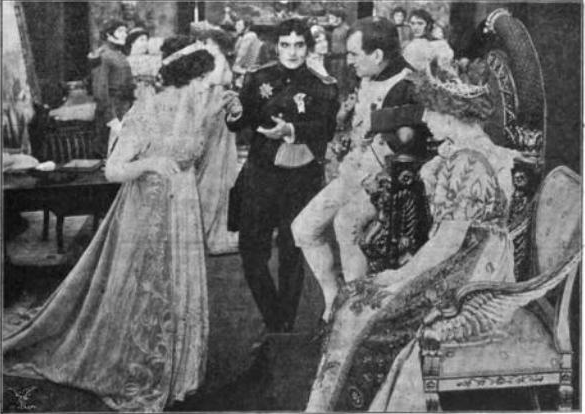
- Directed by: William Humphrey
- Starring: William Humphrey; Edith Storey; Leah Baird; Earle Williams
- Distributed by: Vitagraph
- Release date: April 28, 1913
- Running time: 2 reels/2,030 ft
- Country: United States
- Languages: Silent; English intertitles

Hearts of the First Empire is an American two-reel silent film set during the Peninsular War of the First French Empire. It is thought to be lost.

== Release ==
Hearts of the First Empire was released in the United States on April 28, 1913, in Toronto in early May, 1913, and was released in England on August 11, 1913. The film played in New Zealand in March, 1914, where it was screened alongside the contemporary drama Cinders, also made by Vitagraph. An Italian censorship document for the film was filed April 14, 1914.
