= Cinders (1913 film) =

1913 film by Rollin S. Sturgeon

- Directed by: Rollin S. Sturgeon
- Written by: W. Hanson Durham
- Starring: George C. Stanley; Gertrude Short; Anne Schaefer; Major J.A. McGuire
- Distributed by: Vitagraph
- Release date: May 2, 1913
- Running time: 11 min
- Country: United States
- Languages: Silent; English intertitles

Cinders is an American silent drama film.

== Production ==
The dog in the film was played by 'Mutt,' cast member George Stanley's own dog.

== Release ==
Cinders was released on May 2, 1913, in the United States, and on August 14, 1913, in England. It accompanied the two-reel prestige drama, Hearts of the First Empire at screenings in New Zealand in March, 1914.
