= William J. Humphrey =

American actor (1863–1942)

William Humphrey
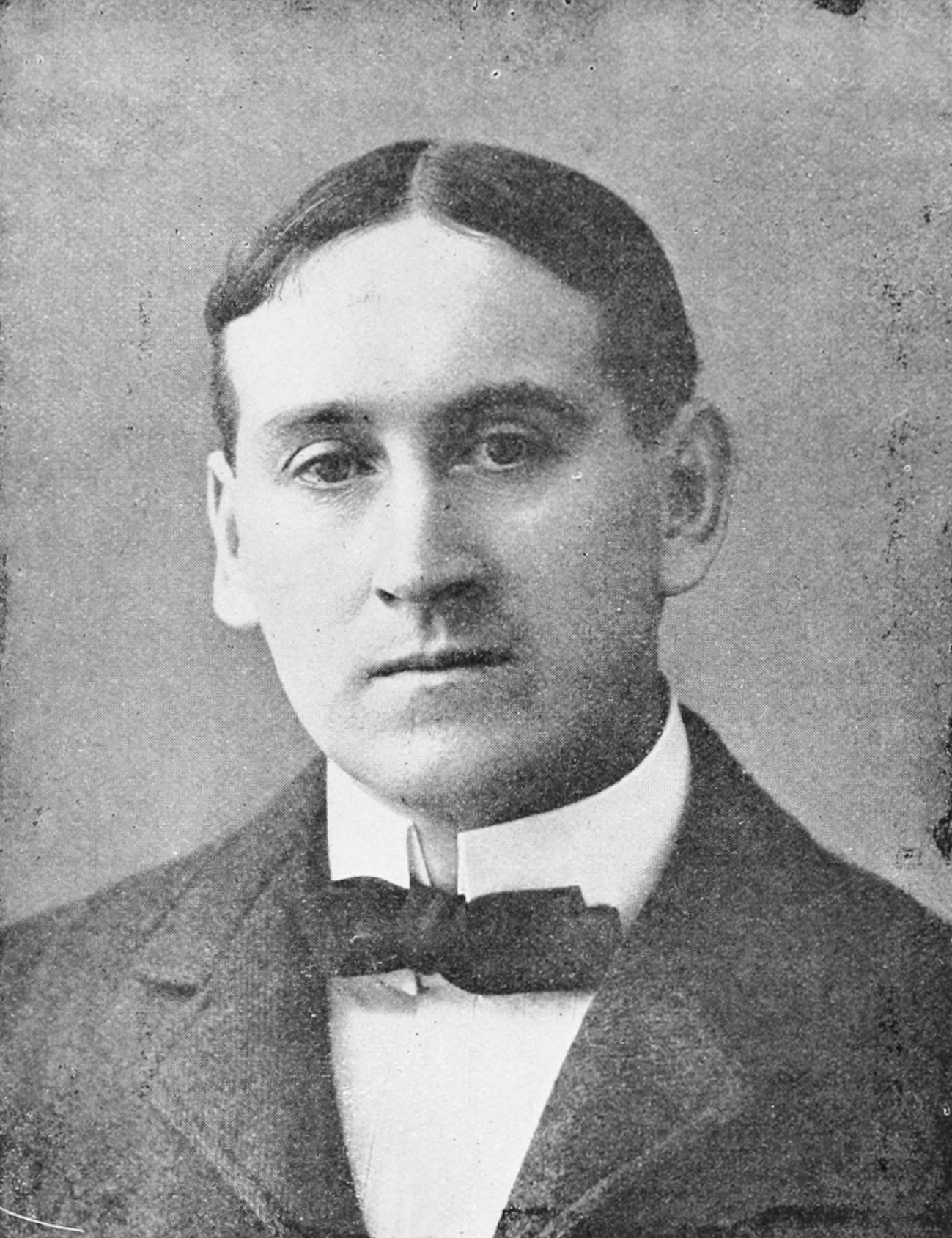
- Humphrey c. 1903
- Born: William Jonathan Humphrey; January 2, 1863; Chicopee Falls, Massachusetts
- Died: October 4, 1942 (aged 79)
- Occupations: Actor and film director

William Jonathan Humphrey (January 2, 1863 – October 4, 1942) was an American actor and film director.

Born on January 2, 1863, in Chicopee Falls, Massachusetts, William Humphrey was a well-known member of the early stock company of Vitagraph Studios. Without the romantic looks to become a real star, he nevertheless played leads in Shakespeare and other important studio productions of the day. He also directed or co-directed eighty films between 1911 and 1927, including comedian Mabel Normand in the 1918 propaganda drama entitled Joan of Plattsburg.

In the late silent era, Humphrey, with other original Vitagraph actors such as Florence Turner, Maurice Costello, and Flora Finch, was kept on the Metro-Goldwyn-Mayer payroll for expert playing of character roles. For MGM, he had roles in One Night in Rome (1924) starring Laurette Taylor and The Actress (1928) starring Norma Shearer. He acted in 138 films altogether and continued until 1937.

On October 4, 1942, Humphrey died of a coronary thrombosis in Hollywood, California.

== Selected filmography ==
- Twelfth Night (1910)*short
- The Military Air-Scout (1911)*short
- Hearts of the First Empire (1913)*short
- The Man That Might Have Been (1914) as William Rudd
- The Unchastened Woman (1918)
- The Way of a Woman (1919)
- Atonement (1919)
- The Black Spider (1920)
- The Strangers' Banquet (1922)
- The Social Code (1923)
- The Dramatic Life of Abraham Lincoln (1924) as Stephen A. Douglas
- Arizona Express (1924)
- Beau Brummel (1924)
- The Unholy Three (1925)
- Drusilla with a Million (1925)
- Life's Crossroads (1928)
- Devil-May-Care (1929)
- Murder at Midnight (1931)
- Find the Witness (1937)
