= George Holmes =

George Holmes may refer to:

== Academics ==
- George Holmes (archivist) (1662–1749), English archivist; deputy Keeper of Records in the Tower of London
- George Frederick Holmes (1820–1897), American university professor and administrator
- George Holmes (historian) (1927–2009), Welsh professor of medieval history at the University of Oxford
- George Holmes (vice-chancellor) (born 1961), British academic administrator; vice-chancellor of the University of Bolton

== Arts and entertainment ==
- George Holmes (musician) (c.1680–1720), English organist
- George Augustus Holmes (1826–1911), English painter
- George Holmes (actor) (1918–1985), American film and television actor

== Others ==
- George Bax Holmes (1803–1887), English fossil collector
- George Holmes (bishop) (1858–1912), English-born Canadian Bishop of Athabasca
- George Holmes (footballer) (1892–?), English soccer player
- George H. Holmes (1898–1965), American airman; last enlisted pilot in the USAF
- George Holmes (civil servant) (1926–2025), British forester and public official
- George M. Holmes (1929–2009), American politician in the North Carolina General Assembly
- George Holmes (rugby union) (1893–1928), Irish rugby union player
