= Auxiliary Pilot Badge =

United States Air Force qualification badge

The Glider Pilot, Liaison Pilot, and Service Pilot badges were qualification badges of the United States Army Air Forces issued during the years of World War II to identify a rating in one of three specialized, limited-duty pilot categories whose selection and training differed from that of the traditional military pilot.

The badges denoting these respective ratings were similar to the standard USAAF Pilot Badge with one of three upper-case letters superimposed upon the badge's shield (formally termed escutcheon) denoting the wearer's rating: G (Glider Pilot), L (Liaison Pilot), or S (Service Pilot).

The individual awarded these ratings were selected on the basis of civil flying experience and pilot certificates gained prior to their induction into the U.S. Army. Further training tended to be focused within a narrowly defined set of missions for which their previously acquired skills and experience were considered directly applicable. In addition, less-restrictive medical standards and broader age limits applied at initial entry.

== US Army Air Forces Flying Medical Classes Compared ==
In contrast to the Aviation Cadet Training Program, medical standards for initial entry into the Glider Pilot, Liaison Pilot or Service Pilot ratings were less restrictive. As opposed to the USAAF Class I medical examination required of all prospective Aviation Cadets, prospective Glider and Liaison Pilots meeting only USAAF Class II standards were allowed into those respective training programs, while the still less restrictive Class III standards were permitted for entrants into the Service Pilot rating.

The most significant difference in standards between each medical class was visual acuity (all values for each eye separately):

- Class I. Distant and near: 20/20 or better uncorrected. Applied to applicants for the Aviation Cadet Training Program only (effective 1942, the Class II medical below was allowed for Aviation Cadets classified for Navigator and Bombardier training only).
- Class II. Distant and near: 20/40 (later 20/100) uncorrected, correctable with spectacles to 20/20 or better. Applied to rated Pilots with less than 1500 hours flying time, Navigators, Bombardiers, Liaison Pilots and Glider Pilots.
- Class III. Distant: 20/100 (later 20/200) uncorrected, correctable with spectacles to 20/20 or better. Near: correctable to 20/20 or better. Applied to Senior Pilots, Command Pilots, Service Pilots and Senior Service Pilots, Flight Surgeons, Technical Observers, and most Aircrew Member ratings.

N.B.: For Class II and III personnel, correction to 20/20 or better in each eye separately with ordinary spectacles was required in all cases, and no other visual or ocular deficiencies were allowed. Changes to the more permissive minimum uncorrected acuity requirements (listed in parentheses) were made in June 1942.

N.B.: USAAF medical examination Classes I, II and III differed significantly in purpose and scope from those in use within military and civil aviation today, and do not directly correspond to any current USAF, US Army or FAA standard titled under the same or similar terminology. This information is for historical reference only.

== Age Limits ==
Age restrictions were also more lenient in the case of applicants for these ratings. For comparison (all limits inclusive):

- Aviation Cadet: 18 to 26 years
- Glider Pilot: 18 to 35 years
- Liaison Pilot: 18 to 35 years
- Service Pilot: 18 to 45 years

== Glider Pilot ==
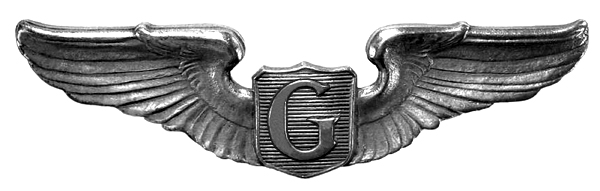

Glider Pilot wings were awarded to soldiers who completed training as pilots of military gliders (MOS 1026). The wings were issued initially during the Second World War. The final class of Glider Pilots ever to be trained received their wings in January 1945 at South Plains Army Airfield, near Lubbock, Texas. These wings should not be confused with the Glider Badge which was created in 1944 to recognize glider-borne ground troops (mostly Infantry, but also various supporting arms) of U.S. Airborne Divisions, who rode into combat as passengers.

The success of German glider-borne forces early in World War II catapulted the Army Air Forces into a glider program in February 1941. In December 1941, plans called for training 1,000 AAF glider pilots, but eventually about 5,500 received their wings. Most Glider Pilots came from the enlisted ranks — all were volunteers. Junior enlisted personnel trained in the pay grade of Sergeant during training, while NCOs and above trained in-grade. Upon graduation, Sergeants and below would be promoted to Staff Sergeant, whereas those already in the grade of Staff Sergeant or higher retained their current grade. After Nov. 21, 1942, all enlisted graduates were appointed as Flight Officers — equal to the then existing rank of Warrant Officer Junior Grade (WO 1) — upon completing Advanced Glider Training.

Initially, applicants for Glider Pilot training had to meet the following requirements:

- Age 18 to 35 years
- Pass AAF Class I or II flying medical examination
- Score at least 110 on the Army AGCT Test, or at least 65 on the Aviation Cadet Mental Screening Test
- Have prior flying experience meeting one or more of the following criteria:
  - Hold a currently effective civilian airman certificate in the grade of private pilot or higher, or
  - Held a lapsed airman certificate, provided that such certificate did not lapse prior to 1 January 1941, or
  - Completed 200 or more previous glider flights, or
  - Previously eliminated from military or naval pilot training, provided at least 50 hours had been logged as principal pilot (solo or performing duties of first-pilot under supervision)and/or as student pilot on military or naval aircraft.

Effective 12 June 1942, individuals with no previous flying experience were also accepted into glider training. Individuals meeting the experience criteria listed above were classified as Class A Students, and all others as Class B Students. Several critical changes were introduced into the training program during 1942-43 (as described in the next two paragraphs), however ground training included practical instruction in basic infantry skills in addition to the normal aviation ground school subjects throughout.

=== Glider Pilot Training ===
April 1941 to June 1942

The USAAF's Glider Pilot Training Program was in its embryonic stage. Several experimental courses were conducted during this period, using two-place sailplanes acquired commercially. Extensive use was made of civilian instructors, and of facilities and aircraft at civilian soaring clubs and flight schools. The sailplanes used were optimized for long-duration, unpowered soaring flight however, and did not adequately simulate the flight characteristics of the cargo gliders under development. This resulted in several significant changes to the training program effective 15 June 1942.

15 June 1942 to 13 September 1942

Glider Pilot Training was divided into two principal stages: Preliminary and a combined Elementary-Advanced stage. For Class A students, Preliminary lasted four weeks and included 30 hours of dual and solo training on liaison (L-series) aircraft (e.g.: Piper Cub, various Taylorcraft and Stinson types), with particular emphasis on steep gliding descents, approaches and precision landings without power ("dead-stick" landings).

Class B students underwent a somewhat longer Preliminary phase, itself divided into two further phases: Phase I, of five weeks' duration and consisting of 40 hours dual and solo flying on primary trainer (PT-series) or liaison (L-series) aircraft, emphasizing basic aircraft handling, and Phase II, a further two weeks and 15 hours of flight time emphasizing "dead-stick" landings.

Training for Class A and Class B students merged at the beginning of the Elementary-Advanced stage, consisting of one week and eight flight hours on two- or three-place training gliders — typically Aeronca TG-5 and similar aircraft — followed by another week and a further eight hours on Waco CG-4 cargo gliders. Total training time was typically 46 flight hours (six weeks) for Class A students and 71 flight hours (nine weeks) for Class B students.

14 September 1942 to 26 February 1943

The Glider Pilot training syllabus followed a progression of Preliminary, Elementary, Basic and Advanced phases, with Class A and Class B students training together under a common syllabus from the commencement of the Elementary phase. Preliminary was attended only by the Class B students, was four weeks in duration and included 30 hours dual and solo flying much the same as earlier classes. Elementary was also four weeks long, with a further 30 hours on the same trainers as flown in the Preliminary phase, but with emphasis on "dead-stick" landings. A Basic phase was introduced after Elementary, lasted another four weeks and included 30 hours on TG-5, TG-6 and/or TG-8 training gliders. The Advanced phase until 21 December 1942 was a four-week period of training, with a further 15 flying hours on training gliders mastering low-approach and "blitz" landings (as used in combat). Beginning 21 December 1942, this phase was reduced to two weeks in length and consisted of eight flying hours on CG-4 cargo gliders.

=== Glider Pilot Duties ===
Glider Pilots deployed under USAAF's Troop Carrier Command, and were tasked to deliver personnel and cargo deep into enemy-held territory aboard cargo gliders designed especially for that purpose. Gliders such as the U.S.-built Waco CG-4 or the British-designed Airspeed Horsa AS.51/58 were towed to their destinations by multi-engine cargo transports — most commonly the C-47 — then released directly overhead of their landing zones. Glider Pilots would execute a steep, rapid descent from the moment of tow release, arresting their descent rate and airspeed only in the final seconds prior to touchdown. Ingress on-tow into enemy airspace was typically executed at less than 1000 feet above ground level (AGL), often at night and/or in marginal weather, and frequently under severe enemy small-arms and anti-aircraft artillery fire. Wake turbulence generated by the tow-planes' wingtips and propellers coupled with low-level atmospheric turbulence typically resulted in an extremely rough ride, and many of the glider-borne troops suffered airsickness.

Commissioned officers holding the Glider Pilot rating were eligible to command flying units equipped with gliders only. Effective 4 February 1943, rated Glider Pilots were authorized to pilot liaison aircraft of 180 horsepower or less and to perform the same duties as Liaison Pilots.

=== Notable former Glider Pilots ===
- John L. "Jackie" Coogan, actor. Assistant Operations Officer for Glider Ground Operations, 1st Air Commando Group

== Liaison Pilot ==
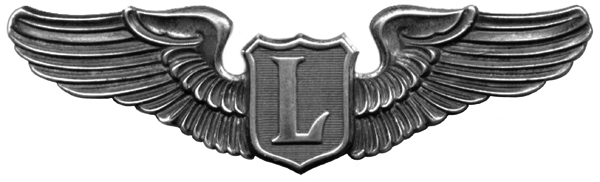

The Liaison Pilot Badge was presented to enlisted military pilots of MOS 772 (officers holding the Liaison Pilot rating held the MOS Code 1981 - Air Observation Pilot): "Pilots and maintains a small liaison airplane of 175 horsepower or less for purposes of ferrying officers, taking observers on observation missions, or transporting small amounts of critical materiel. Inspects and performs minor maintenance on airplane to which assigned.", and usually assigned to Liaison Squadrons of the USAAF and to Aviation Sections of Army Ground Forces units at the Division level and above (e.g.: a Divisional Artillery HQ would include a small Aviation Section). A minority of Liaison Pilots held commissioned rank; these were normally Field Artillery officers from Army Ground Forces, fully trained as artillery forward observers. Commissioned and flight officer Liaison Pilots performed substantially the same flying duties as their enlisted counterparts, and were eligible to command flying units equipped with L-series (liaison) aircraft only.

=== Liaison Pilot Training ===
Applicants for Liaison Pilot duty were drawn from the following sources:

- Washouts from the Basic and Advanced phases of pilot training under the Aviation Cadet Training Program (USAAF) or Aviation Cadet Training Program (USN). In similar manner to the Glider Pilots, applicants in this category were required to have passed Primary phase and have logged at least 50 hours of student pilot time (dual, solo or a combination thereof) on military or naval aircraft. Individuals who had finished Primary but washed out from a later phase were often given the option to transition to the Liaison Pilot or Glider Pilot rating, depending upon needs of the service, hence both were often considered "second chance" ratings.
- The Field Artillery School, Fort Sill, Oklahoma. These were typically Field Artillery officers (and occasionally enlisted personnel) who had already been trained as forward observers. Those not possessing a private (or higher) pilot rating acquired in civil life or 50 hours of previous military or civilian pilot experience were given an elementary course of some 40 to 60 hours on L- or PT-series aircraft (similar to that given Class B students in the Glider Pilot program) before progressing to mission-specific Liaison Pilot training.
- Graduates of the Civilian Pilot Training Program. This course was considered to be equivalent in depth and scope to Elementary or Primary Flying Training under the USAAF and US Navy programs.
- Direct assignment of USAAF personnel currently rated as Pilots (including Service Pilots). This appears to have been a less commonplace source, and anecdotal indications from the relevant literature suggest they had usually volunteered for this duty.
- Civilian pilot volunteers. A private pilot certificate (or higher) and a minimum or 40 hours of flight time were required. Individuals falling short of the experience requirements demanded for the Service Pilot rating were often accepted as Liaison Pilots instead.

Liaison Pilot School was conducted by the Department of Air Training of the Field Artillery School at Ft. Sill, Oklahoma. The course placed particular emphasis on short-field and soft-/rough-field takeoffs and landings over obstacles, and low-altitude navigation. Their duties included transportation of troops and supplies, medical evacuation, aerial photography, and low-level reconnaissance. Graduates received Liaison Pilot wings. Personnel trained in-grade, with enlisted students being promoted to Staff Sergeant until September 1942, after which graduates were appointed as Flight Officers.

=== Liaison Pilot Duties ===
Liaison pilots flew light single-engine aircraft in direct support of Army Ground Forces units. Commissioned officers holding the Liaison Pilot Rating were eligible to command flying units equipped with liaison (L-series) aircraft only.

Liaison units flew "...light single-engine liaison aircraft. Included were many enlisted aviation students who washed out of pilot training after having soloed and were given the opportunity to become Liaison Pilots. Flight training consisted of about 60 hours of flying time and stressed such procedures as short field landings and takeoffs over obstacles, low altitude navigation, first aid, day and night reconnaissance, aerial photography and aircraft maintenance. Unarmored and unarmed—except perhaps for a .45 pistol or .30 carbine—these men in 28 different squadrons flew low and slow with wheels, skis or floats. They flew varied and often hazardous missions in nearly every theater—medical evacuation from forward areas; delivering munitions, blood plasma, mail and other supplies to front lines; ferrying personnel; flying photographic or intelligence missions; serving as air observers for fighters or bombers; and other critical yet often unpublicized missions.

"During the campaign to recapture the Philippines, pilots of the 25th Liaison Squadron flew a dozen L-5 aircraft in short 30-minute flights (Dec. 10-25, 1944) delivering supplies (including a 300-bed hospital) to the 6,000 men of the 11th Airborne Division isolated in the mountains of Leyte.

"In another mission, an army officer wounded in the chest in New Guinea was evacuated in a liaison aircraft as the pilot pumped a portable respirator with one hand while he flew the aircraft with the other.

"In the northwestern United States, some liaison pilots flew forest patrols (Project Firefly), watching for fires ignited by incendiary bombs carried across the Pacific beneath unmanned Japanese high-altitude balloons."

Effective 4 February 1943, rated Glider Pilots were authorized to pilot liaison aircraft of 180 horsepower or less and to perform the same duties as Liaison Pilots.

=== Notable former Liaison Pilots ===
- Charles "Bazooka Charlie" Carpenter, history teacher, destroyed six German tanks from a Piper L-4
- Mayhew Foster, transported Hermann Göring from Germany to Austria for interrogation.
- Rush H. Limbaugh, Jr., father of broadcasting personality Rush H. Limbaugh III, commanded 25th Liaison Squadron
- Welton I. Taylor (Ph.D.), African-American microbiologist, author of Two Steps to Glory (2012, Winning Strategy Press, ISBN 978-0983867715)
- John Thornton Walker, personal pilot for Gen. Mark W. Clark

== Service Pilot ==
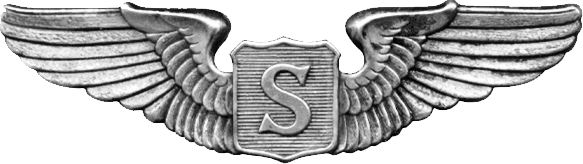

Service pilots performed non-combat flying duties, including instruction, outside the theaters of operation.

An image of the Service Pilot badge remains shown (at right) pending completion of new articles for all three ratings.

== Postwar (1945-1947) ==
Following the close of World War II, these pilot badges fell into disuse and there were no further issuances. With the creation of the U.S. Air Force, these three aeronautical ratings became obsolete.

=== Glider Pilot Legacy ===
The United States Air Force Academy Cadet Soaring Instructor Pilots wear the Glider Pilot wings in honor of the WWII Glider Pilots, by permission of the National WW2 Glider Pilots' Association and the Superintendent of the U.S. Air Force Academy.

The following NASA astronauts have been inducted by the National WW2 Glider Pilots' Association as Honorary Members:

- Deke Slayton (former WW2-era USAAF B-25 and A-26 pilot, ASTP Docking Module Pilot, former Chief Astronaut)
- Fred W. Haise (Apollo 13 Lunar Module Pilot, Shuttle Approach and Landing Tests)
- Joseph H. Engle (X-15 test pilot, Shuttle Approach and Landing Tests)
- C. Gordon Fullerton (Shuttle Approach and Landing Tests)
- Richard H. Truly (Shuttle Approach and Landing Tests)
- John W. Young (STS-1 Commander)
- Robert L. Crippen (STS-1 Pilot)

WW2-era Glider Pilots invited to fly the Space Shuttle Orbiter simulator at NASA's Johnson Space Center have reportedly completed every simulated landing accurately and correctly on the first attempt.

The Civil Air Patrol awards a Glider Pilot Badge of its own — having a somewhat differing wing and escutcheon design while retaining the letter G — to its members who hold an FAA pilot certificate (private or higher) with a glider category rating and have passed a CAP/USAF mandated written and flight examination on gliders.

=== Liaison Pilot Legacy ===
Following the USAAF's separation in 1947 to become the U.S. Air Force, the Liaison Pilots embedded with the U.S. Army's Field Artillery battalions remained part of the Army, forming the nucleus of what would evolve into today's U.S. Army Aviation Branch. What was once the Liaison Pilot rating has long since evolved, further expanding into the Army Aviator qualification of today's Army. The modern Airborne Forward Air Controller (FAC) role has its roots in the role of the Liaison Pilots of the WW2 era, and continues to be employed on modern airframes in the U.S. Army, U.S. Air Force and U.S. Marine Corps alike. In addition, many foreign military air arms developed their own FAC capability in similar fashion during and after the WW2 era.

== See also ==
- The Hump
- Department of Air Training
- Obsolete badges of the United States military
- Military badges of the United States
