= Aviation Cadet Training Program (USAAF) =

Aviation pilot training program

University of Illinois at Urbana–Champaign aeronauts on 30 January 1918

The Flying/Aviation Cadet Pilot Training Program was originally created by the U.S. Army to train its pilots. Originally created in 1907 by the U.S. Army Signal Corps, it expanded as the Army's air assets increased.

== Requirements ==
Candidates originally had to be between the ages of 19 and 25, athletic, and honest. Two years of college or three years of a scientific or technical education were required. This requirement was relaxed in January, 1942, after research on the qualifying exam showed that its scores were sufficiently predictive. Army Air Forces Cadets were supposed to be unmarried and pledged not to marry during training. From 1907 to 1920, pilot officers were considered part of the Signal Corps or the Signal Officer Reserve Corps. After 1920, they were considered part of their own separate organization, the U.S. Army Air Service (1918–1926).

== Locations ==
The U.S. Army Air Corps Training Center (USAACTC) was at Duncan Field, San Antonio, Texas, from 1926 to 1931 and Randolph Field from 1931 to 1939. Two more centers were activated on 8 July 1940: the West Coast Army Air Corps Training Center (WCAACTC) in Sunnyvale, California, and the Southeast Army Air Corps Training Center (SAACTC) in Montgomery, Alabama. The SAACTC was later renamed the Gulf Coast Army Air Corps Center (GCAACTC). In 1942, the Army moved the WCAACTC from Moffett Field to Santa Ana Army Air Base (SAAAB), located on West 8th Street in Santa Ana, California.

On 23 January 1942 the USAAF created the separate Air Corps Flying Training Command and the Air Corps Technical Training Command to control all aspects of technical and aviation training. Originally formed in Washington, D.C., they moved to facilities at Fort Worth, Texas, in July. They were renamed the Army Air Forces Flight Training Command and Army Air Forces Technical Training Command respectively in March, 1942. They were later unified as the Army Air Forces Training Command (July 1943 – June 1946).

== Aviation cadet centers ==
- Gulf Coast Army Air Corps Center (GCAACTC)– Randolph Field, San Antonio, Texas (1931–47).
- West Coast Army Air Corps Training Center (WCAACTC) – Moffett Field, Sunnyvale, California (1940–41). Santa Ana Army Air Base (SAAAB); Santa Ana, California (1942–1947).
- Southeast Army Air Corps Training Center (SAACTC) – Maxwell Field, Montgomery, Alabama (1940–47). From 1942, classification and pre-flight took place at Nashville AAC, Tennessee.

From 1947, the Aviation Cadet program was run by the now-independent U.S. Air Force from Lackland, Kelly, Randolph, or Brooks AFB, all located in San Antonio, Texas. The Air Force program stopped taking civilian and enlisted pilot candidates in 1961 and navigator candidates in 1965.

== Enlisted pilots (1912–42) ==
The first enlisted U.S. Army pilot was Corporal Vernon L. Burge, a crew chief at the U.S. Army's flight school in the Philippines. When Captain Frank P. Lahm, the school's commander, couldn't find enough commissioned officer applicants, he trained Burge, who received his FAI pilot's license on 14 June 1912. Although the practice was officially condemned, the Army later relented, as Burge was already a trained aviator.

The second was Corporal William A. Lamkey. Lamkey entered the Army Signal Corps in 1913, but had already received his FAI license from the Moisant Aviation School in 1912. Lamkey later left the Army to work as a mercenary pilot.

The third pilot was Sergeant William C. Ocker. Ocker was denied pilot training because he was an enlisted man, so he became an aircraft mechanic instead. In his off hours he exchanged work for flight lessons from the nearby Curtiss Flying School. Eventually, he qualified for his FAI license on 20 April 1914, receiving certificate #293. Ocker did mostly test pilot work to accrue flight hours and tested many experimental or early prototype aircraft. He is famous for inventing "blind flying" training to teach pilots to fly by instruments in cloudy or dark conditions.

=== World War I (1914–18) ===
Only 29 enlisted pilots were created by 1914 and most were commissioned as second lieutenants in 1917.

From 1914 to 1918, sixty mechanics were trained as pilots. They were used as ferry pilots and did not fly in combat. Their primary job was to transfer new and repaired aircraft from rear areas to air bases and forward air fields. They would then fly patched-up damaged aircraft back for more thorough repairs.

The Army Air Corps Act of 1926 set certain standards as part of a five-year program to expand and improve the aviation arm of the U.S. Army. It set a quota that 20% of a tactical aviation unit's pilot billets must be manned by enlisted pilots by 1929. By 1930, only 4% of all pilots were enlisted. New pilots were usually commissioned to meet the need for pilot-rated officers in Air Corps administrative and command billets. Enlisted pilots didn't have a place in the hierarchy when they stopped flying and either reverted to their old pre-flying trade or were discharged.

In 1933, the training and creation of enlisted pilots was discontinued due to budget cuts and lack of funds.

=== World War II (1939–45) ===
In 1939 there were only 55 enlisted pilots in the then-U.S. Army Air Corps (USAAC).

On 3 June 1941, Public Law 99 was enacted, allowing enlisted men to apply to flight training. Candidates had to be between the ages of 18 and 22, have a high school diploma with at least 1.5 credit hours worth of math, and have graduated in the top half of their class. In November 1941, this was reduced to being at least 18 years old and possessing a high school diploma. After demand lifted in mid-1944, the requirements went back to college-educated or college graduate candidates.

Enlisted pilots were called flying sergeants. Graduating enlisted pilots were graded as flight staff sergeants while pilots who graduated at the top of their class were graded as flight technical sergeants. They were usually assigned to flying transport and liaison aircraft. Their pilot status was only indicated by their pilot's wings, often leading to enlisted aviators being mistaken for air crew or harassed for impersonating a pilot. This caused a lot of bad feelings between the enlisted pilots (who had more dangerous jobs for lower pay and no privileges) and the officer pilots (who received the same pay, promotability, and privileges as officers).

The first enlisted pilot cadets were part of class 42C (enrolling in November, 1941 and graduating on 7 March 1942), which trained at Kelly Field and Ellington Field, Texas. 93 enlisted graduates became P-38 fighter pilots and were assigned to the 82nd Fighter Group in North Africa. Members of this class shot down 130 enemy aircraft and nine became aces.

The program created 2,576 enlisted pilots from 1941 to 1942. 332 enlisted pilots served overseas and 217 of them flew combat missions. Enlisted pilots destroyed 249.5 enemy aircraft and 18 became aces. Lt. William J. Sloan was the leading ace of the 12th Air Force with 12 victories.

When Public Law 658 (Flight Officer Act) was passed on 8 July 1942 most enlisted pilots were promoted to the new rank of flight officer and newly-graduating enlisted pilots were graded as flight officers or second lieutenants depending on merit. This ended the creation of enlisted pilots in the U.S. Army.

=== Overview ===
The U.S. Army created almost 3,000 enlisted pilots from 1912 to 1942. Seven pre-War enlisted pilots and four World War II enlisted pilots became U.S. Air Force generals.

==== Last enlisted pilot ====
The U.S. Air Force's last enlisted pilot was Master Sergeant George H. Holmes (1898–1965). Holmes had enlisted in the Army as a mechanic in 1919, became a pilot with the rank of corporal in 1921, and was promoted to lieutenant's rank in the Army Reserve in 1924. The Army later made Holmes an enlisted man and he served as both a mechanic and a pilot in the 1920s and 1930s. He was promoted to captain in 1942 and achieved the rank of lieutenant colonel in 1946. He resigned his commission and reverted to his enlisted rank of master sergeant in 1946. He continued to fly as a non-commissioned officer until he retired in May 1957.

== Flying Cadet Program (1918–40) ==
In 1918, flying cadets wore standard Army uniform and were differenced by a white piqué hatband on the service cap or service hat and white brassards on both sleeves. Flying cadets were dubbed "Twelve-and-a-halfs" because they were considered between pay grade 12 (officer cadet) and pay grade 13a (regimental sergeant major) in rank, being neither officer nor enlisted. Cadets were paid the same as Privates, but earned a 50% bonus for flight pay.

In June 1918, the Air Service insignia of a winged single-prop propeller replaced the Signal Corps insignia. In 1925, they were allowed to wear the overseas cap and had branch of service piping of ultramarine blue with threads of golden orange.

From 1928 to 1942, flying cadets wore a distinctive slate-blue uniform. Visor-cap insignia was a pair of gold wings (3 inches wide) and a silver propeller (2 inches high). Flight cadet insignia was worn on the lower right sleeve. Rank insignia was worn on the upper sleeves and consisted of 1 to 4 point-down black mohair chevrons on slate blue backing to indicate the following equivalent ranks: cadet corporal (1 chevron), cadet sergeant (2 chevrons), cadet lieutenant (3 chevrons), and cadet captain (4 chevrons). Chevrons were 2.875-inches wide for jackets and shirts and 7-inches wide for overcoats.

=== 1907–17 ===
The U.S. Army Signal Corps Aviation School was first based at College Park, Maryland, from 1907 to 1912. It later moved in 1912 to Rockwell Field, North Island, San Diego, California.

In 1912 the requirements and rank of Military Aviator were created for heavier-than-air aircraft pilots; the rank of Military Aeronaut was for lighter-than-air aircraft pilots. (Previous to this all American military pilots were certified by civilian aviation bodies). The first 24 certified pilots awarded this distinction (and the accompanying Signals Corps Military Aviator badge) were listed in War Department General Order No. 39 (27 May 1913). This was later split in 1914 into the ranks of Student Pilot (which granted a 25% increase in pay), Junior Military Aviator (for certified Enlisted Pilots and Lieutenants, granting a 50% increase in pay) and Military Aviator (for Captains and above; granting a 75% increase in pay but also requiring 3 years of flight experience). Junior Military Aviators who participated in regular and full-time flight would be paid at the next pay grade (e.g., Flight 2nd Lieutenants would be paid the same as a 1st Lieutenant). Reserve Military Aviators had a commission in the Army Reserves; this meant they had fewer billets, a slower career progression, and less job security than Regular Army pilots.

=== 1917–18 ===
To meet the increased demand for pilots, the Signal Corps Aviation School was shut down during World War I and its functions moved to other facilities. Rockwell Field was closed in 1920 and just used for storage.

Student training was in three stages:

1. Ground School was created on 12 May 1917. Students were taught the basics of flight, airplane operation and maintenance, meteorology, astronomy, military science, and officer etiquette. It lasted 8 weeks (extended to 12 in 1918) and took place at the U.S. Schools of Military Aeronautics at Massachusetts Institute of Technology, Cornell University, University of Texas, University of Illinois at Urbana–Champaign, University of California at Berkeley, and Ohio State.
2. Preliminary Flight School was next. This was taught at flight centers across the country. Facilities included Selfridge Field, Michigan; Chanute and Scott Fields, Illinois; Wilbur Wright Field, Ohio; Kelly, Taliaferro, Love, Call, Rich, and Ellington Fields Texas; Post Field, Fort Sill, Oklahoma; and Gerstner Field, Louisiana. Cadets had about 40–50 flight hours in Curtiss JN-4 Jenny biplanes: 4–10 hours of dual training, 24 hours of solo flying, and a 16-hour cross-country flight. Graduates were certified as Reserve Military Aviators in the Army Signal Corps.
3. Advanced Flight Training took place in the United Kingdom, France, or Italy. Cadets were trained on their assigned aircraft for about 90 hours before being sent into combat in Europe.

During World War I the rank of Junior Military Aviator was indicated by a US Shield with one wing. The rank of Military Aviator was indicated by a US shield flanked by a pair of wings.

On 9 July 1918 the rank of Flying Cadet was created by act of Congress.

=== 1919–21 ===
Cadet training was in two stages.

1. Preliminary Training was for four months (combining Ground and Preliminary Flight School) and was held at Carlstrom Field, Florida, or March Field, California.
2. Advanced Training was for three months. It was held at Post, Kelly, or Ellington Fields.

=== 1922–26 ===
The Air Service consolidated all its training at San Antonio, Texas, in June 1922. This was to save money and provide good year-round flying conditions.

1. Primary Training was extended to five months at Brooks Field.
2. Advanced Training was extended to six months at Kelly Field.

=== 1926–38 ===
The Army Air Corps Act of 1926 set certain reforms as part of a five-year program to expand and improve the aviation arm of the Army. The U.S. Army Air Service would have its name changed to the U.S. Army Air Corps, to reflect its new role as a combatant military force. The post of "Assistant Secretary of War for Air" post was created to foster development of military aviation and an Aviation Section was added to each division of the Army General Staff. Around 90% of an aviation unit's officers had to receive pilot or observer rating and only flight-rated officers could command aviation units.

The Air Corps Training Center was built at Duncan Field, near Kelly Field, in 1926. This was moved to Randolph Field on 1 October 1931.

1. Primary and Basic Training were extended to eight months each and were held at the Air Corps Training Center.
2. Advanced Training was reduced to four months and was held at Kelly Field.

=== 1939–40 ===
In 1938 the U.S. Army Air Corps was expanded to 24 groups by 1939. This required an influx of cadets to meet the requirements. There were three 12-week cycles (or about nine months total).

1. Primary Flight Training was performed by contracted civilian flight schools.
2. Basic Flight Training was performed at Randolph Field.
3. Advanced Flight Training was done at Kelly Field and Brooks Field.

== Aviation Cadet Program (USAAF), 1940–47 ==
=== 1940–41 ===
Cadet flight training was reduced in 1940 to seven months of training and only 200 flight hours to meet a potential demand for military pilots. From 30 June 1940 to 30 June 1941 the US Army Air Corps tripled in size from 51,165 men (19.1% of the Army's total strength) to 152,125 men (10.4% of the Army's total strength).

=== 1941–47 ===
On 20 June 1941, the air arm of the U.S. Army previously known as the U.S. Army Air Corps (USAAC) became the "U.S. Army Air Forces" (USAAF). The grade of Aviation Cadet was created for pilot candidates and the program was renamed the Aviation Cadet Training Program (AvCad). Cadets were paid $75 a month ($50 base pay + $25 "flight pay") – the same rate as Army Air Corps privates with flight status – and a uniform allowance of $150. As junior officers, cadets were addressed as "Mister" by all ranks. The program was expanded in May 1942 to also cover training navigators and bombardiers and Moffett Field became the first center to give "pre-flight" training to them. Other specialties covered included communications, armament, meteorology, and radar operation; they were conventional Army warrant officers who attended an appropriate USAAF warrant officer school.

From May 1942 to 1947, aviation cadets wore the same uniform as Army officers, except they lacked the mohair cuffband of a full officer. The service cap differed in that it had a blue hatband (with olive drab uniform) or brown hatband (with Khaki uniform) and the general issue eagle was replaced by the winged propeller insignia of the Army Air Forces. The garrison cap was worn with the Army Air Forces insignia on the left side.

Rank stripes were light olive drab (brown) on a dark blue backing and were 3.125-inches wide on shirts and coats and 7.5-inches wide on overcoats. This created a problem because the new stripes were just being produced and the old stripes were becoming scarce. Therefore, in January 1943 the Army authorized training center commanders to procure commercially-made versions to meet demand. This led to non-standard designs (like dark blue or black chevrons on olive drab backings) and unique duty position insignias.

The USAAF rank of flight officer was created by Public Law 658 (Flight Officer Act). Its insignia was similar to the warrant officer (junior grade) insignia except for the color of its enamel backing. It was in blue enamel for Air ratings (pilot, navigator, bombardier, flight engineer, or fire control officer – graduates of the aviation cadet program) and brown enamel for Ground ratings (radar operator, armorer, meteorologist, etc. – graduates of the USAAF's warrant officer schools). Air ratings were promotable to second lieutenant and ground ratings were promotable to chief warrant officer. Air ratings outranked ground ratings.

The warrant officer's bars were worn horizontally on the shoulder straps of the shirt or jacket, like a lieutenant's or captain's bars. Co-pilot flight officers – an air rating – wore brown-enamel ground chief warrant officer insignia when flying. This was so they would not be confused with a pilot flight officer, the plane's commander.

After the attack on Pearl Harbor and the United States' entry into the war, the number of volunteers for pilot training was enormous. Fearing that they would lose them to the general draft, aviation cadet-applicants were given exemption from 1942 until the demand lessened in July, 1944.

Demand for pilots meant that training had to be modified to accommodate the large numbers of pilot candidates. Training came in four stages (extended to five stages in April 1942 with the creation of the pre-flight stage). Classification lasted one week and the education and training stages were nine weeks each. Each 9-week stage was divided into two 4.5-week (63-day) halves: a lower half and an upper half . The lower half was made up of students just beginning the stage and the upper half was made up of the students who were half-finished. The more experienced cadets would hopefully help the new cadets get through the section before they were promoted to the next stage.

- On-line Training was the term for busy work given to cadets when there were no open spaces in the next level. They did any unskilled menial task that needed doing until a billet opened up.
- Classification stage processed the cadet and issued him his equipment. This was the stage where it would be decided whether the cadet would train as a navigator, bombardier, or pilot. Candidates who failed the testing or the advanced physical were returned to the regular Army.
- Pre-flight stage was divided into two parts and was attended by pilots, navigators, and bombardiers. The first six weeks was a compressed "boot camp" that concentrated on athletics and military training. This was followed by four weeks of academics. They were taught the mechanics and physics of flight and required the cadets to pass refresher courses in mathematics and physics. Then the cadets were taught to apply their knowledge practically by teaching them aeronautics, deflection shooting, and thinking in three dimensions. Cadets were evaluated for 10 hours in a crude flight simulator called a "blue box", then performed a harrowing "ride-along" with a pilot-instructor for an hour. Those that passed were given Cadet Wings and were promoted to Pilot School.

==== USAAF schools ====
Pilot School

1. Primary Pilot Training taught basic flight using two-seater training aircraft. This was usually done by contract schools (civilian pilot training schools) through the Civil Aeronautics Authority – War Training Service (CAA-WTS). Cadets got around 60 to 65 flight hours in Stearman, Ryan, or Fairchild primary trainers before going to Basic.
2. Basic Pilot Training taught the cadets to fly in formation, fly by instruments or by aerial navigation, fly at night, and fly for long distances. Cadets got about 70 flight hours in BT-9 or BT-13 basic trainers before being promoted to Advanced Training.
3. Advanced Pilot Training placed the graduates in two categories: single-engined and multi-engined. Single-engined pilots flew the AT-6 advanced trainer. Multi-engined pilots learned to fly the AT-9, AT-10, AT-11 or AT-17 advanced trainers. Cadets were supposed to get a total of about 75 to 80 flight hours before graduating and getting their pilot's wings.
4. Transition Pilot Training Single-engined pilots transitioned to fighters and fighter-bombers and multi-engined pilots transitioned to transports or bombers. Pilots got two months of training before being sent into combat duty.

Graduates were usually graded as flight officers (warrant officers). Cadets who graduated at the top of their class were graded as second lieutenants. Aviation cadets who washed out of pilot training were sent to navigator or bombardier school. Aviation cadets who washed out of navigator or bombardier training were usually sent to Flexible Gunnery School to become aerial gunners.

Liaison Pilot School lasted 60 flight hours. It was an option for cadets who had passed primary training, but had washed out of basic or advanced training. They were trained to fly single-engined light aircraft similar to the light trainers they flew in Primary and were given training in takeoffs over obstacles, short-field landings, and low-altitude navigation. Their duties included transportation of troops and supplies, medical evacuation, aerial photography, and low-level reconnaissance. Graduates received liaison pilot wings. They were originally graded as flight staff sergeants until 1942, when they were graded as flight officers.

Bombardier School lasted 18 weeks. It consisted of 425 hours of ground instruction in the proficiencies of a bombardier (plus familiarity with the tasks of the pilot, radioman, or navigator in case of an emergency). After 3 weeks this included 120 hours of air training in which the cadet began with practice runs and ended by performing bombing runs with live ordnance. Graduates received a bombardier's wings.

Navigator School lasted 18 weeks. It consisted of 500 hours of ground instruction in the duties of a navigator (charting, directional bearings, computed headings, airspeed, radio codes, celestial navigation, etc.). This was combined with familiarity with the tasks of a pilot or radioman in case of emergency. After four weeks the cadet acted as a navigator in day and night flights in Advanced Navigator trainers like the AT-7 Navigator or AT-11A Kansan. Graduates received a navigator's wings.

Radio Operator School lasted 18 weeks and was run by the U.S. Army Signals Corps. Graduates received the rank of sergeant, with the top percentage receiving the rank of staff sergeant. They wore the Army Air Corps insignia. There was no official Radio Operator's wings – there were many tailor-made ones cast or made from regular wings by jewelers or embroidered on cloth.

Flexible Gunnery School was a six-week program that taught the cadet how to man a flexible-mount machinegun or a powered turret. All aircrew had to attend gunnery school in case of emergencies and had to qualify before they could join an aircrew. Flight engineers manned the top powered turret as one of their jobs. Bombardiers and navigators attended either before or after they attended their training school. Aircrew assigned as gunners who graduated received Aerial Gunner wings.

== Aviation Cadet Training (USAF), 1947–1961/1965 ==
In September 1947, the U.S. Army Air Forces became a separate and independent service, renamed the United States Air Force (USAF). At the time, the newly created Air Force had no service academy of its own yet (the USMA and USNA had options for their cadets and midshipmen, respectively, to become USAF officers). Separate Air Force ROTC and Officer Candidate School (later retitled Officer Training School) programs were still being established. The Aviation Cadet Training Program continued to remain as a principal source of the Air Force's pilots and navigators and they wore the same basic uniform as Air Force officers.

=== 1952–1961 ===
In 1952, the Air Training Command (ATC) implemented a four-phase pilot training program: pre-flight, primary, basic, and advanced / crew.

- Pre-Flight weeded out unfit applicants and sorted candidates into pilot, navigator, and other aircrew categories.

Pilots

- Primary Training had pilots fly T-6 Texans for about 130 hours, soloing for 20 to 25 hours. In the mid-1950s, the T-6 was replaced by the T-34A Mentor.
- Basic Training had pilots fly T-28 Trojans for 55 hours.
- Advanced Training had pilots destined for fighter aircraft flying jet trainers like the T-33 Shooting Star for 75 hours; pilots destined for large multiengine bomber, tanker/transport or reconnaissance aircraft flew a similar number of hours in the TB-25 Mitchell, while helicopter pilots would follow a similar track in training helicopters of various types. In the final two years of the program, all fixed-wing pilots merged into a single training track flying the T-37 Tweet and T-38 Talon as the T-6, T-34, T-28 and T-33 were phased out of the ATC inventory.

Navigators

Navigator training of the period commenced in the TC-45 Expeditor or TB-25 Mitchell, followed by transition to the T-29 Flying Classroom, although by the late 1950s, all aircrew training had been consolidated in the T-29. Navigator training for Aviation Cadets was merged with that for commissioned officers and conducted at James Connally AFB, Texas; Harlingen AFB, Texas; Ellington AFB, Texas and Mather AFB, California. Follow-on training qualified some of these navigators in additional fields, such as radar navigator/bombardier, electronic warfare officer or radar intercept officer.

=== End of AvCad ===
The USAF Aviation Cadet program ended for pilots in 1961 and navigators in 1965. In 1960, the Air Force implemented the Undergraduate Pilot Training (UPT) and Undergraduate Navigator Training (UNT) concept. From now on the United States Air Force Academy (started in the fall semester of 1959), the Air Force Reserve Officer Training Corps, and the Air Force Officer Training School were to provide all of its pilots and navigators.

==== Last Aviation Cadet pilot ====
The last Aviation Cadet pilot classes were Webb AFB class 61G and Reese AFB class 62A. The last Aviation Cadet pilot to graduate was 2nd Lieutenant William F. Wesson, the only member of Reese AFB class 62B-2, on 11 October 1961. Wesson was originally a member of class 62A but was injured during a training accident and had to recover and requalify before he could graduate.

==== Last Aviation Cadet navigator ====
The last Aviation Cadet navigator class was 65–15 at James Connally AFB. It was made up of Eulalio Arzaga, Jr., James J. Crowling, Jr., Ronald M. Durgee, Harry W. Elliott, Timothy J. Geary, Robert E. Girvan, Glen D. Green, Paul J. Gringot, Jr., William P. Hagopian, Steven V. Harper, Robert D. Humphrey, Hollis D. Jones, Evert F. Larson, Gerald J. Lawrence, Thomas J. Mitchell, Ronald W. Oberender, Raymond E. Powell, Victor B. Putz, Milton Spivack, Donald E. Templeman, and Herbert F. Turney. These aviation cadets became USAF 2nd lieutenants. and were awarded their navigator wings on 3 March 1965. Class 65-15 chose classmate Cadet Steven V. Harper of Miami, Florida, for the honor of "Last Aviation Cadet" based on his high academic, military, and flying grades.

==== Last Aviation Cadet in USAF service ====
On 1 November 2002, Lt Gen Russell C. Davis retired after 44 years of service (5 years in the regular Air Force and 39 years in the Air National Guard). He was the first Black USAF officer to reach the rank of brigadier general in the Air National Guard and was the first Black general officer to command the National Guard Bureau (1998–2002).

== See also ==
- Sergeant Pilot
- Aviation Cadet Training Program (USN)
- Department of Air Training (US Army Ground Forces).
- Civilian Pilot Training Program
