= George Augustus Holmes =

English artist

George Augustus Mortimer Leigh Holmes (c. 1826 – 30 March 1911), known as George Augustus Holmes, was an English artist.

Holmes worked in oils, and his subjects are mostly scenes of everyday rural life. Most of his paintings were exhibited at the Suffolk Street Gallery of the Society of British Artists, and his work first appeared at the Royal Academy in 1852. He also exhibited at the British Institution, the Grosvenor Gallery, and finally at the Salon of the Académie des Beaux-Arts in Paris between the years 1906 and 1911.

His painting “Can’t you talk?”, showing a small child on the floor with a collie dog, was widely pirated for popular chromolithographs and engravings, as the copyright laws were so weak in 19th-century Britain and America.

Holmes died in 1911, aged 84, when he was living in Chelsea, London, and left an estate valued at £2,568. There was a coroner’s inquest, as the artist had sent three pictures to the Royal Academy only a few days before, and his death was sudden and unexpected.
