= George Holmes (rugby union) =

Irish rugby union player

- Full name: George William Holmes
- Born: 1893 Rathmines, Dublin, Ireland
- Died: April 1928 (aged 35) Glenageary, Dublin, Ireland

Rugby union career
- Position: Centre
International career
Years	Team	Apps	(Points)
1912–13	Ireland	3	(0)

George William Holmes (1893 – 1928) was an Irish international rugby union player.

Born in Dublin, Holmes was educated at Trinity College Dublin, where in addition to playing rugby he was captain of the swimming club. He was a centre three–quarter in rugby and gained a total of three Ireland caps, debuting against the 1912–13 Springboks at Lansdowne Road.

Holmes served as a second lieutenant with the Cheshire Regiment in World War I.

== See also ==
- List of Ireland national rugby union players
