= U.S. Air Force aeronautical rating =

Military aviation skill standards

USAF Command Pilot wings

U.S. Air Force aeronautical ratings are military aviation skill standards established and awarded by the United States Air Force for commissioned officers participating in "regular and frequent flight", (Note: The standard by which flight status has been defined in law, executive orders, and regulations since 1913.) either aerially or in space, in performance of their duties. USAF aeronautical badges, commonly referred to as "wings" from their shape and their historical legacy, are awarded by the Air Force in recognition of degrees of achievement and experience. Officers earning these badges and maintaining their requirements are classified as rated officers and receive additional pay and allowances.

The first U.S. military aviator ratings were awarded in 1912, and the issuance of badges for recognition of the award began in 1913. The division of ratings into multiple skill levels and categories began in 1914 and expanded during World War I. With minor variations in numbers and titles of ratings, the system remained largely unchanged until 1940, when the current system of pilot ratings was introduced. During World War II, as many as 19 aeronautical ratings were recognized and awarded by the Army Air Forces, but most were discontinued after the war when the USAF came into being.

USAF ratings gradually expanded until seven categories and 21 ratings exist currently. The most recent change added the RPA (Remotely Piloted Aircraft) Pilot rating, effective 13 December 2010. Although in much smaller numbers, enlisted personnel were historically eligible to be rated until 1949. Since the later 1950s, highly trained enlisted personnel, along with officers whose duties do not include flying, are recognized by the awarding of Air Force Occupational Badges. In 2016, the Air Force opened RPA pilot positions to enlisted personnel, making them the first enlisted pilots since 1949.

== Overview ==
For all categories of aeronautical ratings, to be eligible for the rating and to wear the appropriate badge, an officer must be medically qualified to fly and also be qualified by flying status proficiency. Certified flight officers who develop medical conditions that disqualify them from flying are classified DNIF (Duties Not Including Flying). DNIF may be temporary or permanent. Officers placed on permanent DNIF status are either cross-trained into another career field, or separated from the Air Force, depending on the severity of their medical condition.

The Astronaut "qualifier" is awarded only by the Air Force Chief of Staff for rated officers formally qualified to perform duties at least 50 miles above the earth's surface and who have participated in at least one operational mission, and has a distinctive Astronaut Badge, consisting of a "shooting star" qualifier device superimposed on their rated badge.

The seven categories of aeronautical ratings, as authorized by Title 10, U.S.C. 8691, are:

- Pilot: awarded by the Commander or delegated wing commanders, Air Education and Training Command (AETC)
- Navigator: awarded by the Commander or delegated wing commanders, AETC (Note: Navigator remains a rated category, but is in the process of being phased out in favor of the more comprehensive and versatile CSO category.)
- Combat System Officer (CSO): awarded by the Commander or delegated wing commanders, AETC (Note: Added 25 September 2007. Under a program that began in the fall of 2004 to replace the "Joint Specialized Undergraduate Navigator Training" course, portions of the previous navigator and electronic warfare officer training courses were combined into a curriculum with the objective of developing an aviator with cross-flow capability between the two positions on combat aircraft. The curriculum includes a wider range of topics, with an increased emphasis on warfighting, to develop leadership, decision-making and mission management skills. Navigators and CSOs wear identical badges.)
- Air Battle Manager (ABM): awarded by the Commander or delegated air control wing commanders, AETC
- RPA Pilot: awarded by the Commander or delegated wing commanders, Air Combat Command, (Note: Added 13 December 2010.) or Commander, Air Force Reserve Command (Note: Commander AFRC presents to USAF officers who complete RPA Formal Training Unit in conjunction with Undergraduate RPA Training at March Air Reserve Base, California.)
- Observer: awarded by the Senior Air Force Officer, National Aeronautics and Space Administration. Badge is identical to that worn by USAF Navigators and CSOs. In current practice, is awarded with the Astronaut distinguishing insignia to those USAF officer astronauts who are not previously rated USAF Pilots or USAF Navigators/CSOs. Although identical to the badge worn by Navigators and CSOs, recipients are not graduates of USAF Navigator or CSO training.
- Flight Surgeon: awarded by the Commander, USAF School of Aerospace Medicine

== Evolution of the USAF ratings system ==
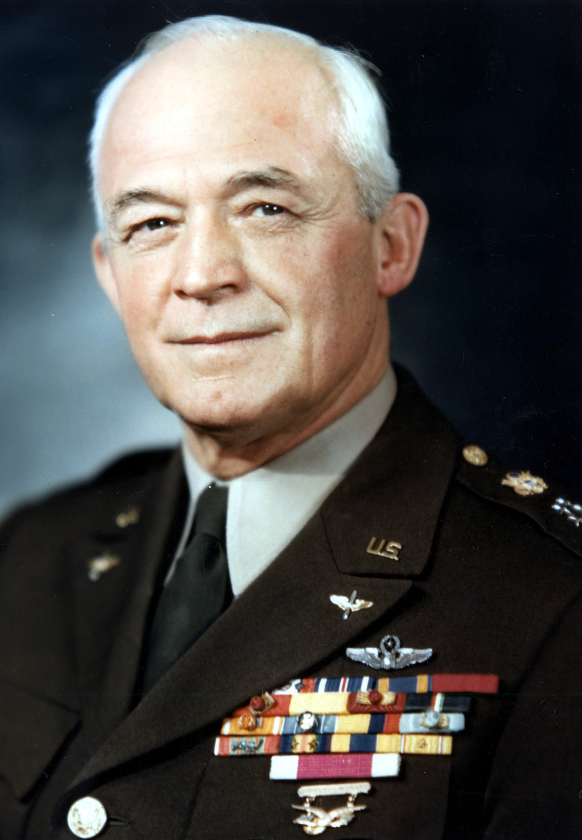
Gen. H.H. Arnold, wearing both Command Pilot and 1913 Military Aviator badges

From the Aviation Act (40 Stat. 243), 24 July 1917:

That officers detailed in or attached to the aviation section of the signal corps may, when qualified therefore, be rated as junior military aviator, military aviator, junior military aeronaut, and military aeronaut ... Provided further, that any officer attached to the aviation section of the signal corps for any military duty requiring him to make regular and frequent flights shall receive an increase of 25 per centum of the pay of his grade and length of service under his commission.

=== Civil ratings ===
Aeronautical ratings were established on 23 February 1912, by War Department Bulletin No. 6, as a new measurement of pilot skill. Before that time most pilots of the Aeronautical Division, Signal Corps soloed by the "short hop method" (also known as "grass-cutting"), in which student pilots, flying alone, learned to handle airplane controls on the ground, taxied in further practice until just short of takeoff speeds, and finally took off to a height of just ten feet, gradually working up to higher altitudes and turns. The practice resulted in the first pilot death only a month into training. At least three of these pilots had been previously instructed by Glenn Curtiss at North Island field, California. Concurrently, two pilots (future General of the Air Force Henry H. Arnold and Thomas DeWitt Milling) were instructed by the Wright Brothers and certified by the Fédération Aéronautique Internationale (FAI) in July 1911.

=== Military Aviator ===
To establish formal standards of certification, the Army created the Military Aviator rating and published requirements on 20 April 1912. The first rating was awarded to Henry H. Arnold on 5 July 1912. The first rating requirements were:

- Attain an altitude of at least 2,500 feet;
- Pilot an aircraft for at least five minutes in a wind of 15 m.p.h. velocity or greater;
- Carry a passenger to an altitude of 500 feet, with a combined weight of pilot and passenger of 250 pounds or more, and make a deadstick landing to within 150 feet of a designated point; and
- Make a military reconnaissance flight of at least 20 miles cross-country at an average altitude of 1,500 feet.

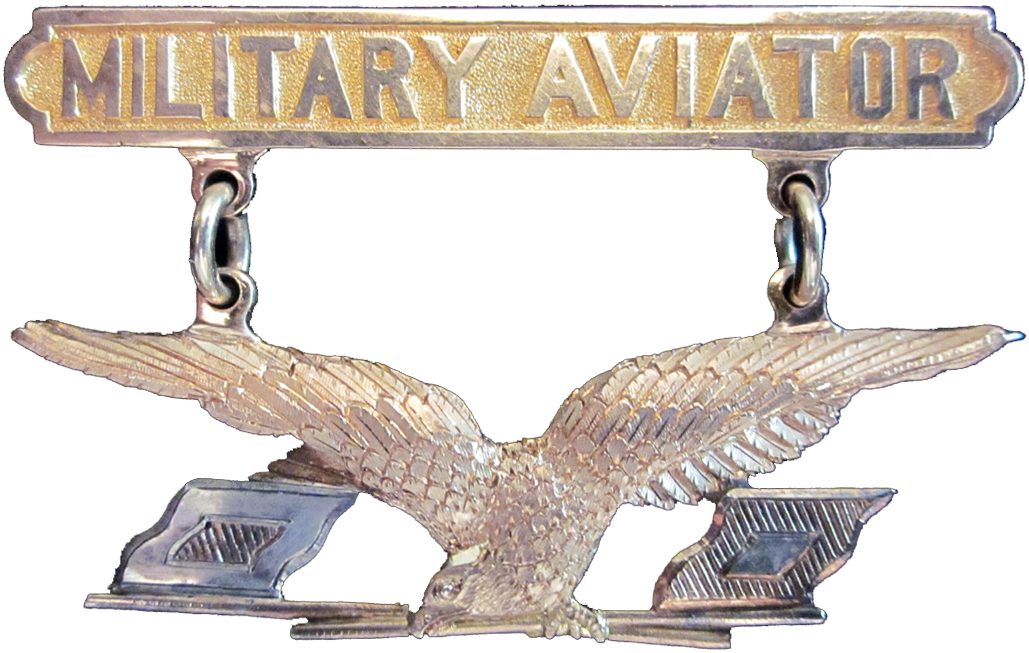
Military Aviator badge, 1913

War Department General Order No. 39, dated 27 May 1913, certified 24 officers including Arnold as "qualified", and authorized issuance of a certificate and badge. A number of designs for the badge were considered before the War Department chose that of an eagle holding Signal Corps flags in its talons, suspended from a bar embossed with "Military Aviator", and had the dies manufactured. A group of 14 aviators still detailed to the Signal Corps was recommended on 29 September 1913 to receive the badge, and the two gold proofs were issued 16 October 1913, to Captain Charles DeF. Chandler and Lt. Thomas D. Milling, both of whom had also received the first ratings with Arnold on 5 July 1912. All 24 officers certified by G.O. 39, or their survivors, (Note: One (1st Lt. J. D. Park) was killed in an accident before G.O. 39 was issued, and two (1st Lts. E.L. Ellington and H.M. Kelly) were killed together in the Philippines before theirs were delivered.) were eventually issued the badge.

Two levels of qualification were specified in War Department Bulletin No. 35 on 4 May 1914, with aviators below the rank of captain to be rated as Junior Military Aviator and those captain and above to be rated as Military Aviator. Similar ratings were created for the lighter-than-air branch of aviation, termed Military Aeronaut. On 18 July 1914, Congress established the Aviation Section, Signal Corps, incorporating, expanding and superseding the Aeronautical Division, and established in law both flight pay (called the "aviation increase") and the awarding of ratings. The Act of 1914 authorized an aviation increase of 25% in pay to student pilots, 50% to those rated JMA, and 75% to those rated MA. Rated lieutenants who flew "regularly and frequently" were given the temporary rank, pay, and allowances of the next higher grade.

Because a provision also required three years' experience as a JMA in order to become eligible to be rated MA, all remaining Military Aviators had their ratings changed to JMA. None re-acquired the rating (and its "aviation increase") before July 1917. (Note: Nine of those whose ratings were reduced and were still in the ASSC were re-rated the MA in July 1917 and four who had left aviation and returned—Arnold, Frank P. Lahm, Joseph E. Carberry, and Robert H. Willis—were awarded the higher rating under the 3-year requirement after a ruling that their time away from aviation also counted. (Hennessey, p. 229)) The National Defense Act of 1916 eliminated pilot age and rank eligibility restrictions and allowed captains to also draw the temporary rank, pay, and allowances of the next higher grade if required to participate in regular and frequent flight.

=== World War I and Air Service revisions ===
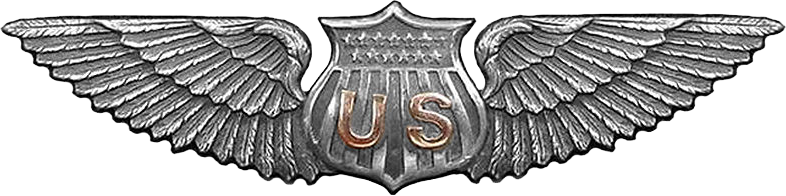
Junior Military Aviator badge, 1917–1919. Initially badges were embroidered and Junior Military Aviator and Reserve Military Aviator badges had only one wing to the wearer's left. The Air Service members of the Bolling Mission encountered credibility problems from wearing their single-winged JMA/RMA badges in Europe, where the design signified "observer" status for the wearer rather than "pilot." Largely through their efforts, the regulation was changed on 27 October 1917 and a two-wing badge was authorized for JMA and RMA as well as the Military Aviator rating, which was denoted by having a star added.

The Military Aviator badge was superseded on 15 August 1917 by authorization of a new embroidered "wings" badge, the first sketches of which are attributed to Arnold. A new rating, Reserve Military Aviator, was authorized on 3 June 1917 to rate pilots during World War I, with all ranks and grades being temporary. (Note: Candidates for Reserve Military Aviator had to pass a medical examination to become an aviation cadet at a civilian flying school, then a preliminary flying test. Nearly all aviation cadets receiving the rating were commissioned as first lieutenants, Signal Officers Reserve Corps, awarded upon successful completion of the "Reserve Military Aviator" test, supervised by an Aviation Section officer or agent. (Only those few rated officers not assigned in orders to the "Aviation Section, Signal Reserve for regular and frequent flights" were commissioned as second lieutenants.) The test in seven parts included a takeoff and climb in a constricted area, gliding and spinning, making a deadstick landing, landing over an obstacle, flying a triangular course by compass, flying a 30-mile cross-country flight by map, and completing a 45-minute endurance flight at 4,000 feet altitude. (Aviation and Aeronautical Engineering, 15 May 1917, Vol. II, No. 8, p. 355.)) The Aviation Act of 24 July 1917 authorized those holding a pre-war JMA rating to advance to MA rating by the three-year rule, and along with RMA holders, by "distinguished service." A wartime Reserve Military Aeronaut rating for balloon pilots was also created, (Note: No one was ever rated a Reserve Military Aeronaut, all balloon ascensions during the war being tethered and manned by observers. (1920 Aircraft Year Book, p. 278)) as was a rating of Observer for both airplanes and balloons, bringing the total number of aeronautical ratings to seven.

After the creation by executive order in 1918 of the Army Air Service, a standard wings-and-shield design for the rating badge, still in use today, was created by sculptor Herbert S. Adams of the United States Commission of Fine Arts and approved on 25 January 1919. Army regulations regarding ratings underwent a major revision by the Director of Air Service on 16 October 1919, when the RMA rating was officially changed to Airplane Pilot (although usage of the RMA terminology continued until 1920), all observers were termed Aerial Observer, and new ratings of Enlisted Pilot, (Note: Enlisted pilots were authorized embroidered wings with a four-bladed propeller instead of a shield in the center, to be worn on the sleeve. However in World War I all enlisted pilots became commissioned. Enlisted pilots between 1919 and 1933, when the rating was discontinued, wore metal wings similar to the embroidered badge. (Callander)) Airship Pilot, Aerial Gunner, and Aerial Bomber were created. Among the new ratings, a 50% aviation increase was authorized for the enlisted pilot and 25% for all the others. The new ratings, however, proved to be only a demobilization expedient and lasted less than nine months. (Note: Two non-flying ratings for aircraft mechanics, "Aviation Mechanician" and "Balloon Mechanician", also received a 50% increase if engaged in flying duty.)

In 1920, when the Air Service was made a statutory arm of the line, the National Defense Act of 1920 also ended the differentials in flight pay and standardized it at 50%. The policy of awarding rated officers a temporary advancement in grade was also terminated. To qualify for command of a unit, an officer was required by law to be rated. The existing ratings were reduced to four on 10 August 1920, (Note: War Department Special Orders 95-0, para. 110, 23 April 1919, awarded six additional officers the rating of "Military Aviator" for "distinguished service" in France during the war: Brig. Gen. Billy Mitchell, Lt. Col. Lewis H. Brereton, Lt. Col. John N. Reynolds, Major Carl A. Spaatz, Major Melvin A. Hall, and Captain Reed M. Chambers. These were the only ratings ever awarded for distinguished service, and when the Military Aviator rating was abolished, these six were permitted to keep it. (Davis, p. 14 and p. 678, note 50.)) combining the ratings of Reserve Military Aviator/Airplane Pilot, Junior Military Aviator, and Military Aviator into the rating of Airplane Pilot and Military Aeronaut and Balloon Observer into the rating of Balloon Observer, renaming the rating of Aerial Observer as Airplane Observer, and continuing the rating of Airship Pilot. All those already holding the old ratings qualified automatically for the new. (Note: The U.S. Naval Air Service and the U.S. Aerial Mail Service also had four aviation ratings.) In 1921 the Air Service authorized the wearing of 3.125-inch ratings badges made of oxidized silver in lieu of embroidered badges.

In 1921 the Air Service also revised its pilot training program, adopting the "A Plan", which divided pilot ratings between Junior Airplane Pilot (completion of primary training, normally an enlisted rating) and Airplane Pilot (completion of advanced training). (Note: Both phases of training were six months in length.) The bulk of new pilots were acquired from the enlisted classification of "flying cadet", with achievement of a JAP rating making a cadet eligible for advanced pilot training and commissioning. However, some older Air Service officers without flying experience, but requiring a rating to remain in the Air Service, acquired a JAP rating, including Chief of Air Service Maj. Gen. Mason Patrick.

In 1924 the Tenth Annual Report of the National Advisory Committee for Aeronautics, submitted by President Calvin Coolidge to the Congress, reported:

The Air Service has 845 officers with rating as airplane pilots, airplane observers, airship pilots, airship observers, or balloon observers. In addition about 51 enlisted men have the rating of airplane pilot, junior airplane pilot, or airship pilot.

=== Air Corps, World War II, Cold War and Post-Cold War changes ===
In 1926, the new Air Corps discarded the A Plan in favor of the B Plan, which awarded only a single rating, Airplane Pilot, requiring completion of all phases of a year-long, three-school (Primary, Basic, and Advanced) flying training course. The Airship School closed in 1928 for economic reasons, ending all increases and replacements in airship ratings. The Air Corps Act of 1926 mandated that 90% of all Air Corps officers be rated, and that for reasons of economy, by 1929 at least 20% of tactical pilots had to be enlisted men. However, the latter requirement was so utterly impractical it was circumvented by the Air Corps with the tacit approval of the War Department. The Air Corps had only 38 rated enlisted men in 1930 (about 4% of all pilots), and nearly every enlisted graduate was being commissioned to decrease deficits in rated officers. Those remaining as enlisted men in the Regular Army held reserve officer commissions in the event of war. (Note: Enlisted personnel qualifying for a pilot rating during World War II, commonly referred to as "sergeant pilots," wore auxiliary pilot wings appropriate to the class of aircraft they flew.)

In 1936, Maj. Gen. Frank M. Andrews, commanding the GHQ Air Force, promulgated a policy requiring newly minted pilots to spend a year flying single-engined aircraft and accruing 750 logged flight hours as a prerequisite to becoming a bomber pilot. Seven years of military flying experience and 2,000 logged hours qualified a pilot as an "airplane commander" in the GHQAF. In 1937 the Army formalized the requirement, creating a new advanced rating of Military Airplane Pilot, setting 12 years as a rated pilot and 2,000 hours of flight time as the standard. The rating of Airship Pilot was discontinued at the same time and that of Airship Observer incorporated into Balloon Observer, leaving the Air Corps with five ratings. (Note: These five ratings were: Military Airplane Pilot, Airplane Pilot, Airplane Observer, Balloon Pilot, and Balloon Observer.)

Between November 1939 and March 1940 pilot ratings were revised to the permanent three-tier system with objective standards that exists today, with a total of eight ratings overall. (Note: AR 600–35 (paragraph 42: "Badge, Aviation") was revised to list the eight rating categories, including a new Senior Balloon Pilot rating, and describe their badges.) Graduation from Advanced Flying School was required to be rated a Pilot; (Note: The rating of Pilot was authorized 21 November 1939.) ten years service and 1,800 hours of military flight for Senior Pilot rating; (Note: The rating of Senior Pilot was authorized 20 February 1940.) and either 15 years service with 3,000 hours, or 20 years service with 2,000 hours, to become a Command Pilot. (Note: The rating of Command Pilot was authorized 23 March 1940.) For both advanced ratings, hours as a pilot or navigator (a specialization then performed only by rated pilots) were calculated at 100%, but military flight hours in any other capacity were calculated at a 50% rate. The Air Corps also divided the former Airplane Observer rating into that of Combat Observer and Technical Observer. (Note: Combat Observer and Technical Observer ratings became effective 23 February 1940.)

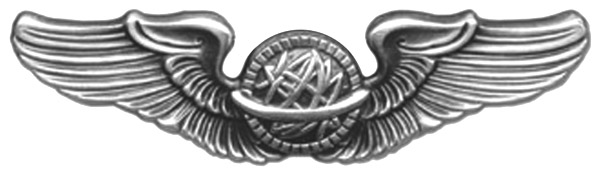
Navigator wings, 1942–1951

Navigator was recognized by the United States Army Air Forces as a rating and authorized its own badge on 4 September 1942, one of a number of new wartime ratings that included Bombardier, the Glider Pilot, Liaison Pilot and Service Pilot ratings (N.B.: these three ratings were typically awarded to soldiers on the basis of prior civilian flying experience, with a higher age limit and relaxed medical requirements for entry vs. the normal Pilot training pipeline; their duty assignments were limited in scope), and enlisted Aircrew ratings. Combat Observer was renamed Aircraft Observer. All of the wartime ratings except Navigator were discontinued by the USAF on 26 July 1949, with Navigator and Bombardier merged into a single Navigator rating and the badge design being changed in 1951 from that of an armillary sphere flanked by wings to that of the USAF shield flanked by wings. At this time, a tiered system of ratings based on hours and years of service was also implemented with Senior Navigator and Master Navigator following the same precepts as Senior Pilot and Command Pilot.

Beginning in 2011, the rating of Navigator was retitled, replaced by the aeronautical rating of Combat Systems Officer (CSO), with the same badge insignia as Navigator. This title change was intended to place the CSO more in line with their Naval Flight Officer (NFO) counterparts of the U.S. Navy and U.S. Marine Corps, especially since the latter have historically enjoyed more robust operational flying command and major command opportunities, to include promotion to 3-star and 4-star rank. Although observer ratings were also discontinued by USAF in 1949, the Observer title was revived in 1981 when a rating was created for otherwise non-aeronautically rated USAF officers who completed NASA mission specialist astronaut training and subsequently flew in space.

Flight Surgeons were rated and received the "aviation increase" between 1918 and 1920. The rating was discontinued in 1920, however, and flight surgeons as a military profession were neglected by the headquarters of the successive Army air arms until late in 1939. In July 1940, the recommendations of a board of flight surgeons appointed by Gen. Arnold were adopted, standardizing ratings requirements as:

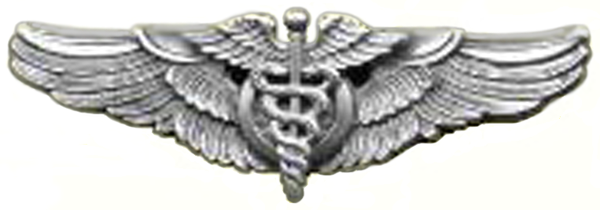
Flight Surgeon wings, Army Air Forces

- graduation from a Class A medical school,
- completion of a one-year rotational internship,
- completion of the School of Aviation Medicine course,
- one year's service in the AAF as an Aviation Medical Examiner, and
- 50 hours of logged military flight.

The Flight Surgeon rating received its own distinctive gold badge on 3 March 1942, which was changed to the standard oxidized silver wings in 1944 to avoid confusion with naval aviator badges.

== USAF rating requirements ==
=== Pilot ratings ===
Pilot Badge

The USAF awards pilot ratings at three levels: Pilot, Senior Pilot, and Command Pilot, to active duty officers and to officers considered as "rated assets" in the Air Force Reserve and Air National Guard (i.e., the Air Reserve Components). Rating standards apply equally to both fixed-wing and helicopter pilots.

The following additional criteria are required to be rated as a USAF Pilot:

Rating	Basic requirement	Flight time	Alternative flight time
Command Pilot	15 years as rated pilot, and; Permanent award of senior pilot rating, and	3,000 total hours, or	2,300 hours primary and instructor flight, or; 144 months Operational Flying Duty (OFDA)
Senior Pilot	7 years as rated pilot, and; Permanent award of pilot rating, and	2,000 total hours, or	1,300 hours (any combination of primary, instructor, and/or evaluator pilot time)
Pilot	Graduate of USAF pilot training program, or; Graduate of other US military pilot training if ordered by USAF, or; Graduate of other US military pilot training if equivalent to USAF program, or; Graduate of helicopter pilot training conducted by another US military service	No time required	

=== RPA Pilot ratings ===
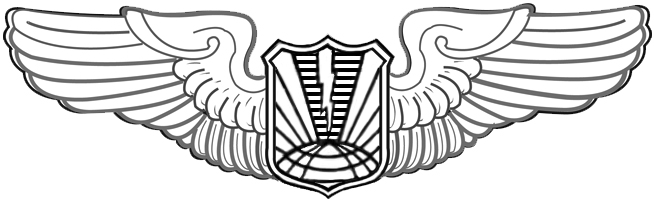
RPA Pilot Badge

The USAF awards remotely piloted aircraft (RPA) pilot ratings at three levels: RPA Pilot, Senior RPA Pilot, and Command RPA Pilot, to active duty officers, to enlisted personnel, and to officers considered as "rated assets" in the Air Reserve Components.

The following additional criteria are required to be rated as a USAF remotely piloted aircraft pilot:

Rating	Basic requirement	Flight time	Alternative flight time
Command RPA Pilot	15 years as rated RPA pilot, and; Permanent award of senior RPA pilot rating, and	3,000 total hours, or	2,300 hours primary and instructor flight, or; 144 months Operational Flying Duty (OFDA)
Senior RPA Pilot	7 years as rated RPA pilot, and; Permanent award of RPA pilot rating, and	2,000 total hours, or	1,300 hours primary and instructor flight
RPA Pilot	Graduate of USAF RPA operator training program, or; Graduate of other US military pilot training if equivalent to USAF program	No time required	

=== Combat System Officer ratings ===
Combat System Officer badge

The Combat System Officer (CSO) rating is awarded to individuals who entered the CSO Undergraduate Flying Training after 1 October 2004. The USAF awards combat system officer ratings at three levels: Combat System Officer, Senior Combat System Officer, and Master Combat System Officer, for active duty officers and officers considered rated assets in the Air Reserve Components. The insignia is identical to USAF Navigator, but rated navigators who are not CSO rated are not eligible for award of advanced CSO ratings. The following additional criteria are required for rating as a USAF Combat System Officer:

Rating	Basic requirement	Flight time	Alternative flight time
Master Combat System Officer	15 years as rated CSO, and; Permanent award of senior CSO rating, and	3,000 total hours, or	2,300 hours primary and instructor time, or; 144 months OFDA
Senior Combat System Officer	7 years as rated CSO, and; Permanent award of CSO rating, and	2,000 total hours, or	1,300 hours primary and instructor time, or; 72 months OFDA
Combat System Officer	Graduate of Combat System Officer Undergraduate Flying Training	No time required	

=== Navigator ratings ===
Navigator Badge

The USAF awards navigator ratings at three levels: Navigator, Senior Navigator, and Master Navigator, for active duty officers and officers considered "rated assets" in the Air Reserve Components. After 2009 only Combat System Operators receive ratings formerly awarded to navigators, as the occupational field is being phased out. The following additional criteria are required for rating as a USAF Navigator:

Rating	Basic requirement	Flight time	Alternative flight time
Master Navigator	15 years as rated navigator, and; Permanent award of senior navigator rating, and	3,000 total hours, or	2,300 hours primary and instructor time, or; 144 months OFDA
Senior Navigator	7 years as rated navigator; Permanent award of navigator rating, or; Interservice transfer to USAF (including Air Reserve Component) of any former USN or USMC Naval Flight Officer with 7 years and similar flight time totals as a designated NFO	2,000 total hours	1,300 hours primary and instructor time, or; 72 months OFDA
Navigator	Graduate of USAF Undergraduate Navigator Training (UNT) / USAF-USN Interservice Undergraduate Navigator Training (IUNT) / USAF-USN Specialized Undergraduate Navigator Training (SUNT), or; Graduate of USN/USMC Naval Flight Officer course, VT-86 (RIO, TN or OJN training pipelines); Graduate of USN Naval Flight Officer (NAV training pipeline) course at either: VT-29 (Advanced Navigation Training Course at NAS Corpus Christi); 323 FTW (Interservice Undergraduate Navigator Training (IUNT) at Mather AFB); or 12 FTW (Specialized Undergraduate Navigator Training (SUNT) at Randolph AFB)	400 hours primary navigator time	None Reviewed by Aeronautical Rating Board and approved by Major Command

=== Air Battle Manager ratings ===
Air Battle Manager Badge

The USAF awards Air Battle Manager ratings at three levels: Air Battle Manager, Senior Air Battle Manager, and Master Air Battle Manager, for active duty officers and officers considered "rated assets" in the Air Reserve Components. The following additional criteria are required to be rated as a USAF Air Battle Manager:

Rating	Basic requirement	Flight time	Alternative flight time
Master Air Battle Manager	15 years as rated ABM, and; Permanent award of senior ABM rating, and	3,000 total hours, or	2,300 hours primary and instructor time, or; 144 months OFDA
Senior Air Battle Manager	7 years as rated ABM, and; Permanent award of ABM rating, and	2,000 total hours, or	1,300 hours primary and instructor time, or; 72 months OFDA
Air Battle Manager	Graduate of E-3 AWACS Formal Training Unit course, (Note: FTU is an umbrella term for both current Undergraduate ABM Training (UABMT) and previous Programmed Flying Training (PFT) in a flying unit) or; Graduate of E-8 J-STARS Formal Training Unit course, or; Graduate of UABMT under new syllabus	No time required	

=== Observer ratings ===
Observer Badge

The USAF awards observer ratings at three levels: Observer, Senior Observer, and Master Observer, for active duty officers and officers considered "rated assets" in the Air Reserve Components. The insignia is identical to USAF Navigator/CSO and is typically only awarded as an "observer" insignia with the Astronaut emblem to USAF officers who have completed training as NASA Mission Specialist Astronauts, have flown at least once in space in the Space Shuttle and/or served at the International Space Station, and are not otherwise rated as USAF Pilots or USAF Navigators/CSOs. The following additional criteria are required to be rated as a USAF Observer:

Rating	Basic requirement	Flight time	Alternative flight time
Master Observer	15 years as rated observer, and; Permanent award of senior observer rating, and	3,000 total hours, or	2,300 hours primary and instructor time, or; 144 months OFDA
Senior Observer	7 years as rated observer, and; Permanent award of observer rating. and	2,000 total hours, or	1,300 hours primary and instructor time, or; 72 months OFDA
Observer	Graduate of NASA Mission Specialist training	No time required	

=== Flight Surgeon ratings ===
Flight Surgeon Badge

The USAF awards flight surgeon ratings at three levels: Flight Surgeon, Senior Flight Surgeon, and Chief Flight Surgeon, for active duty officers and officers considered "rated assets" in the Air Reserve Components. The following additional criteria are required for rating as a USAF Flight Surgeon:

Rating	Basic requirement	Flight time	Alternative flight time
Chief Flight Surgeon	15 years rated service as flight surgeon, and; Permanent award of senior flight service rating, and; 1 year current active service as flight surgeon, and	750 logged hours, or	144 months OFDA
Senior Flight Surgeon	7 years rated service as flight surgeon, and; Permanent award of flight surgeon rating, and; 1 year current active service as flight surgeon, and	350 logged hours, or	72 months OFDA
Flight Surgeon	Graduate of Aerospace Medicine Primary Course, and; Unrestricted medical license, and; Awarded Air Force Specialty Code 48XX	No time required	

== Pilot-Physicians ==
Flight surgeons may also perform duties as Pilot-Physicians (Air Force Specialty Code 48VX). The purpose of pilot-physicians is to provide "integrated operational and aerospace medicine guidance" in the research, development, testing, and evaluation of Air Force systems and missions to realize the greatest effectiveness and cost savings.

Pilot-physicians were previously assigned only to an operational flying squadron in their respective aircraft, with their main assignment as a pilot, but also with clinical duties seeing patients, usually the flight medicine clinic, depending on the pilot-physician's medical specialty. On 21 April 2011 the Pilot-Physician Program (PPP) was completely revised to make "the most of the special resources of Air Force officers who are simultaneously qualified both as pilots and flight surgeons," with a senior pilot-physician selected by the Air Force Surgeon General to be Program Director, and assignment of designated command, staff, research, training, and education billets as well as duty in operational units. A P48VX specialty code is assigned to those on aeronautical orders as a pilot-physician and assigned to one of these designated PPP billets. Pilot-Physicians are entitled to conditional flight pay (ACIP), that is, only if assigned to an active flying position and flying a prescribed number of hours monthly.

In addition to being a rated pilot and a rated flight surgeon, a pilot-physician must have completed at least three years of operational flying and one year as an operational flight surgeon, with a provision for assigning applicants without flight surgeon operational experience to a base where they would likely become a "first assignment pilot-physician". The revised program allows flight surgeons access to undergraduate pilot training and remotely piloted aircraft (RPA) pilot training (one slot per year); allows participation of flight surgeons with experience as navigators, electronic warfare officers, RPA sensor operators, and flight test engineers as navigator-physicians or flight test-physicians; and authorizes pilot-physicians to compete for assignment to USAF Test Pilot School.

Pilot-physicians are defined by four core competencies to achieve program objectives:

- Providing expert guidance through the synthesis of operational and medical experience,
- Conducting research by applying operational insights to studies; basic and applied science; relevant research, development, test & evaluation (RDT&E); and operational test & evaluation (OT&E),
- Teaching aircrew, senior Air Force leaders, and medical personnel on subjects of particular expertise, and
- Conducting analysis to provide recommendations for operational systems, environments, and mishaps; and solutions to human performance problems.

Pilot-physicians are eligible for advanced ratings as both flight surgeons and pilots. They may apply toward advanced pilot ratings any USAF pilot years of aviation service, months of operational flying duty, and total flying hours accrued before achieving flight surgeon status. After attaining status as a pilot-physician, all hours flown as a pilot, and months of operational flying duty credit accrued as a pilot, are "dual-credited" toward both advanced pilot and flight surgeon ratings as long as the officer is on aeronautical orders as an active pilot-physician.

== See also ==
- Badges of the United States Air Force
- Military badges of the United States
- Obsolete badges of the United States military

== Notes ==
Footnotes

Citations
