= Department of Air Training =

The Department of Air Training (1942–1947; 1947–1954) was originally a part of the U.S. Army Ground Force's Field Artillery School at Fort Sill, Oklahoma. It trained Forward Observer pilots to act as organic spotter units for U.S. Army artillery battalions and brigades. The pilots were eventually not just used to adjust artillery fire, but to support naval gunfire, direct bombing missions, perform aerial reconnaissance, conduct medical evacuations, and perform liaison and command and control duties as well.

== Department of Air Training, Army Artillery Corps, 1942–1947 ==
In 1940, the US Army Air Forces began concentrating on building a strategic air force. The Army Artillery Corps feared that the Ground Forces' tactical needs would not be met under the Air Forces' new mission goals. They therefore came up with an agreement in which the Artillery Corps would train their own Forward Observer pilots.

Unlike regular USAAF pilots who graduated as sergeants (later as Flight Officers), graduates of the Department of Air Training became Second Lieutenants in the Artillery Corps.

They were originally trained at the Department of Air Training of the Field Artillery School at Fort Sill, Oklahoma from 1942 to 1954. July 6, 1942, the day the Air Training Department was established, is seen as the birthday of Army Aviation.

- Preliminary (or "Pre-Flight") training for pilot candidates was held at facilities at Kansas State Teachers College of Pittsburg (Pittsburg, Kansas) and North Texas State Teachers College (Denton, Texas).
- Primary and Basic training was at Post Army Airfield, Oklahoma, near the Artillery School at Fort Sill. It was moved to Camp Rucker in 1954.
- Advanced training was at Gary Field, Texas. They were trained to fly the agile L-4 Grasshopper and L-5 Sentinel.

== Department of Air Training, Army Transportation Corps, 1947–1954 ==
After the Air Force became its own separate arm of service in 1947, the Air Training Department came under the control of the Army Transportation Corps. (Army Aviation would not receive its own branch until 1983). They were restricted to reconnaissance and casualty evacuation duties under the Key West Agreement of 1948. The Army's Warrant Officer Pilot Program was begun in 1949 and the first pilots graduated in 1951. The Air Training Department was renamed the Army Aviation School in 1953 and was moved to Camp Rucker in 1954 (later renamed Fort Rucker in 1956). In 1956 the Gary and Wolters Air Force Bases in Texas were transferred from the Air Force to the Army.

Although the Army created its first Helicopter Pilot Training School in 1948, specially-trained Army Air Force pilots had been flying early light helicopters since 1942. The major purpose of the new Warrant Officer Pilots was to create helicopter pilots to meet the perceived future demand. Having Warrant Officers fill the large number of pilot slots rather than officers would leave officer slots open for the other service branches and cut costs.

- The Army Aviation Center was established at Camp Rucker in 1955. It took the place of the Preliminary training module.
- Primary training was at Camp Gary, San Marcos, Texas and Camp Wolters, Mineral Wells, Texas. Students flew the Piper J-3 Cub airplane or the TH-13T helicopter.
- Advanced training was at Post Army Airfield, Oklahoma, near the Artillery School at Fort Sill. It was moved to Camp Rucker in 1954. Fixed Wing students flew the Cessna O-1 Bird Dog airplane. Rotary Wing students flew the Bell OH-13 Sioux, Sikorsky H-19 Chickasaw or Piasecki H-21 Shawnee helicopter.

== See also ==
- Aviation Cadet Training Program (USAAF)
- Aviation Cadet Training Program (USN)
- US Army Aviation School
