= George H. Holmes =

American aviator

- Born: February 6, 1898
- Died: February 9, 1965 (aged 67); Tampa, Florida
- Military career
- Allegiance: American
- Branch: United States Navy (1917–1918); United States Army (1919–1921, 1928–1929, 1931–1946, 1946–1947); United States Air Force (1947–1957)
- Rank: Lieutenant-Colonel

George H. Holmes (February 6, 1898 – February 11, 1965) was the United States Air Force’s last enlisted pilot.

Originally, Holmes served in the United States Navy during World War I. When he tried to reenlist after the war, he was told he would be assigned to a destroyer rather than a shore position. Holmes declined and joined the Army instead.

Holmes enlisted in the Army as a mechanic in 1919, became a pilot with the rank of corporal in 1921 but left the army for civilian life. He joined the Army Reserve with the rank of lieutenant in 1924 and rejoined the army in 1928. He left again in 1929 to fly for Pan Am in South America. He rejoined the Army in 1931 and served as both a mechanic and a pilot in the 1920s and 1930s. He became a sergeant in 1931, a technical sergeant in January, 1940, and a master sergeant in March, 1941. He was breveted as a captain in 1942, promoted to major in 1945 and achieved the rank of lieutenant-colonel before leaving the Air Force in 1946. Only a few months later he re-enlisted for a fourth and final time as a master sergeant.

In 1946 he was one of only 55 remaining enlisted pilots in the Army. When the US Air Force was created as a separate entity in 1947 he was one of only two remaining enlisted pilots. Master Sergeant Tom Rafferty was the other one until he died in a plane crash in 1949. Holmes continued to fly until he retired in May, 1957.
