= Robert Allott =

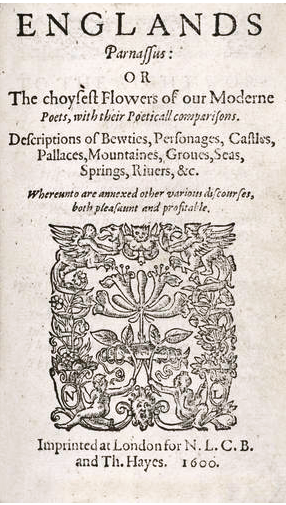
- The title page of Allott's anthology England's Parnassus
- Occupation: editor
- Years active: 1600–1630s
- Notable work: England's Parnassus

Robert Allott (fl. 1600) was an Elizabethan editor of poetry who published the verse compilation England's Parnassus in 1600. He is probably the same Robert Allott who was a fellow of St. John's College, Cambridge. Sonnets in English and Latin are also attributed to Allott, and he may also be the same Robert Allott who was a publisher in the early 17th century.

== Biography ==
Allott was editor of a famous miscellany of Elizabethan poetry, entitled "England's Parnassus; or the choycest Flowers of our Modern Poets, with their Poeticall comparisons, Descriptions of Bewties, Personages, Castles, Pallaces, Mountaines, Groves, Seas, Springs, Rivers, &c. Whereunto are annexed other various discourses, both pleasant and profitable. Imprinted at London for N. L., C. B., and T. H., 1600". The compiler's name is not given on the title-page, but the initials "R. A." are appended to the two preliminary sonnets. Oldys, the antiquary, in the preface to Hayward's British Muse (1738), asserted that he had seen a copy containing the signature "Robert Allott" in full; and it has been solely on Oldys's authority hitherto that the compilation of this valuable anthology has been attributed to Allott. The fact has been overlooked that Dr. Farmer, in a manuscript note in his copy of England's Parnassus, states that he, too, had seen the name "Robert Allott" printed in full. Mr. J. P. Collier, however, in his reprint (Seven English Poetical Miscellanies, 1867), suggests that the initials "R. A." belong to Robert Armin, author of the Nest of Ninnies.

In 1599, a thick duodecimo was published, entitled Wits Theater of the Little World, a prose "collection of the flowers of antiquities and histories". There is no name on the title-page, and the dedication in most copies is addressed "To my most esteemed and approved loving friend, Maister J. B.", and bears no signature. One bibliographer after another ascribes the book to John Bodenham. But there is a copy, in which the dedication is signed "Robert Allott", and "J. B." is printed in full, "John Bodenham". It is thus clear that Allott was the compiler of Wits Theater, and that the book was produced under Bodenham's patronage. Bodenham, it can be shown on other grounds, was not the compiler of the prose and verse miscellanies of the beginning of the seventeenth century, which, like England's Helicon and Wits Theater, have been repeatedly associated with his name; he was merely their projector and patron.

No biographical facts have come down about Allott. Samuel Egerton Brydges surmised that he was the Robert Allott who held a fellowship at St. John's College, Cambridge, in 1599. There was also a publisher of this name in the early part of the seventeenth century; but we have no means of identifying the editor of England's Parnassus with either of his namesakes. Two sonnets by a Robert Allott are prefixed to Gervase Markham's Devereux (1597); his name is appended to a sonnet and six Latin hexameters prefixed to Chr. Middleton's Legend of Duke Humphrey (1600), and a Robert Allott is noticed in John Weever's Epigrams (1599). In each of these cases the Robert Allott is doubtless to be identified with the editor of England's Parnassus, to whom we might also attribute with safety the six Latin hexameters (signed "R. A.") prefixed to "Wits Commonwealth".

== Works ==
England's Parnassus is a thick octavo volume of some five hundred pages. The extracts are arranged alphabetically under subject-headings, and the author's name is appended in each case. Bullen writing in the DNB in 1885 states that had been twice reprinted; first in Park's ponderous Heliconia, 1815, and again, for private circulation, by Collier, 1867.

Allott's other production, Wits Theater, is a collection of moral sayings gathered from classical authors, anecdotes of famous men, historical epitomes, and the like. It contains plenty of curious information, but is hardly less wearisome than Francis Meres's Wit's Treasury.
