= Caleb V. Haynes =

United States Air Force general of World War II

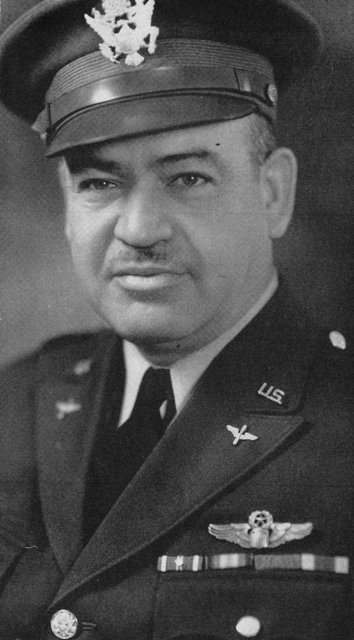
- Born: Caleb Vance Haynes; March 15, 1895; Dobson, North Carolina, US
- Died: April 5, 1966 (aged 71); Carmel, California, US
- Burial place: Arlington National Cemetery
- Military career
- Allegiance: United States
- Branch: United States Army Air Service; United States Army Air Corps; United States Army Air Forces; United States Air Force
- Service years: 1917–1953
- Rank: Major General
- Commands: 116th Observation Squadron, 41st Division Aviation 37th Pursuit Squadron; 37th Attack Squadron; 49th Bombardment Squadron; 41st Reconnaissance Squadron (Long Range); 25th Bombardment Group; Borinquen Field; Assam-Burma-China Ferry Command; Bomber Command of the China Air Task Force; India Air Task Force of the Tenth Air Force; American Air Command Number One; I Bomber Command of First Air Force; III Bomber Command; Newfoundland Base, Atlantic Division of Air Transport Command 3750th Technical Training Wing at Sheppard Air Force Base
- Conflicts: World War I World War II
- Awards: Distinguished Flying Cross (3); Mackay Trophy; Order of the Merit of Chile; Distinguished Service Medal; Air Medal (2); Commendation Medal; Silver Star (2)

Caleb Vance Haynes (March 15, 1895 – April 5, 1966) was a United States Air Force (USAF) major general. The grandson of Chang Bunker, a famous Siamese Twin, he served in the Air Force as an organizer, able to create air units from scratch. He commanded a large number of groups, squadrons and task forces before, during and after World War II.

In the 1930s, Haynes, a rated command pilot, led experimental long-range over-water interception flights that were key to the development of U.S. air defense doctrine. Haynes demonstrated by piloting one of the bombers that intercepted the Italian liner SS Rex that enemy ships could be located and sunk by American aircraft. As well, Haynes helped promote air power by flying long range missions to various countries in South America.

Described as "a big, hulking mountaineer", Haynes was a "pilot's pilot", the kind of air officer who led from the front. Fighting in China in 1942, Haynes commanded a small force of bombers under Claire Chennault, and was known for his expert flying ability and his daring. Chennault said that "Haynes looked like a gorilla and flew like an angel."

== Early life ==
He was born in Dobson, the county seat of Surry County, North Carolina, on March 15, 1895, to Caleb Hill Haynes, Jr. and Margaret Elizabeth "Lizzie" Bunker. The couple produced five daughters and four sons—Caleb Vance Haynes was the fourth child and the second son. At the time of his birth, his father was the Surry County, North Carolina Registrar of Deeds. The father continued to rise in North Carolina Democratic Party politics, serving as one of the delegates to the Democratic National Convention in 1912. A Mason, Caleb Hill Haynes, Jr. was the county sheriff for twenty years following which he was elected to the North Carolina General Assembly in 1931.

On his mother's side, Caleb Vance Haynes had Thai and Chinese ancestors through his grandfather Chang Bunker, one of the original Siamese Twins. The conjoined twins married sisters, with Chang Bunker marrying Adelaide Yates. The couple produced seven daughters and three sons, and lived west of Mount Airy, North Carolina. Three of their Anglo-Chinese offspring, including Lizzie Bunker, Haynes's mother, married into the local Haynes clan.

Young Caleb Vance Haynes grew up and went to school in Mount Airy. He moved some 140 miles (230 km) to the southeast to attend Wake Forest College. There, he graduated in 1917 with a Bachelor of Laws degree.

== World War I ==
Two months after receiving his law degree, Haynes entered the United States Army as a flying cadet on August 15, 1917. From August to November 1917, he attended the School of Military Aeronautics at Georgia Polytechnic Institute, after which he sailed for France. He served at Saint-Maixent-l'École until the following March and then entered the Machine Gun School at Gondrecourt-le-Château. In May 1918, he was commissioned a temporary second lieutenant in the Air Service, and sent to Tours as a test pilot. In July of that year, he became an instructor at the Second Aviation Instructor Center at Issoudun and the following September was transferred to Orly as a test pilot. After the armistice in November 1918, he served as an aide to President Woodrow Wilson during the Paris Peace Conference.

== Inter-war period ==
=== Air Service duty ===
Returning to the U.S. in June 1919, he was assigned to Mitchel Field on Long Island, New York. The following August he went to Speedway, Indiana, for duty as supply officer of the Aviation Repair Depot. In July 1920, he was commissioned a second lieutenant in the Air Service of the Regular Army and in September became a test officer at the Fairfield, Ohio, Air Intermediate Depot. In May 1922, he went to Washington, D.C. where he served as officer-in-charge of gasoline and oil supply systems in the Office of the Chief of Air Service. In 1923, he piloted one of the six Army planes that flew from the U.S. to San Juan, Puerto Rico, on a goodwill tour.

Haynes was ordered to Crissy Field in San Francisco in August 1924, and transferred to Camp Lewis, Washington, the following June where he served three months as commanding officer of the Air Corps detachment. In September 1925, he returned to Crissy Field.

=== Air Corps duty ===
Under Major John T. "Jack" Fancher in March 1927, Haynes became an instructor of the 116th Observation Squadron, the aerial component of the 41st Division of the Washington National Guard, stationed at Felts Field. Haynes was one of the directors of the 1927 Spokane National Air Derby and Air Races, September 21–25, with finish lines established at Felts for air races starting from New York and also from San Francisco. Fancher died in April 1928, and Haynes succeeded him in command of the 116th. Haynes married and became a father during his time in Spokane, and he improved Felts Field, adding a photography laboratory. In August 1931 after four years in Washington state, he entered the Air Corps Tactical School at Maxwell Field in Alabama, at the rank of first lieutenant.

Following graduation from the school in June 1932, he went to Langley Field, Virginia, for duty as engineering officer of the Eighth Pursuit Group, a unit of fighter aircraft at which he attained the rank of captain. In February 1934, he assumed command of the Second Station, Eastern Zone, for the Army Air Corps Mail Operation (AACMO) based at Bolling Field, Washington, D.C.; Haynes was frustrated that his men in Richmond, Virginia were "forced to establish headquarters in rear of hangars, in tents, sheds, and other places" unsuited to winter operations. Haynes urgently requested air temperature thermometers to be supplied to all mail planes so that pilots could be warned of possible atmospheric icing conditions, but was forced to operate without them as procurement was to take two months. From July 1934 until January 1935, Haynes was the commanding officer of the 37th Pursuit Squadron at Langley Field. This turned out to be Haynes's last posting to a fighter unit.

Haynes went to Rockwell Field, California, for special training in air navigation and instrument flying. Returning to Langley field in March 1935, he was appointed commanding officer of the 37th Attack Squadron there. He entered the Command and General Staff School at Fort Leavenworth, Kansas, in August 1935, and graduated the following June. He returned to Langley Field, where he served as commanding officer of the 49th Bombardment Squadron of the 2nd Bombardment Group, and rose to the temporary rank of major.

The first YB-17 Flying Fortress service test aircraft were assigned in March 1937 to the 2nd Bombardment Group, commanded by Lt. Col. Robert Olds. Following Barney M. Giles in the first one, Haynes flew the second one to Langley. By early August, a squadron of 12 were gathered. On August 12–13, 1937, Haynes took part in a joint Army-Navy exercise in which the battleship USS Utah was to be searched for off the coast of San Francisco, and hit with 50-pound (23 kg) water bombs if found. The timing and location had been selected by Admiral William D. Leahy to provide the Utah with the greatest likelihood of fog and cloud cover in which to hide from air observation. The navy supplied the water bombs, but the airmen had never employed them, and were not practiced in their aerodynamics. Delos Carleton Emmons commanded the Air Corps units from his headquarters at Hamilton Field, and Curtis LeMay served as the main navigator for the bomber group, composed of thirty twin-engine Martin B-10s, seven of the new YB-17s, four B-18 Bolos, and three amphibious aircraft. On the afternoon of August 12, the Navy sent to the airmen directions which were off by one degree of latitude, about 50 miles (80 km) to the east of the ship's actual position, and the bombers did not find the battleship. The next morning, Haynes and Olds flew the lead YB-17 with LeMay as navigator, and General Headquarters Air Force commander General Frank M. Andrews as an observer to witness the results. Haynes descended below the fog to find the Utah, and commenced bombing at 11:47 a.m at a low altitude of 600 feet (180 m). At 11:59, the last YB-17 dropped its bombs, for a total of three direct hits out of fifty water bombs dropped. The larger flight of B-10s arrived three minutes after noon, three minutes too late for the exercise.

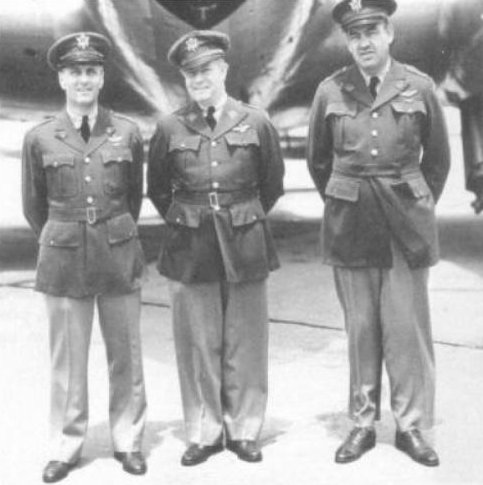
Majors Harold L. George, Vincent L. Meloy and Caleb V. Haynes as goodwill pilots to Bogotá, Colombia

In February 1938, he participated in the Army flight from Langley Field to Buenos Aires, Argentina, commanded by Olds, and in August of that year took part in the Army flight to Bogotá, Colombia. The following January he returned to the Air Corps Tactical School at Maxwell Field to take a month's course in Naval Operations.

=== Interception of the Rex ===
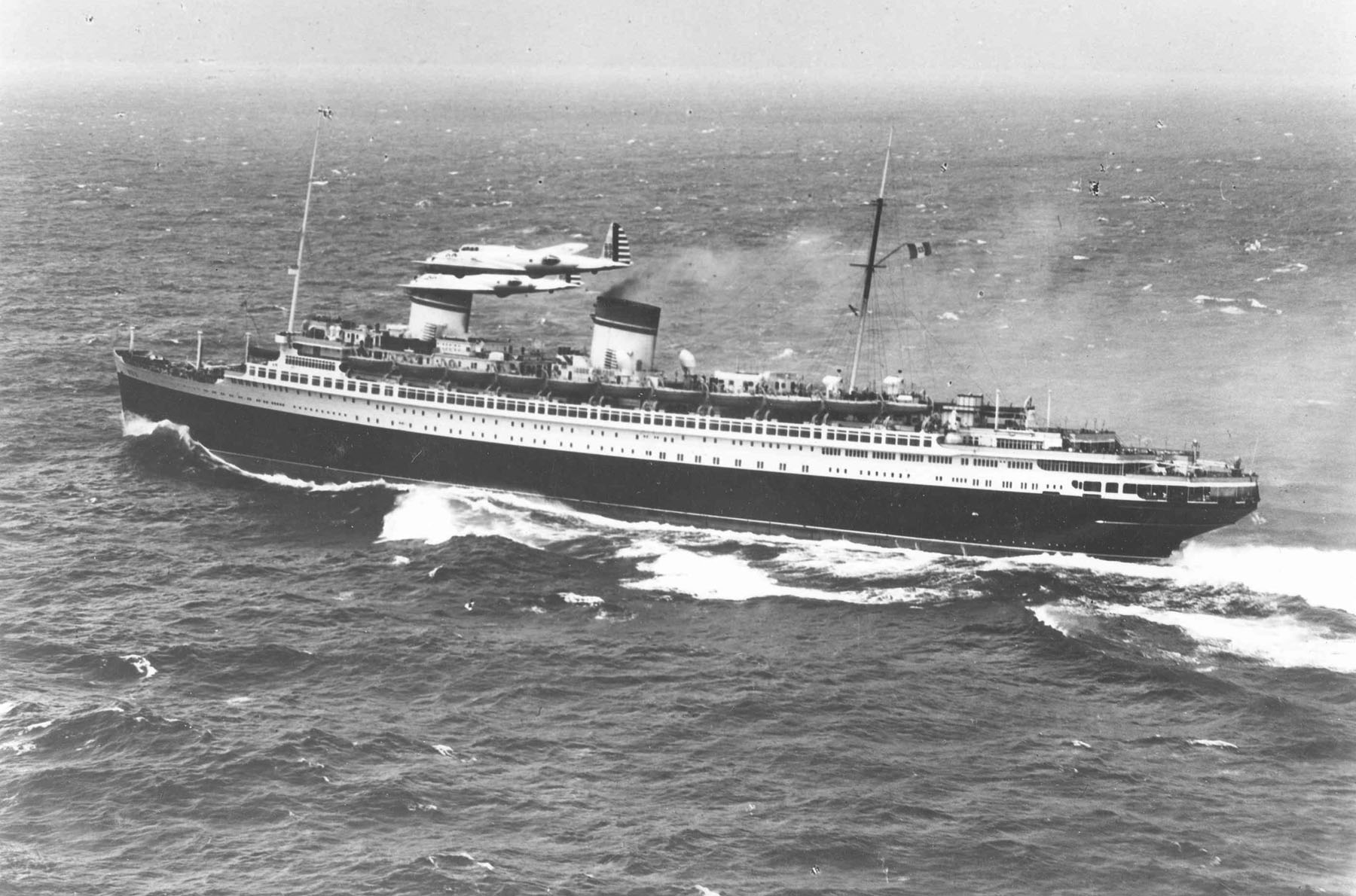
Pilots Haynes and Smith fly over the SS Rex "at smokestack level".

In May 1938 during Army maneuvers, bomber advocates wished to attempt an interception of a ship at sea, as far from land as the B-17's practical range would allow. The U.S. Navy refused to cooperate—instead, Reserve Lieutenant Harris Hull suggested intercepting an ocean liner. The War Department agreed, and arranged for coordination with the Italian ocean liner SS Rex which would be crossing the Atlantic. Lieutenant Colonel Ira C. Eaker, head of Air Corps public relations, contacted major news agencies for national publicity. Haynes flew one of the three B-17s specially prepared for the task. Aboard Haynes's aircraft were LeMay as navigator and the two theoretical war-maneuver adversaries: Major Vincent L. Meloy, another squadron commander acting as the attacking force's commander, and Olds as defending group commander. Positioned further back in the body of the bomber was one NBC radio announcer served by two broadcast engineers operating a powerful radio transmitter and a smaller transceiver tuned to the Rex. On May 12 through poor weather, the morning position report from the Rex placed the ship 725 miles (1,167 km) at sea and the three B-17s took off in a driving rain.

LeMay's expert navigation plot resulted in visual contact with the ship at 12:25 pm some 620 miles (1,000 km) east of Sandy Hook. NBC began broadcasting to the U.S. on the main transmitter, while Meloy spoke over the other radio with Captain Cavellini of the Rex, who jokingly invited all of the airmen down for lunch at his table. Aboard another B-17, USAAC's top photographer, Major George W. Goddard, snapped a shot of Haynes and fellow pilot Archibald Y. Smith flying their two B-17s over the Rex "at smokestack level"—Goddard later enthused that the photo "made the front page of every newspaper around the world".

=== 1938 to Pearl Harbor ===
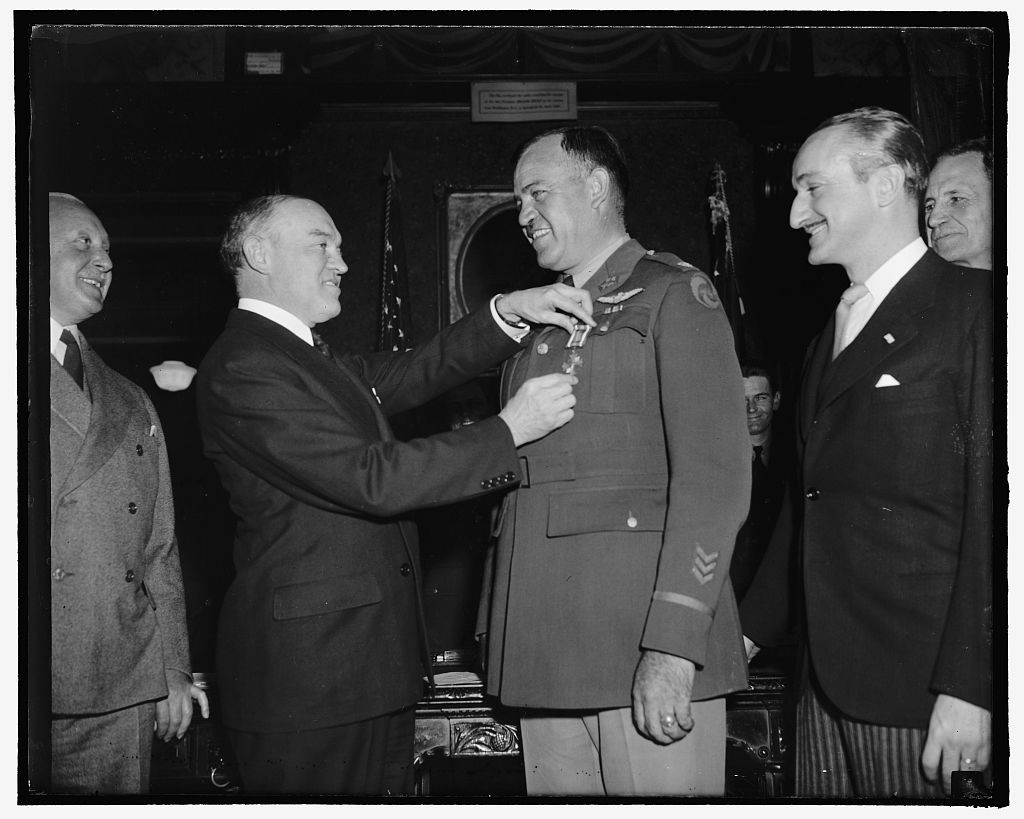
Haynes receiving the Distinguished Flying Cross in 1939

Late in 1938, Haynes commanded a provisional group of nine YB-17s that were to test bombing accuracy over Plum Tree Island, a bombing range near Langley at the mouth of Chesapeake Bay. Carrying two 2,000-pound (910 kg) bombs each, the aircraft flew at 18,000 feet (5,500 m) in single file, and aimed at a single point, dropping their bombs in quick succession. Observation showed exactly half the bombs striking inside of a 1,000-foot (300 m) diameter circle centered on the target.

Haynes received the Distinguished Flying Cross and the Order of the Merit of Chile for his role in February 1939 as commander of the experimental aircraft, the Boeing XB-15, carrying 3,250 pounds (1,470 kg) of American Red Cross emergency supplies to Santiago, Chile, to help the survivors of the 1939 Chillán earthquake. Haynes and his ten-man crew won the Mackay Trophy for their part in the nearly 10,000-mile (16,000 km) round trip voyage. The flight showed the world not only the lengths to which the U.S. could go to mount a humanitarian relief mission but also the range and payload capability of the new bomber.

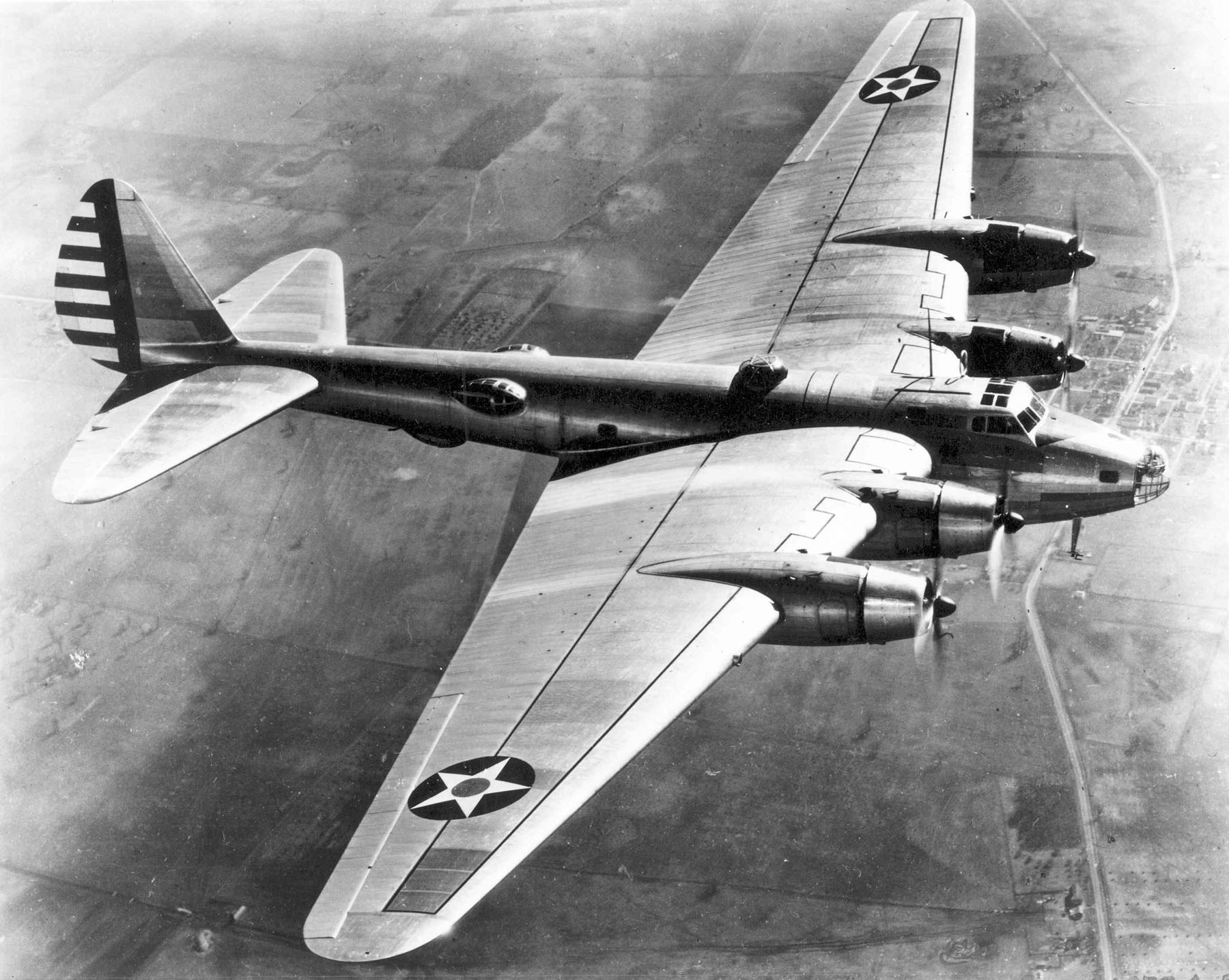
Haynes commanded the Boeing XB-15 on an earthquake relief mission to Chile in 1939.

Haynes piloted the XB-15 again on June 10 to return home the body of Mexican flier Francisco Sarabia who had died in a crash in the Potomac River. After flying back from Mexico City, Haynes and his copilot William D. Old undertook flight tests at Fairfield, Ohio, lifting very heavy loads. They used the XB-15 to lift 22,046 pounds (10,000 kg) to 8,228 feet (2,508 m), and 31,164 pounds (14,136 kg) to 6,561.6 feet (2,000.0 m), setting two world records. Haynes was awarded certificates issued by the National Aeronautics Association (NAA) for an international record for "the greatest payload carried to an altitude of 2,000 metres". The following month he received certificates from the NAA for the establishment of an international 5,000 kilometres (3,100 mi) speed record with a 2,000 kilograms (4,400 lb) payload. The latter performance also established a national closed circuit distance record of 3,129.241 miles (5,036.025 km). He was promoted to the permanent rank of major in November.

In February 1940, he was named commanding officer of the 41st Reconnaissance Squadron (Long Range) flying modified bomber aircraft at Langley Field. From October to December 1940, Haynes was an aide to Brigadier General Arnold N. Krogstad at that station. He then became training adviser of the 13th Composite Wing primarily flying Douglas B-18 Bolos at Borinquen Field, Puerto Rico.

From January 7 to June 1, 1941, Haynes was in command of the original 25th Bombardment Group at Borinquen Field and at that time organized the Puerto Rico Sector of the VI Bomber Command. He was promoted to the temporary rank of lieutenant colonel.

Haynes was called to Washington, D.C. in June to command a single B-24 Liberator to be used to test a northern Atlantic air route to Great Britain. On July 1, 1941, he took off from Bolling Field and refueled in Montreal, then again at Gander Lake, Newfoundland before arriving in Ayr, Scotland in the first B-24 delivered overseas. A total of 22 round trip flights were made by others in the next three-and-a-half months, however, Haynes was directed to scout another air route across the southern Atlantic from the U.S. to Brazil to Africa, with the terminus in Cairo, Egypt. On August 31 with Major Curtis LeMay as his co-pilot and Chief of the Air Corps Major General George H. Brett as a passenger, Haynes took off from Bolling Field to begin a 26,000-mile (42,000 km) round trip journey to Egypt and beyond, conveying Brett to Basra, Iraq, on a special mission. Haynes and LeMay retraced their flight to land back in the U.S. on October 7. With the southern route thus proved satisfactory, the UK agreed to purchase 16 B-24s to be delivered by this method to Cairo—one quarter of that number made the trip before the remainder were redirected into American service.

== World War II ==
In December 1941 at the start of direct involvement of the U.S. in World War II, Haynes was made base commander of Borinquen Field, an important defensive stronghold in the Caribbean and the first refueling stop after Florida in the southern route to Cairo. The following February he returned to Washington, D.C., to organize Force Aquila, the advance party of the Tenth Air Force, an operation that intended to bomb Tokyo using B-17s and B-24s flying from bases in the Zhejiang province of eastern China, supplied by C-47 Skytrains. In Florida, Haynes gathered a force of one B-24, 12 B-17 bombers and a small group of C-47s. Haynes and his mixed unit flew individually to Brazil, then Africa, and on to Karachi, India; landing in April 1942 with no losses. One of the B-17 pilots, Robert Lee Scott, Jr., wrote about his view of the voyage in his autobiography, God Is My Co-Pilot. Haynes began organizing the supply lines for HALPRO, beginning with aviation fuel deliveries to China. On April 9, Colonel William D. Old piloted the first flight over the Hump; Haynes the second. The airmen were chagrined to hear that, with the Doolittle Raid, other Americans had beaten them in being first to attack Tokyo. A further blow came in May 1942 when Japanese forces captured the Chinese bases HALPRO was to use. The project was canceled and its men and B-17s were reassigned by General Lewis H. Brereton to become part of the Tenth Air Force. The HALPRO group of B-24s never reached Karachi; instead, the initial group was diverted to the Ninth Air Force in North Africa.

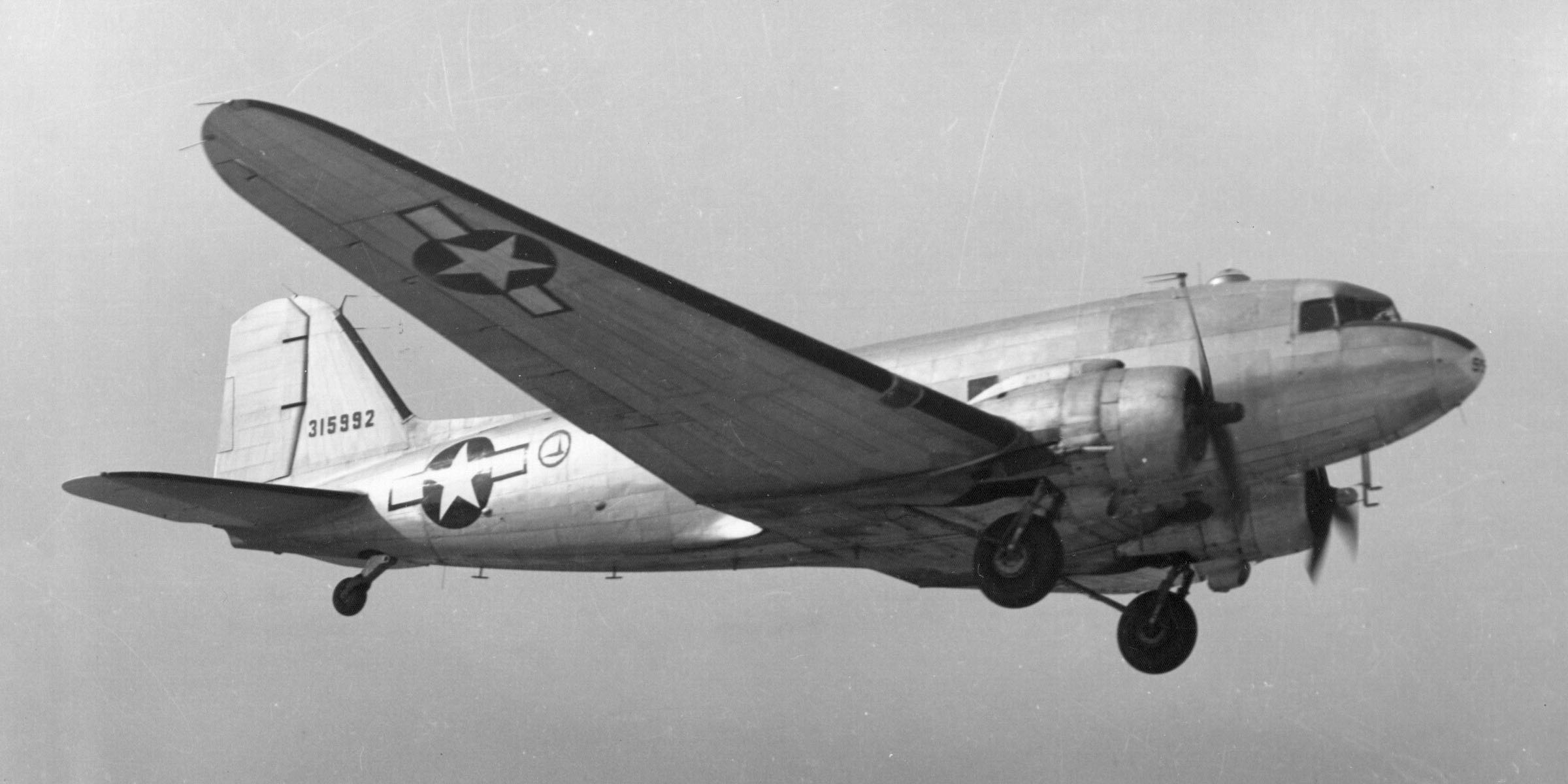
C-47 Skytrain transport

Brereton sent Haynes to Dinjan Airfield in the Indian state of Assam to continue his supply-line work under the name Assam-Burma-China Ferry Command, or ABC Ferry Command, with the mission of supplying American forces in China. This air organization was formed to carry supplies over the Hump, the air route replacement for the enemy-held Burma Road. At first, Haynes worked with only two C-47 transports, and was accompanied on some missions by just one P-40 Warhawk fighter flown by the outfit's executive of operations, Colonel Robert Lee Scott, Jr., who had shifted to flying a fighter once HALPRO was canceled. When Burma appeared to be falling to the Japanese, Haynes and a handful of other airmen of the Chinese National Aviation Corporation and the Royal Air Force flew hundreds of evacuation missions from April to mid-June, bringing some 4,500 passengers westward to safety in India. The American ferry aircraft would typically deliver supplies to China then stop in Burma on the way back to Assam.

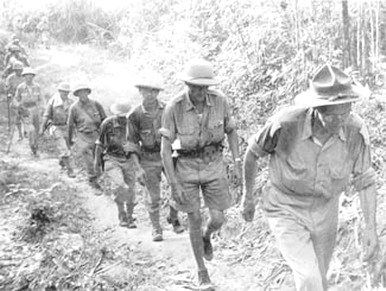
General Joseph Stilwell marching out of Burma

On May 4, 1942, Haynes flew to rescue 30 members of General Joseph Stilwell's mission when they got cut off in Northern Burma, though "Vinegar Joe" himself refused the lift, preferring to walk out with the remainder of his force. Haynes subsequently dropped supplies to Stilwell's group as they made their way west through the jungle. On one such mission, a Japanese fighter attacking his C-47 was discouraged into retreat when the crewmen of the supposedly unarmed transport opened up on it with fire from Thompson submachine guns and 45-caliber M1911 pistols. Around this time Tokyo Rose announced on the radio about Haynes that the Japanese would no longer have anything to worry about because the Americans "made that old broken-down transport pilot commander-in-chief". Haynes, in command of no bombers with which to retaliate, instead loaded a transport with 100-pound (45 kg) fragmentation bombs and had some soldiers throw them out over enemy forces. He returned the next day to drop leaflets which read "Compliments of the Old Broken-Down Transport Pilot". For this action, Haynes was awarded the Silver Star.

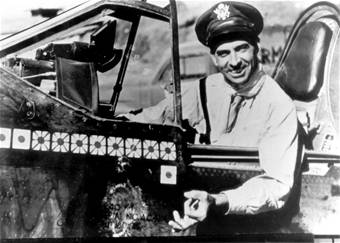
Flying ace Colonel Robert Lee Scott, Jr. led the fighters protecting Haynes's bombers.

In June 1942, Haynes went to China to organize and command the Bomber Command of the China Air Task Force (CATF) under General Claire Chennault. His fighter group counterpart was Scott—the three air leaders were the subject of a Life magazine article in August which described them as like-minded Southerners who "are quietly tough, despise the word can't, eliminate all red tape and allow subordinates full range for individual initiative". Haynes told Jack Belden, the Life journalist, that he "used to like pursuits better but now he likes bombers", and other airmen confirmed to Belden that Haynes handled bombers as easily as fighters. Belden wrote that the open and frank bomber group leader "does not give a damn about playing Army politics". Chennault, Haynes and Scott were said to "form just about the smartest, don't-give-a-damned-est trio Asia has ever seen." Rarely able to send out more than four or five B-25 Mitchell twin-engine bombers at a time, supported by P-40s each carrying another bomb, Haynes constantly shifted his targets and kept the enemy guessing. Fuel and bomb scarcity limited the scope of operations. For instance, the only sortie on July 8 was Haynes piloting a single B-25 to bomb Japanese headquarters in Tengchong, China, near the border of Burma. Claims and losses in July proved the value of the strategy: One B-25 and five P-40s were lost in the destruction of 24 enemy fighters and 12 bombers. Supplies began to increase in the following months.

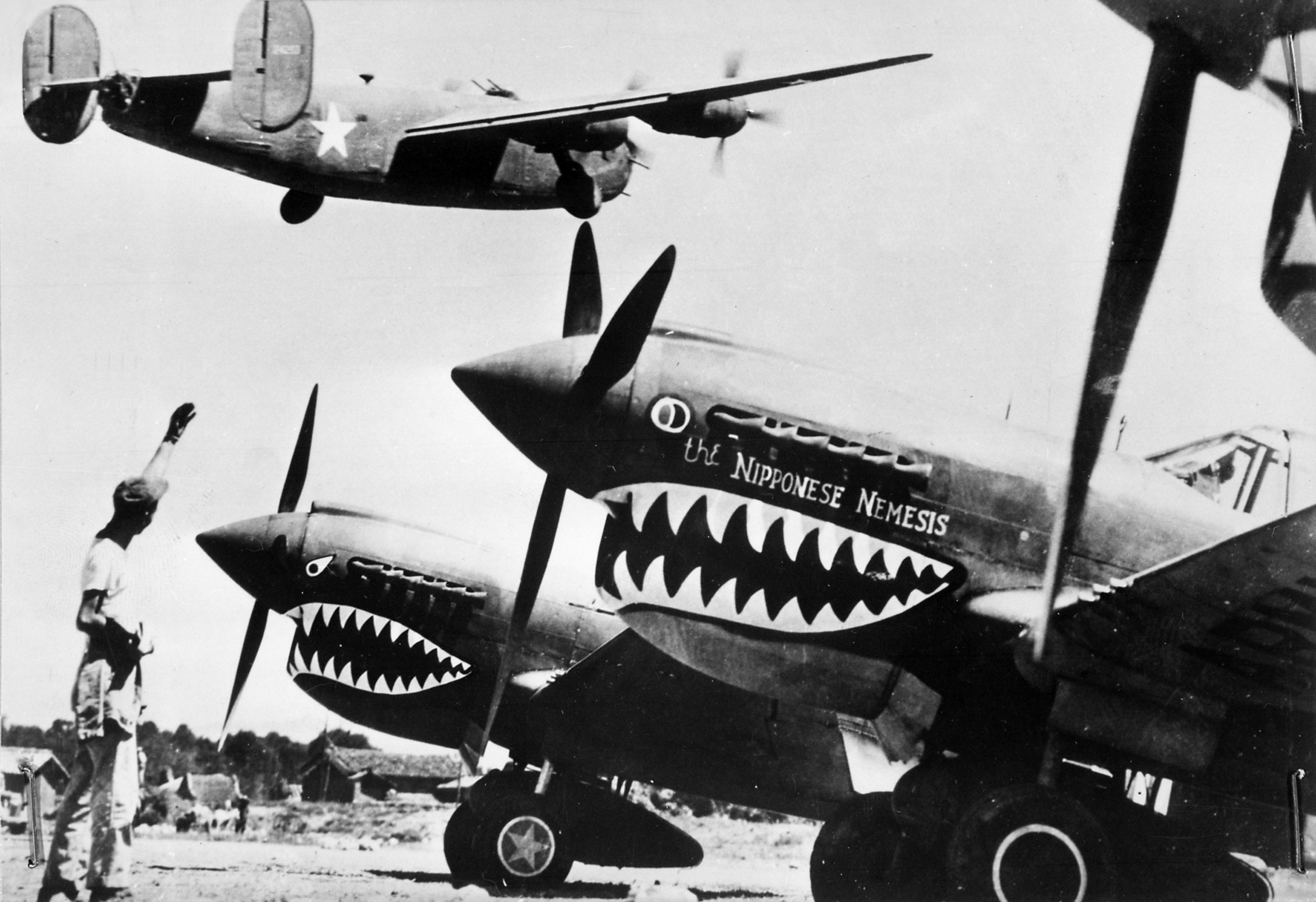
An IATF B-24 Liberator lifts off over P-40 Warhawks at an advance airfield in China.

In October 1942 at the rank of brigadier general, he returned to India where he organized and commanded the India Air Task Force (IATF) of the Tenth Air Force under General Clayton Bissell. In Bissell's re-organization, five commanders reported to him: Haynes ran the IATF, Chennault ran the CATF, Robert F. Tate ran the India–China Ferry Command, Robert C. Oliver ran the Tenth's service arm and Francis M. Brady operated the large air base at Karachi. Haynes's task force assembled three bomber groups: the 7th BG Heavy, the 51st Fighter Group and the 341st BG (Medium). On paper were more squadrons not yet prepared for war—some had no aircraft, some had too little training and some were bare cadres. Haynes used what few aircraft were available, mostly war-weary medium bombers. The bombing missions often included in their payloads some of the "Compliments of" leaflets as a continuation of the defiant response to Tokyo Rose. Men under Haynes noted that the general was never flown by others—he always did his own flying. He emphasized operational preparedness and self-motivation, yet his personal style put people at their ease. Sergeant John Boyd observed that Haynes was "not a desk general but a field and operations commander who believed in getting things done." One of the earliest offensive efforts made by the new task force was a multi-stage 5,500-mile (8,900 km) voyage from the main base at Karachi, through various Chinese airfields with the ultimate goal of attacking the docks of Hong Kong and returning. During this attack, Life journalist Theodore H. White rode in one of the bombers, and wrote a story about the experience for the magazine. On October 25, ten B-25 Mitchells led by Haynes took off on the final leg from an advance airfield at Kunming, accompanied by seven P-40s commanded by Scott. The small force destroyed a transport ship, bombed Hong Kong's vital Kowloon Harbor and claimed 27 enemy aircraft for the loss of one bomber and one fighter. Haynes asked Bissell for more Norden bombsights—the Mitchell mediums shared only two between all the squadrons, and their supplied D-8 bombsights were ones Haynes considered to be of no value.

He sent a small force of eight B-24s to bomb Mandalay on November 8 followed in two days with a repeat visit by six of the heavy bombers. Further B-24 missions continued with slowly increasing numbers of sorties flown. In January 1943, IATF moved to Barrackpore, more than 1,300 miles (2,100 km) nearer its targets in Burma. The combat strength of IATF, though not yet 100%, was strong enough to challenge Japanese air superiority in Burma.

Haynes returned to Assam in June 1943, to organize for Bissell the Assam-American Air Base Command (AAABC) which he led as a mixed force composed primarily of Tenth Air Force units with some elements of the Fourteenth Air Force. Haynes was tasked with coordinating area defense and offensive destruction of the enemy, the emphasis on the former. For the first two months, Haynes was given fewer officers and men than he deemed necessary, and the AAABC made little headway in its mission. In mid-August, large-scale re-organization of Allied forces in Asia resulted in the AAABC being renamed the American Air Base Command 1, and placed under George E. Stratemeyer. Haynes led the group until September 1943, when he returned to the U.S. after 18 months in Asia. Before he left, he told American reporters that his forces had helped deny the port of Rangoon to the enemy, and helped soften Burma for invasion. He stated that the highlight of his time in Asia was the air raid against Hong Kong. After his upcoming air crossing of the Atlantic, his eighth such, Haynes said that the first thing he intended to do was look up his 14-year-old son in high school and his wife who was working in the drafting department at Sperry in Garden City, New York.

In October of that year, he became commanding general of the I Bomber Command of First Air Force at Mitchel Field, flying anti-submarine warfare missions along the Eastern Seaboard. In July 1944, he went to MacDill Field in Florida, where he took over the III Bomber Command, a bomber training group that also hunted for submarines.

== Cold War ==
In December 1945, he was assigned to headquarters of the Atlantic Division of Air Transport Command at Fort Totten, New York, and the following month was appointed commanding general of the Newfoundland Base command at Fort Pepperell, Newfoundland. There, he oversaw operations of American stations in Greenland, northern Quebec, Baffin Island and Labrador. Haynes told a National Geographic reporter that, even though the air stations were remote, "our troops' morale is high".

In July 1949, Haynes became Inspector General, Military Air Transport Service (MATS) at Andrews Air Force Base in Maryland. He was appointed deputy commander for services of MATS two-month later, at the rank of major general. In January 1951, he assumed command of the 3750th Technical Training Wing at Sheppard Air Force Base, Wichita Falls, Texas. Haynes retired in 1953.

== Personal life ==
Haynes married Margery McLeod, born about 1899 in California, and the couple had a child, Caleb Vance Haynes, Jr., born in Spokane, Washington in 1928. The son, known as Vance Haynes, served in the USAF 1951–1954 in special weapons, then studied archaeology and geology, earning a doctorate from the University of Arizona in 1965. He became a professor of archaeology at universities in Texas and Arizona, and through his excavation work at Sandia Cave, helped establish the timeline of human migration through North America.

Haynes and his wife toured the American West after his retirement, indulging themselves while searching for a permanent residence. Some of the general's friends suggested Wichita Falls, the city of his last military post, but he left to assess the possibility of living in Taos, New Mexico, where he and his airman son hiked and explored ancient human settlements. Deciding against Taos, Haynes and his wife continued in their tour, soon finding Carmel-by-the-Sea, California, to their liking. There, he bought two adjoining lots on North Carmelo Street with one existing house. Rather than accepting any of the offers he received promising an executive career in the aeronautics industry, he relaxed by hunting and fishing.

Haynes joined a number of men's clubs. He was a Freemason in the Granite Lodge of Mount Airy, a holder of the 32nd degree in the Ancient and Accepted Scottish Rite, and a Shriner. He was a member of the Quiet Birdmen, a secretive fraternal order of pilots, and he joined the American Legion. He enjoyed visits by friends, especially playing cards and sipping bourbon with his former military colleagues. He died at his home during the night of April 4–5, 1966, of acute peritonitis flaring up from a chronic duodenal ulcer. He was buried with full military honors at Arlington National Cemetery on April 8.

== Awards and decorations ==
Among Caleb V. Haynes military decorations were the following:

Badge	Command Pilot Badge		
1st Row	Distinguished Service Medal		
2nd Row	Silver Star with one bronze oak leaf cluster	Legion of Merit	Distinguished Flying Cross with two bronze oak leaf clusters
3rd Row	Air Medal with one bronze oak leaf cluster	World War I Victory Medal	Army Commendation Medal
4th Row	Armed Forces Expeditionary Medal	American Defense Service Medal	American Campaign Medal
5th Row	Asiatic-Pacific Campaign Medal	World War II Victory Medal	National Defense Service Medal

- Mackay Trophy
- Order of the Merit of Chile

== Effective dates of promotion ==
- Private, First Class, Aviation Section, Signal Corps – August 15, 1917
- Second lieutenant (temporary), Air Service – May 31, 1918
- Second lieutenant – June 1920
- First lieutenant – July 1, 1920
- Captain – October 14, 1932
- Major (temporary) – August 27, 1936
- Major – November 1, 1939
- Lieutenant colonel (temporary) – March 21, 1941
- Colonel (temporary) – January 5, 1942
- Lieutenant colonel – March 4, 1942
- Brigadier general – September 5, 1942
- Major general – September 1949
