= Oldys =

Oldys is a surname. Notable people with the surname include:

- Henry Oldys (1859–1925), American ornithologist, father of Robert Olds
- Robert Olds (1896–1943), American officer and military theorist born Robert Oldys, son of Henry Oldys and father of Robin Olds
- Robin Olds (1922–2007), American pilot and officer born Robert Oldys Jr., son of Robin Olds
- William Oldys (1696–1761), English antiquarian and bibliographer

== See also ==
- Oldies
