= Christopher Middleton (d. 1628) =

English poet and translator

Christopher Middleton (1560? – 1628) was an English poet and translator.

== Life ==
The Dictionary of National Biography gives tentative information. He may be identical with the Christopher Middleton of Cheshire who matriculated from Brasenose College, Oxford, 12 December 1580, aged 20. A clergyman of the same name, who graduated B.D. from St. John's College, Cambridge, in 1619, was rector of Aston-le-Walls, Northamptonshire, from 1612 till his death there in 1628.

== Works ==
Middleton was the author of:

- A Short Introduction for to Learn to Swimme, gathered out of Master Digbies Booke of the Art of Swimming, and translated into English for the better instruction of those who understand not the Latin tongue, by Christopher Middleton, 1595, 4to. This was illustrated with woodcuts of persons swimming, and was a translation of the De Arte Natandi libri duo, 1587, of Everard Digby.
- The Historie of Heaven: containing the Poetical Fictions of all the Starres in the Firmament, gathered from amongst all the Poets and Astronomers, by Chrystopher Middleton. Printed for him 1596.
- The Famous Historie of Chinon of England, with his Strange Adventures for the love of Celestina, daughter to Lewis, King of France; with the worthy Atchivement of Sir Lancelot du Lake, and Sir Tristram du Lions for faire Laura, daughter to Cadar, Earle of Cornewall, being all Knights of King Arthur's Round Table. By Chr. Middleton. At London, printed by John Danter for Cuthbert Burbie, 1597.
- The Legend of Humphrey, Duke of Glocester, by Chr. Middleton. London, printed by E. A. for Nicholas Ling, 1600. The author dedicates this poem to Sir Jarvis Clifton. It is preceded by a Latin hexastichon by Robert Allott, a sonnet by Michael Drayton, and two short poems by John Weever. The poem, consisting of 184 six-line stanzas, is written on the plan of the poems in the Mirror for Magistrates.

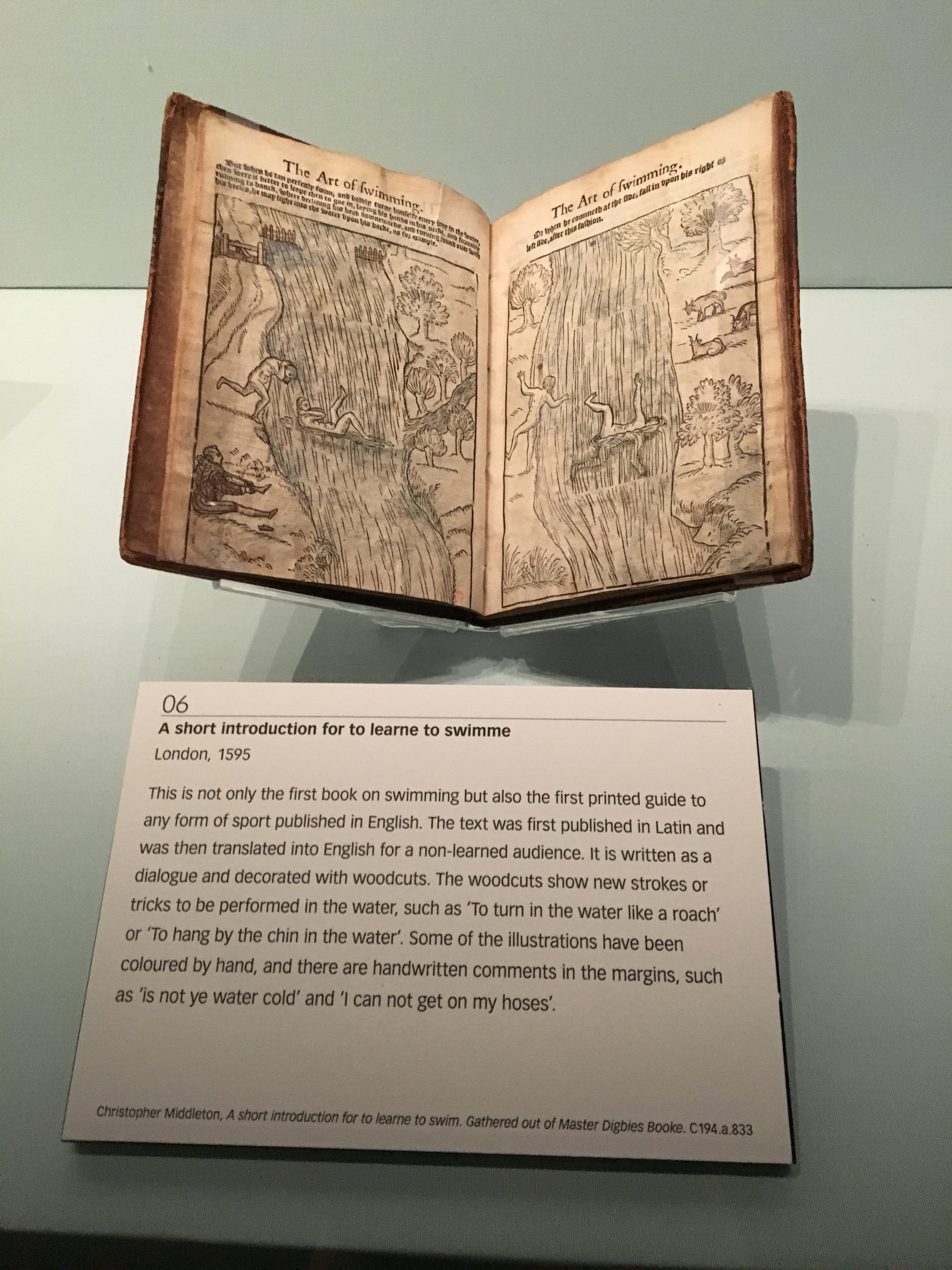
The book "A short introduction for to learne to swimme" - British Library
