= Everard Digby (scholar) =

Everard Digby (born c. 1549/1550-c.1592) was an English academic theologian, expelled as a Fellow of St John's College, Cambridge for reasons that were largely religious. He is known as the author of a 1587 book, written in Latin, that was the first work published in England on swimming; and also as a philosophical teacher, writer and controversialist. The swimming book, De Arte Natandi, was a practical treatise following a trend begun by the archery book Toxophilus of Roger Ascham, of Digby's own college.

According to Eugene D. Hill, in Digby's Theoria Analytica of 1579,

his intuition of many 'mysteries' in Aristotle's Posterior Analytics leads him to develop a theory which conflates technical logic with a vast mass of Neoplatonic and Cabalistic lore taken (not always with acknowledgement) from Ficino's translation of Plotinus and from the Cabalistic dialogues of Johannes Reuchlin.

== Life ==
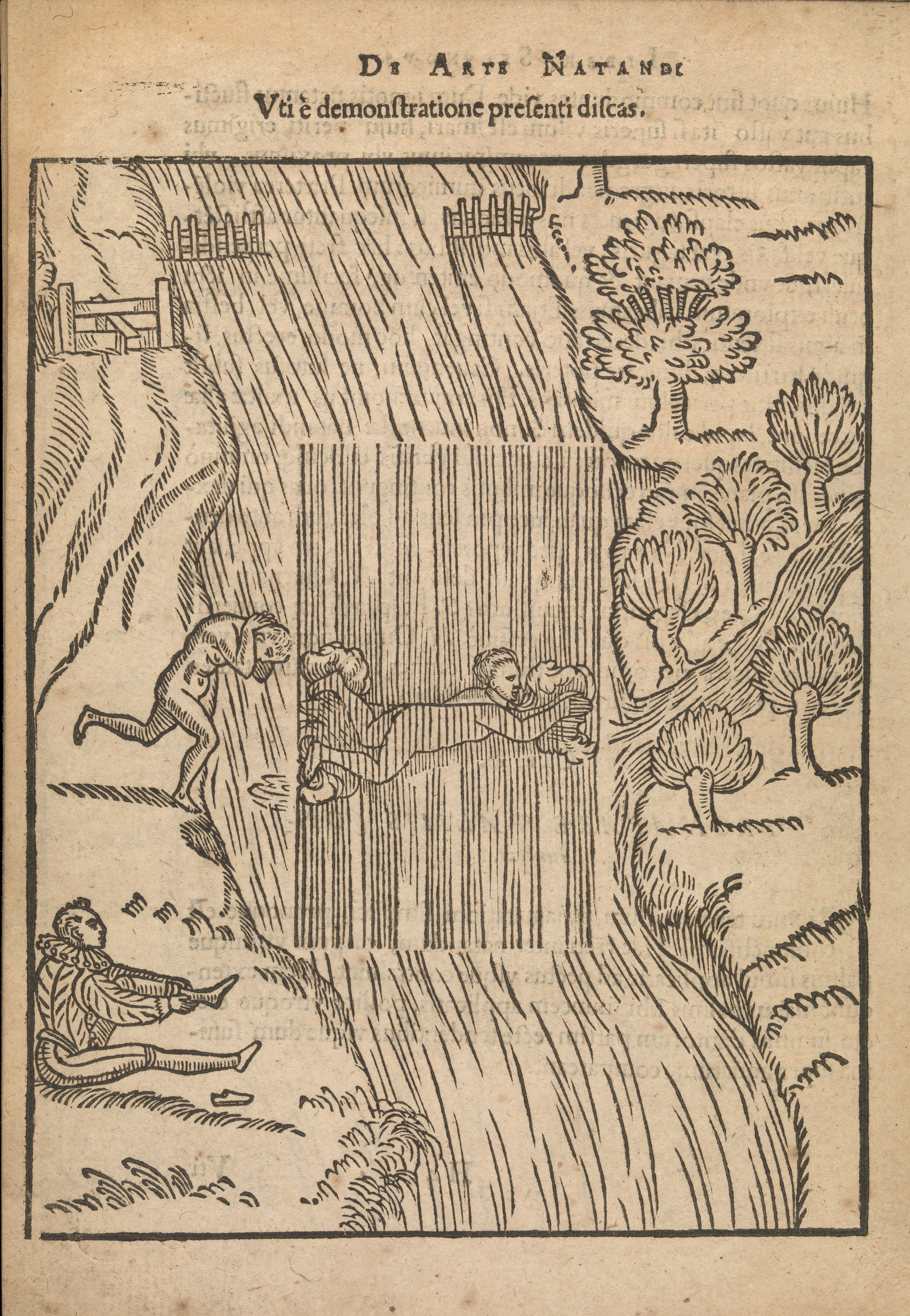
Illustration from De arte natandi

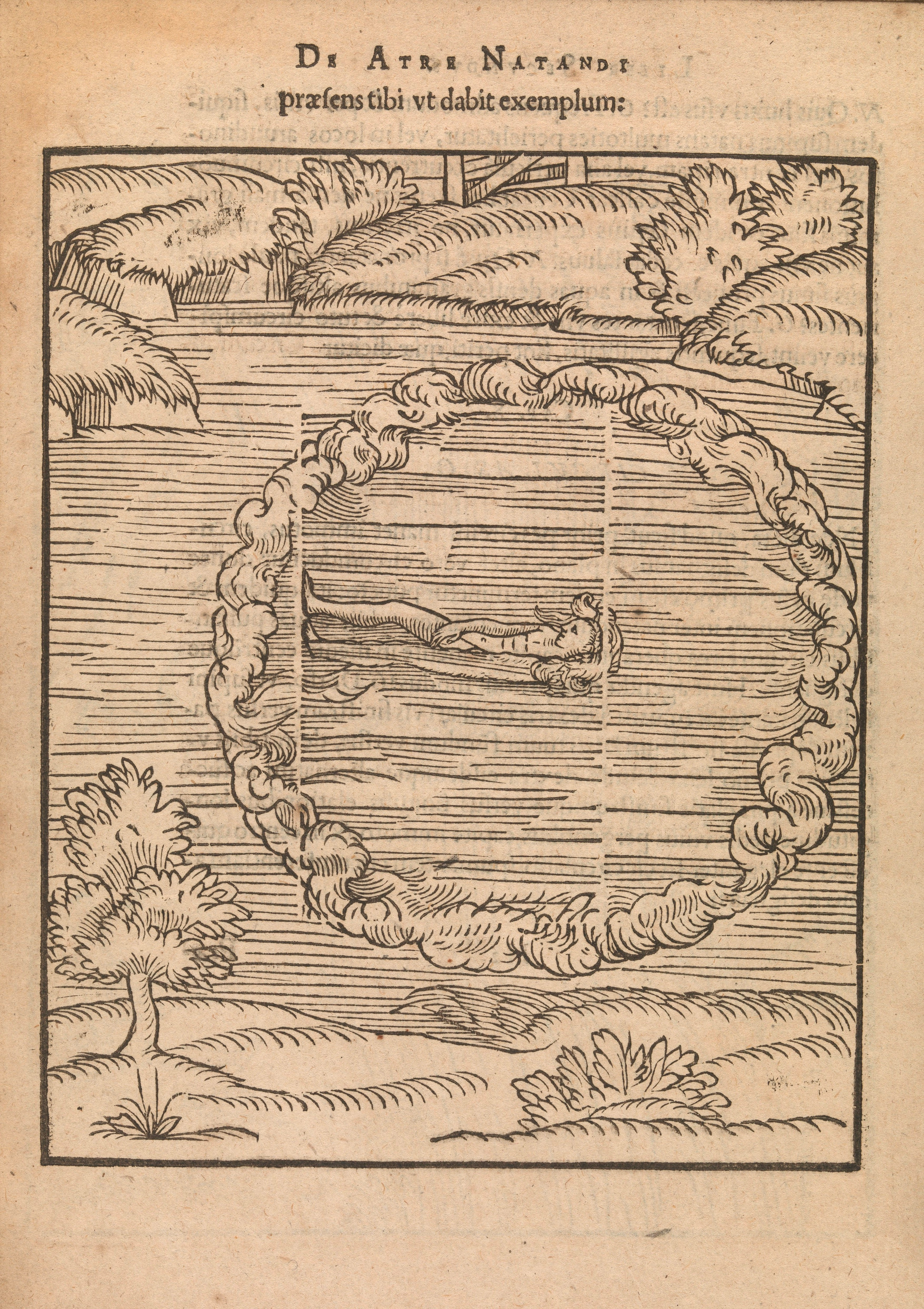
Illustration from De arte natandi

Born about 1550, he matriculated as a sizar of St John's College, Cambridge, 25 October 1567; was admitted a scholar 9 November 1570; proceeded B. A. 1570–1, M.A. 1574, and B.D. 1581; and became a Lady Margaret fellow on 12 March 1572–3, and senior fellow 10 July 1585. He was principal lecturer in 1584. Digby took part in the college performance of Thomas Legge's Richardus Tertius in 1580.

Before the end of 1587 he was deprived of his fellowship. In a letter to chancellor of the university Lord Burghley, William Whitaker, master of St John's College (4 April 1588), explained that this step had been rendered necessary by Digby's arrears with the college steward. He added that Digby had preached voluntary poverty, a 'popish position,' at St Mary's; had attacked Calvinists as schismatics; was in the habit of blowing a horn and hallooing in the college during the daytime, and repeatedly spoke of the master to the scholars with the greatest disrespect. Burghley and John Whitgift ordered Digby's restitution; but Whitaker stood firm, and with the support of the Earl of Leicester obtained confirmation of the expulsion.

He was appointed Vicar of Hamstall Ridware, Staffordshire in 1590 and probably died about 1592.

== Writings and controversy ==
Digby's best known book is a treatise on swimming, the earliest published in England. De Arte Natandi is illustrated with plates, and was translated into English by Christopher Middleton in 1595 as A Short Introduction for to Learne to Swimme. This biomechanics of swimming is considered the best swimming book for over 300 years. It deals with the specific weight of objects and humans.

Digby also wrote a work against Ramism and his own system, Theoria analytica, dedicated to Sir Christopher Hatton, 1579. William Temple of King's College, Cambridge, wrote, under the pseudonym of Franciscus Mildapettus, an attack on Digby's criticism of Petrus Ramus, to which Digby replied in 1580. Temple replied again in 1581.

As the productions of a predecessor of Francis Bacon, Digby's two philosophical books are notable, although clumsy in expression and overlaid with scholastic subtleties. Digby tried in his Theoria Analytica to classify the sciences, and elsewhere ventures on a theory of perception based on the notion of the active correspondence of mind and matter. Otherwise Digby is a disciple of Aristotle.

Digby was also author of Everard Digbie, his Dissuasive from taking away the Lyvings and Goods of the Church, with Celsus of Verona, his Dissuasive, translated into English, London, 1589, dedicated to Sir Christopher Hatton.
