= Interception of the Rex =

1930s United States Army exercise

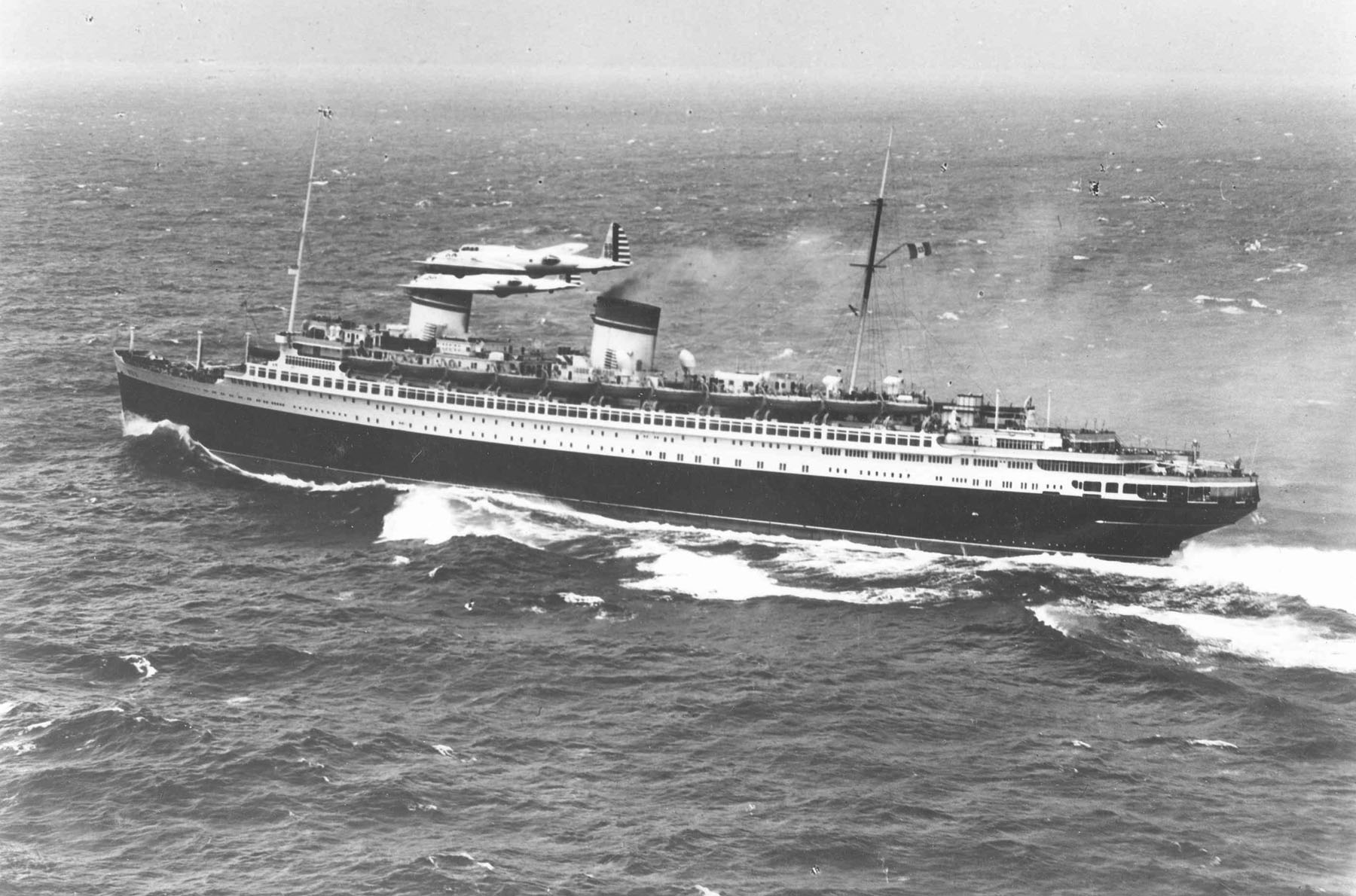
- Three B-17 bombers intercepted the Italian liner SS Rex 620 nm from New York (1938)
Date	12 May 1938
Location	620 nautical miles (713 miles or 1,148 km) east of Sandy Hook, New Jersey
Result	Long-range bombers successfully located and intercepted a ship far out at sea

The interception of the Italian liner SS Rex was a training exercise and military aviation achievement of the United States Army Air Corps prior to World War II. The tracking and location of an ocean-going vessel by B-17 Flying Fortresses on 12 May 1938 was a major event in the development of a doctrine that led to a United States Air Force independent of the Army. The mission was ostensibly a training exercise for coastal defense of the United States, but was conceived by planners to be a well-publicized demonstration of the capabilities of "heavy bombers (as) long range instruments of power".

The flight was conducted during coastal defense maneuvers held by the Air Corps without the participation of the United States Navy, and apparently without understanding of their purpose by the Army Chief of Staff. Both had continuing disagreements with the leaders of the Air Corps over roles and missions, with the Navy disputing its maritime mission and the Army seeking to limit its role to that of supporting ground forces.

With a characteristic flair for creating publicity, the Air Corps' General Headquarters Air Force (its combat organization) not only successfully made the interception at sea, but exploited both live radio news coverage and dramatic photographs. Although the publicity resulted in a short-term setback for Air Corps ambitions, within a year both U.S. President Franklin D. Roosevelt and future Army Chief of Staff George C. Marshall became new proponents of long-range air power. (Note: Roosevelt was especially impressed by the range of the B-17. (Underwood 146))

== Background ==
=== Ostfriesland ===
In July 1921, promoting the concept of an independent Air Force, General Billy Mitchell staged a series of aerial bombing exercises that resulted in the sinking of the former German battleship Ostfriesland by the U.S. Air Service. Incurring the enmity of the Navy, which considered the achievement nothing more than a publicity stunt, Mitchell continued to discredit the battleship as the main weapon for projection of power by sinking several more obsolete ships in the next two years. (Note: The others were the obsolete U.S. pre-dreadnought battleships Alabama in September 1921, and Virginia and New Jersey in September 1923.) However, the Air Service was limited by Army policy to being an auxiliary of the ground forces and was unable to obtain a role that would use long distance bombers.

=== The "Shasta Disaster" ===
When the Air Service was renamed the Air Corps in 1926, the joint Army-Navy Board was in the process of reconsidering service responsibilities in coastal defense. Both Chief of Air Corps Major General Mason Patrick and Rear Admiral William A. Moffett, Chief of the Navy's Bureau of Aeronautics, resisted any restrictions on range or missions for their respective services' aircraft. The resulting joint action statement was vague regarding Air Corps actions over water but "left the door open" for the Navy's interpretation of its own authority, which was that the shore-based coastal patrol mission was its prerogative. Efforts by the War Department to clarify the issue were rebuffed by the Navy to the extent that the secretary of war warned President Herbert Hoover in 1930 that the situation was endangering national defense.

On 7 January 1931, Army Chief of Staff General Douglas MacArthur and Navy CNO Admiral William V. Pratt, reached an agreement modifying the joint action statement by assigning the coastal defense role for land-based aircraft to the Air Corps. This came at a time when the Air Corps was seeking a mission to justify the development of all-metal monoplane bombers, and theorists at the Air Corps Tactical School were advocating the use of long-range heavy bombers. In August of that year, to garner publicity and generate favorable public opinion, Lieutenant Colonel Frank M. Andrews, on the staff of outgoing Chief of the Air Corps, Major General James Fechet, proposed to bomb another ship during joint maneuvers with the Navy off the coast of North Carolina. Before the mission Colonel Roy Kirtland, the base commander at Langley Field, cautioned reporters that the operation was to be only a bombing exercise using small bombs, and that "nothing spectacular" should be expected.

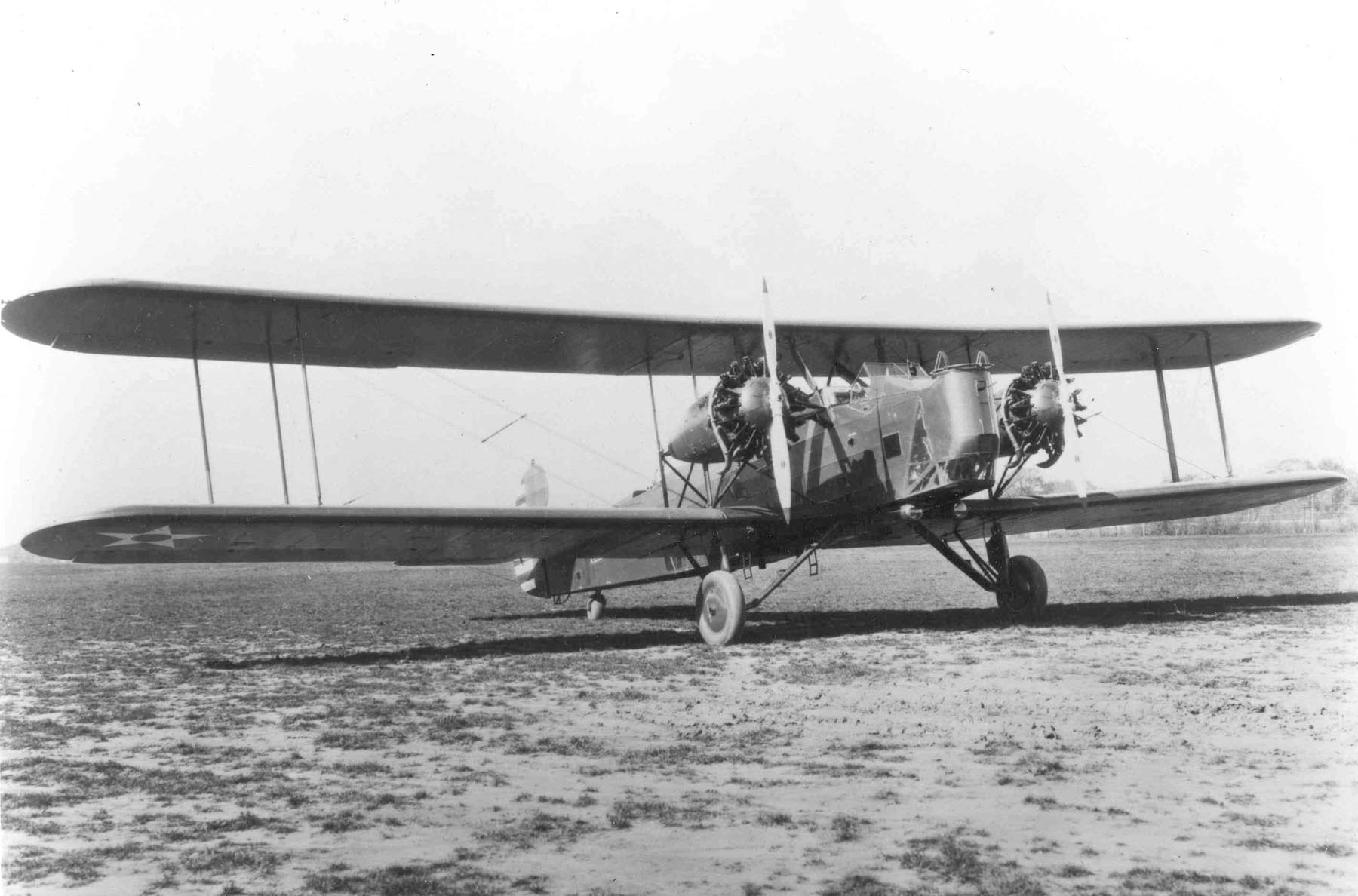
Keystone B-3A

The United States Shipping Board made available a World War I cargo ship, the 4,865 gross ton USS Mount Shasta, that had been tied up in the James River for a decade. An Army minelayer towed the hulk to sea 60 nautical miles (111 km) off Currituck Beach Light. The next morning, 11 August, Major Harbert A. Dargue led nine B-3A and B-5 bombers of the 2nd Bombardment Group, little different from the Martin NBS-1s that had destroyed the Ostfriesland, to locate and attack the Mount Shasta, but a combination of bad weather and failed communications resulted in the planes being unable to locate the ship. Further, the failure was witnessed by several dozen reporters, movie newsreel crews, a broadcast team from NBC radio, and observers from both the Army and Navy, some aboard airplanes that did find the ship. The Navy responded immediately with scornful public mocking of the effort. When a second attempt three days later scored only a few hits with inadequately small 300- and 600-pound bombs, and failed to sink the Mount Shasta, a pair of United States Coast Guard ocean-going tugboats used small guns to sink it.

Despite its earlier disclaimer and subsequent explanations, the Air Corps was highly embarrassed by the incident, referred to as "the bombing flop" within the service. Navy Captain Dudley Knox dubbed it "the Shasta Disaster", and the New York Evening Post commented that "the Navy evened up an old score". Hanson W. Baldwin, military editor of The New York Times and a Naval Academy graduate, averred that it was "illustrative of the inefficiency of land-based pilots over water". As a result, Andrews and six subordinates were replaced by incoming Chief of the Air Corps, Major General Benjamin Foulois, and the secretary of war recommended that the Air Corps' budget be slashed. Andrews and Lieutenant Colonel Henry H. Arnold (executive officer of the Air Materiel Division at Wright Field), however, expressed concerns about the apparent lack of capability and possible failures in Air Corps training demonstrated by the fiasco.

Two months later a second opportunity presented itself. Another old ship, the Haines, sank in shallow water while being towed off Plum Tree Island in Chesapeake Bay and became a hazard to navigation. The 2nd Bombardment Group redeemed itself by completely destroying the derelict from the air, even though their only visible target was a ten-foot-square float marker. This accomplishment, however, went entirely unpublicized.

Regardless of the MacArthur–Pratt agreement, the Navy had gone ahead with development of land-based patrol aircraft and expansion of its naval air stations, and in 1933 formally repudiated the agreement after Pratt retired. On 11 September 1935, the joint board, at the behest of the Navy and the concurrence of MacArthur, issued a revised joint action statement that reasserted the limited role of all Air Corps missions, including coastal defense, as auxiliary to the "mobile Army". However, long-range bomber advocates interpreted its language to mean that the Air Corps could conduct long-range reconnaissance, attack approaching fleets, reinforce distant bases, and attack enemy air bases, all in furtherance of its mission to prevent an air attack on America.

=== Joint Air Exercise No. 4 ===
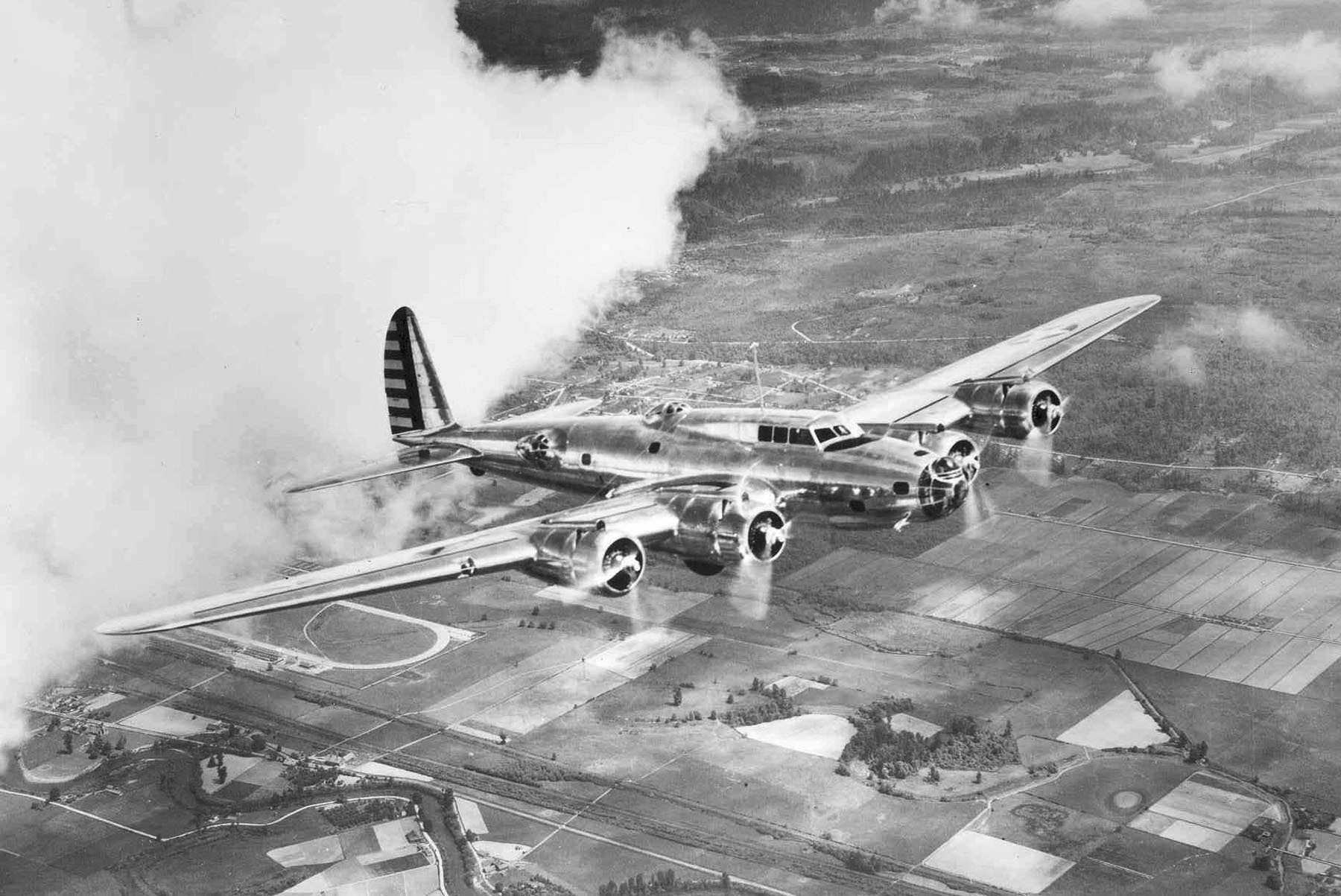
A Boeing YB-17. By the time of the interception, the bombers were redesignated B-17s.

On 4 March 1937, the 2nd Bombardment Group, now commanded by Lieutenant Colonel Robert Olds, received the first of the newly developed B-17 Flying Fortress heavy bombers, with 12 delivered during the spring and summer of 1937. Designated the YB-17 because of its service-test status, the Flying Fortress was the first multi-engine long-range bomber acquired by the Air Corps, despite resistance from the Army General Staff over its necessity, and the centerpiece of the General Headquarters Air Force (GHQ Air Force).

The B-17s made their first significant operational contribution during Joint Air Exercise No. 4, an Army–Navy summer maneuver conducted at sea, west of San Francisco, California. Authorized by a directive of President Roosevelt issued 10 July 1937, the exercise used the target ship Utah to represent a hostile fleet of two battleships, an aircraft carrier, and nine destroyers. A patrol wing of 30 Navy planes commanded by Rear Admiral Ernest J. King was assigned to locate the fleet, after which a force of 41 Air Corps bombers (including seven B-17s operating from March Field) would attack it. War Department orders limited the Air Corps aircraft to operating no more than 300 nautical miles (560 km) offshore, even though the directive had specified an exercise area out to 500 nautical miles (930 km).

The exercise began at noon on 12 August 1937 and was scheduled to end in 24 hours. After several hours of searching through a foggy undercast that extended 200 nautical miles (370 km) offshore, Navy planes found the Utah 275 nautical miles (510 km) from the coast and tracked it heading northwest. Air Corps bombers were sent to attack the ship but searched well into the evening without locating it. Admiral King then found an error in the Navy's position reports, which he later attributed to "clerical error". (Note: Underwood (1991), p. 92, however, states that the Navy "deceived" the Air Corps.) The Utah had actually been 50 nautical miles (93 km) west of the search area provided to the Air Corps. Furthermore, the ship disappeared into the extensive low fog during the night, breaking the contact by the Navy's scout planes. The poor weather also prevented an early morning search for the Utah.

Brigadier General Delos Emmons, commander of the GHQ Air Force's 1st Wing, dispatched bombers at 09:00 on 13 August to search an area of 30,000 square miles (78,000 km^{2}) entirely covered by low clouds. Olds surmised that the Utah had feinted towards San Francisco, then reversed course to attack the industrial Los Angeles area. Accompanied by Major General Frank Andrews (commanding the GHQ Air Force), he flew in the lead B-17 above the clouds, patrolling an area 200 nautical miles (370 km) offshore. A Navy patrol aircraft located the Utah at 11:00 steaming southeast 285 nautical miles (530 km) off the coast. The 2nd BG bombers responded to the position report and located the Utah shortly before the noon termination of the exercise. From an altitude of 400 feet they attacked the former battleship with Navy-supplied water bombs.

When the Navy protested the low-altitude attack, claiming that evasive action could have avoided the attack, both B-17s and B-18s repeated the mission the next day. They found the Utah and bombed it, with the B-17s bombing from 18,000 feet. The Air Corps produced photographs and bombing data that showed it achieved a higher percentage of hits and near-misses than earlier Navy tests, and the Navy subsequently had the exercise classified "Secret". The joint report sent to the president by the secretaries of the Navy and War omitted the information showing the success both in navigation and bombing. Despite the secrecy restriction, the success of the B-17s was leaked to radio commentator Boake Carter, who disclosed it to the public.

In an attempt to overcome this compartmentalization, Andrews bypassed the chain of command on 8 January 1938, in a memorandum of his own regarding a minor joint air exercise held in November 1937 off the Virginia Capes. There four B-17s had found and successfully bombed Navy target vessels. Andrews sent a memo directly to Roosevelt's military aide, Colonel Edwin M. Watson, that included confidential Navy memoranda confirming the accuracy of the Army's bombing.

== Intercepting the Rex ==
=== Northeast Maneuvers ===
In May 1938 the Air Corps conducted one of the largest maneuvers in its history. (Note: Copp, p. 14, called it "the largest". All three wing headquarters, seven group headquarters, and nine complete squadrons participated. The largest previous assemblage was that of the "1st Provisional Air Division" at Wright Field in May 1931, where 667 aircraft, participants from every squadron but one based in the continental United States, and flights from all 19 National Guard observation squadrons gathered, but only 1,440 personnel. (Air Corps News Letter 5 June 1931, Vol. XV No. 7, pp. 190-195)) 468 officers, 2,380 enlisted men, and 131 aircraft were drawn from all three wings of the GHQ Air Force and based at 18 airports in the northeast United States, "from Schenectady, New York, and Aberdeen, Maryland, westward to Harrisburg, Pennsylvania". Included were eight B-17s of the 2nd Bombardment Group. (Note: All personnel, aircraft, and unit statistics for the Northeast Maneuvers were specified in an announcement in the Air Corps News Letter (1 May 1938) Vol. XXI No. 9, p. 11. The 131 aircraft, in addition to the B-17s, were: 44 A-17 and 12 A-18 attack planes, 34 B-18 bombers, 15 PB-2 and P-26 pursuit planes, 2 C-36 transports, and an OA-8 amphibian. Also, the ACNL referred to the 2nd Group's bombers as "B-17", and this article follows suit.) All were assigned as the "Blue Force" defending New England from the "Black Force", an attacking aircraft carrier fleet. The Navy, involved in fleet exercises off the West Coast, did not provide ships to play the role of the Black Force. The Army publicized the resulting scenario as depicting simultaneous attacks on America by hostile fleets on both coasts, with the Air Corps tasked to defend against one of them.

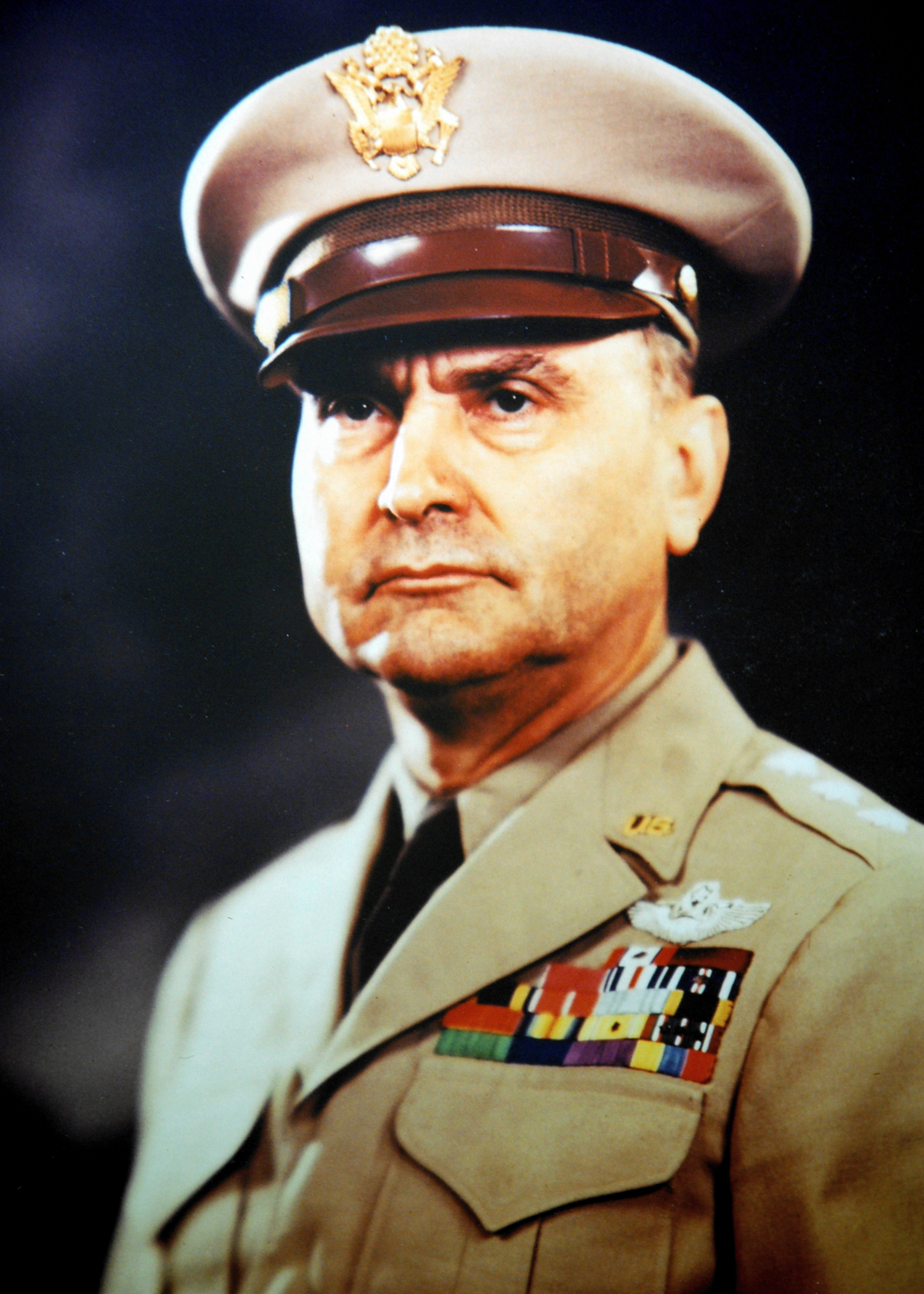
Ira C. Eaker

Attached to the exercise was Lieutenant Colonel Ira C. Eaker, the Chief of the Air Corps' Information Division. (Note: In 1938 "Information" was a term for Military Intelligence, not public relations.) Eaker, who had a degree in journalism and had just completed a course in news photography at the University of Oklahoma, used the maneuvers as a platform for publicizing both the capabilities and materiel deficiencies of the Air Corps. His assistant was 2nd Lieutenant Harris Hull, a reservist on temporary duty for the exercise who was a reporter for the Washington Post in civilian life. When newspapers, including the Los Angeles Times, criticized the maneuvers for using a "mythical fleet" as a target, Hull suggested that an ocean liner be substituted for naval vessels. He learned that the Italian Line's SS Rex was bound for New York and would pass the 1,000 nautical miles (1,900 km) mark on 11 May. Eaker recommended the interception of the liner to General Andrews, who concurred and received approval from the office of the Army's chief of staff. Hull arranged to receive position reports from officials of the line.

Olds, whose B-17s were deployed to Olmsted Field in Harrisburg, was given the assignment of locating the Rex as far at sea as possible, and assigned Major Vincent J. Meloy, the commanding officer of the 20th Bomb Squadron, to act as nominal head of the Black Force. Olds selected three aircraft from the 49th Bomb Squadron for the mission. On the afternoon of 11 May 1937, Olds and his crews flew from Olmsted to the staging base at Mitchel Field on Long Island.

Assigned as lead navigator was 1st Lieutenant Curtis E. LeMay, who had navigated the finding of the Utah and been a participant in a goodwill mission to South America in February that had won the group the MacKay Trophy. The chief of the Materiel Division's Photographic Section, Major George W. Goddard, flew co-pilot in aircraft No. 81 to document the mission using a specially-modified Graflex camera. Reporters were also invited to accompany the mission. They included Hanson Baldwin, possibly because of his earlier excoriation of the "Shasta Disaster", and a radio crew from the National Broadcasting Company (which on 4 April 1937, had made a live six-minute broadcast from a B-17 at Langley Field) to broadcast from aboard the lead aircraft while it made the interception.

LeMay used the Rex's noon position report of 11 May in conjunction with known routes and speeds of ocean liners bound for New York to calculate an intercept point for the next day, based on the ship's expected noon position for 12 May. An updated position report to refine his calculations was expected that evening but not received. Weather conditions deteriorated during the night, with a forecast that "ceilings would be down to nothing" in the vicinity of the anticipated interception.

=== Interception ===
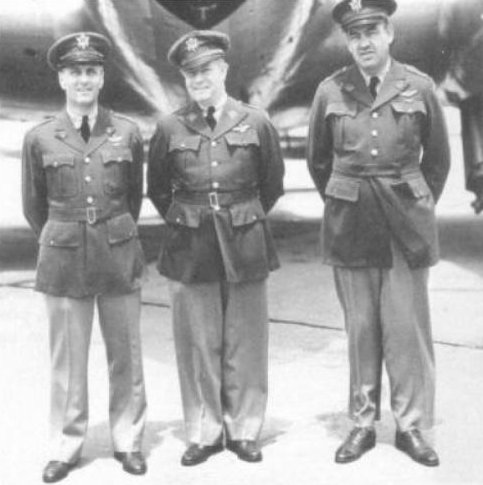
Majors Vincent L. Meloy (center) and Caleb V. Haynes (right) during 1938 goodwill visit to Bogotá, Colombia

At 08:30 on 12 May, the three B-17s had begun to taxi in a rain squall when a morning position report from Rex was relayed to LeMay. (Note: LeMay wrote that the report was on a soaked piece of paper hand-delivered by a sergeant who literally beat on the hatch of the B-17 to get the bomber to stop.) It indicated that the liner was then 725 nautical miles (1,300 km) from New York, farther east than his original computations had placed it. LeMay's original flight plan had incorporated an area search if necessary, but weather conditions and the ship's distance from Long Island precluded that possibility.

The B-17s took off from Mitchel Field at 08:45 and cruised east from Sandy Hook at 170 mph (270 km/h) on a true course of 101 degrees through rain, hail, downdrafts, and an intense headwind that reduced their ground speed by 11.5 mph (18.5 km/h). LeMay was unable to check the effect of the winds on ground speed and drift because of a heavy overcast that limited their altitude to 1,100 feet (340 m). At 10:00 they emerged into good weather that lasted an hour. LeMay took double drifts (Note: The Double Drift Maneuver is a method of wind determination that calculates winds aloft by taking drift readings on two different headings, then calculating the wind trigonometrically by plotting vectors on a graph.) until the B-17s had to separate to transit a cold front. At 11:15 they reassembled in clear weather on the other side, where LeMay checked their course again. He calculated an intercept time of 12:25 for his pilot, who in turn passed it to Meloy to schedule the live radio broadcast. At noon the B-17s encountered an area of "scattered rain squalls"; they spread into a line abreast formation, about 15 nautical miles (28 km) apart, to increase their chances of spotting the Rex.

At 12:23, the bombers broke out of a squall line, and Cousland in No. 81 immediately sighted the Rex. "There it is! There it is!" he transmitted by radio to the other pilots, "81 to 80, twelve o'clock." At 12:25, as predicted, the B-17s flew by the Rex while it was 620 nautical miles (1,100 km) east of Sandy Hook. (Note: Many sources indicate that Rex was 725 miles (1,200 km) from New York, while others state 800 miles (1,300 km), possibly in confusion over statute and nautical miles. The "725" figure, however, came from Rex's reported position at 08:30. The Air Corps News Letter (15 June 1938) account indicated that the captain of the Rex reported during the radio contact between B-17s and ship that it "was the first time he had been welcomed to America while still 620 miles offshore" and is calculated here in nautical miles, as the ship would have to have been making 40 knots to cover the difference between 725 nautical miles (1300 km) and 620 statute miles (1000 km) in four hours. Calculated entirely in nautical miles places her passage at 27 knots, her rated speed.) The aircraft reversed course and came up the ship's port side, with No. 82 flying wing on No. 80 "at smoke stack level". From the co-pilot's seat of No. 81, Goddard took a series of photographs with the Graflex. In the waist position of No. 80, Meloy made voice contact by radio with the ship's captain, who invited "all members of the flight to come down to lunch". The ship's passengers filled its decks, waving to the bombers, with a group of Americans purportedly singing the "Star Spangled Banner".

Because of the bad weather, the B-17s returned individually to Mitchel Field. Cousland's Flying Fortress encountered severe hail, damaging all the forward surfaces of the plane, and ice caused a temporary shutdown of one engine. As a result, Cousland lagged behind the others, landing at 16:30. The next morning the three bombers took off to return to Harrisburg and spotted the Rex passing the Statue of Liberty at 09:30 as it entered New York Harbor.

The NBC radio crew aboard the lead bomber made its live broadcast coast-to-coast as the bombers flew by the Rex. The Army's low-altitude photographs were featured the next day on the front pages of hundreds of newspapers. Eaker exploited a trust of Americans in radio broadcasts and in photography, particular in that era, to bolster the credibility of Air Corps claims that air power was essential in defending the Western Hemisphere. In addition to the Rex episode, the May 1938 maneuvers conducted a well-publicized mock attack on New York City, and arranged the first voluntary blackout in the United States, also planned by Eaker, during a mock raid on Farmingdale, New York, on 16 May.

== Aftermath ==
=== Impact ===
The response of the War Department was to curb further expansion of the Air Corps and its roles. On 16 May, the day of the "Farmingdale raid", the Army's deputy chief of staff, Major General Stanley Embick, approved a request from Air Corps chief, Major General Oscar Westover, to substitute a single Boeing Y1B-20 (an advanced design of the Boeing B-15) for two B-15s ordered for Project A, the development program for the very long range bomber. On 9 June, however, Secretary of War Harry Woodring countermanded the approval, which he had endorsed only three weeks before. On 3 August, the Army went on to cancel orders for 67 more B-17s authorized under a "balanced" plan Woodring himself had put forth in March, instead allocating the funds to buy smaller combat aircraft, and forbade any further spending for R&D of long-range bombers.

It was not until January 1939, when U.S. President Franklin D. Roosevelt issued a public statement calling for an expansion of the Air Corps in anticipation of the coming of World War II and the needs of the United States in defending the Western Hemisphere, that Army policy was reversed. General George C. Marshall, who was soon to move up from head of the War Plans Division to be the Army's chief of staff, received personal instruction on the capabilities and strengths of long-range bombers from new Air Corps chief, General Henry H. Arnold.

=== Operational restriction ===
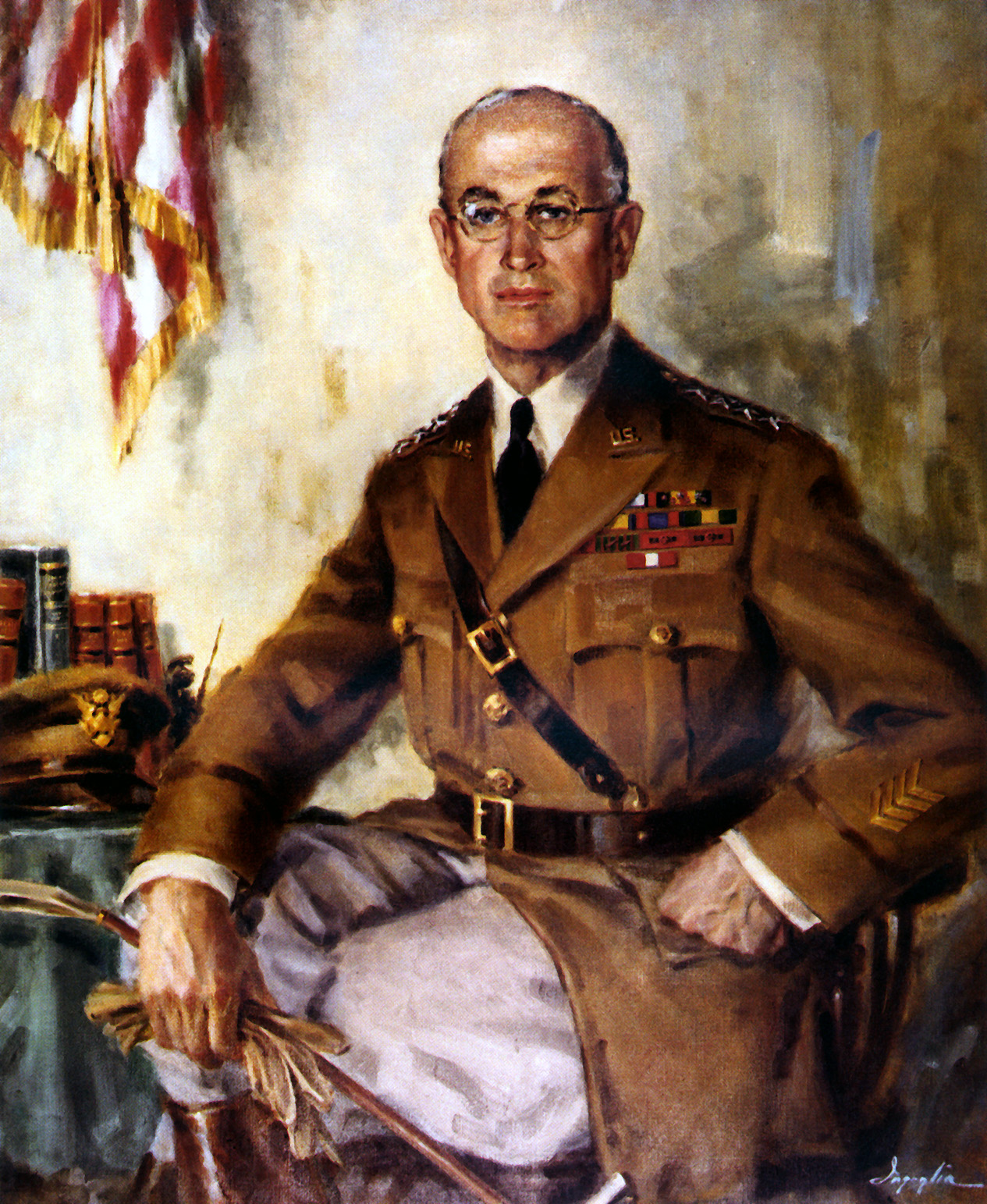
Gen. Malin Craig, Army Chief of Staff from 1935 to 1939

The day after the rendezvous with the Rex, Chief of Staff General Malin Craig telephoned Andrews and issued an order that restricted all Air Corps aircraft to operating within 100 nautical miles (190 km) of the coast. Arnold, Eaker, Olds, and Lieutenant Colonel Carl Spaatz all believed that complaints from the Navy motivated the order. Spaatz, who personally answered the call, recorded that Andrews requested the order be issued in writing, but Arnold stated that he never saw a written order. (Note: Arnold's corroboration is especially valuable in that he and Gen. Craig were long-time friends.)

Two Air Corps historians state that no evidence exists that the Navy was behind the order. One explained that Craig believed the Air Corps violated War Department policy on publicity, while the second asserted that Craig was unhappy about not being provided details of the mission before it was publicly announced, and thus issued the order to ensure full notification before granting exceptions to the restriction. Deputy Chief of Staff Embick made the claim that the restriction had been issued only as a safety measure. Greer, however, in his history of Air Corps doctrine, firmly attributes the restriction to the Navy, noting that in November 1938 it achieved a new modification of the joint action statement specifically granting it the authorization for long-range land-based flights that the Army was denied, and immediately prepared six major bases to conduct them. A fourth historian, in a biography of Arnold, stated that the restriction had actually been promulgated on 1 September 1936, at the insistence of the Navy, but was not enforced by Craig until after the Rex incident. (Note: The actual source of the "100-mile restriction" remains a mystery. The AAF did extensive document searches in both 1945 and 1946 to clarify the situation, the 1946 search at the request of Hanson Baldwin, and concluded "that the Army, not the Navy" was the source. (Maurer 1987, p. 573, note 29) At least three times before the Rex interception the Army had restricted operational flights to 100 miles at sea as a safety measure in 1936-1937, but for the shorter-ranged two-engine B-10. That the restriction existed is beyond doubt. Maurer notes that Craig ordered a "directive" formalizing it be drawn up on 4 August 1938, and it remained in effect at least until Marshall became chief of staff. Only the Navy's role, if any, is disputed.)

In any event, the restriction fomented further interservice enmity between the Air Corps and the Navy that did not abate until World War II. The Navy specifically included the 100 nautical miles (190 km) limit in plans for joint maneuvers in 1939 that was deleted only after Andrews objected to Marshall, who had replaced Embick as deputy chief of staff. Emmons, who succeeded Andrews as commander of GHQ Air Force, complained in his "Report on Annual Tactical Inspection", dated 28 July 1939, that because of the operational restriction, navigation training in the Air Corps had suffered.

Despite this, exceptions to the restriction quickly became the norm. Only a month after the interception of the Rex, B-17s intercepted the 22,000-ton liner SS Queen of Bermuda 300 nautical miles (560 km) at sea on 12 June, (Note: Haynes and Smith piloted two of the three B-17s involved.) and aircraft based in Hawaii twice located Army transports at similar distances during the summer of 1938. In March 1939, Arnold, as Chief of the Air Corps, was given specific authority by the chief of staff to grant exceptions as he saw fit, provided they were unpublicized and he notified the War Department well in advance.

=== Subsequent history of the participants ===
Andrews was not reappointed as commander of General Headquarters Air Force when his term expired on 1 March 1939. Exactly as happened with Billy Mitchell, he was returned in rank to colonel (his permanent establishment rank) and assigned as air officer of the Eighth Corps Area in San Antonio, Texas. His "exile" in San Antonio was brief, however. In August, prospective Army Chief of Staff Marshall had Andrews promoted over the objections of Secretary Woodring and General Craig, beginning a climb to higher command for Andrews that culminated in promotion to lieutenant general and appointment as commander of the European Theater of Operations. Many senior airmen believed he was possibly being groomed to command the Normandy invasion. However, Andrews was killed in the crash of a Consolidated B-24 Liberator long-range bomber in Iceland in May 1943 while returning to Washington, D.C.

Captain Archibald Y. Smith was promoted to colonel during World War II, commanded the 452nd Bomb Group (B-17) in the U.K., and became a prisoner of war in July 1944. Continuing his career after the war in the United States Air Force, he died in the crash of his Douglas B-26 in Oregon in April 1949. Cousland also became a colonel and commanded the first B-17 group in England, the 97th BG, although he was relieved of command by Colonel Frank A. Armstrong just before it was to go into combat. Cousland finished the war commanding the 21st Bombardment Wing, a processing unit for personnel returning from overseas.

Seven of the participants became general officers. Hull was recalled to active duty to be an intelligence officer in World War II, then remained in the Air Force as a career. He retired as a brigadier general in 1964. Meloy served as a brigadier general in the Air Transport Command and retired in 1946. Goddard was recognized as the principal aerial photography expert of the USAF and retired in 1953 as a brigadier general. Caleb V. Haynes and his crew won the MacKay Trophy in 1939 flying an earthquake relief mission to Chile in the Boeing XB-15, and delivered the first B-24 Liberator to the UK, pioneering the northern Atlantic route in July 1941. Assigned initially to the Tenth Air Force, he was the first commander of the Assam-Burma-China Ferry Command, the airlift operation flying supplies over the Hump to China. Haynes went on to command the bombers of the China Air Task Force under Major General Claire Chennault, became a brigadier general, commanded the India Air Task Force, and retired from the USAF as a major general in 1953.

Olds (whose son, Brigadier General Robin Olds, became a fighter pilot icon), was promoted to major general and commanded the Second Air Force, but died of a heart-related condition in April 1943 at the age of 46.

Eaker and LeMay had important roles as commanders in the strategic bombing campaigns of World War II. Eaker took command of the Eighth Air Force in 1942, and the Mediterranean Allied Air Forces in 1944. He retired in 1947 as a lieutenant general, but was promoted on the retired list to 4-star general in 1985 in recognition of his accomplishments. In the autumn of 1942, LeMay led the 305th Bomb Group, one of the four "pioneer" B-17 groups of the Eighth Air Force. He advanced to higher commands in the Eighth Air Force before holding a series of Boeing B-29 Superfortress commands in the Pacific in 1944–45, culminating in command of the Twentieth Air Force. LeMay commanded and reorganized the Strategic Air Command into an instrument of national policy and became the fifth Chief of Staff of the United States Air Force in 1961.

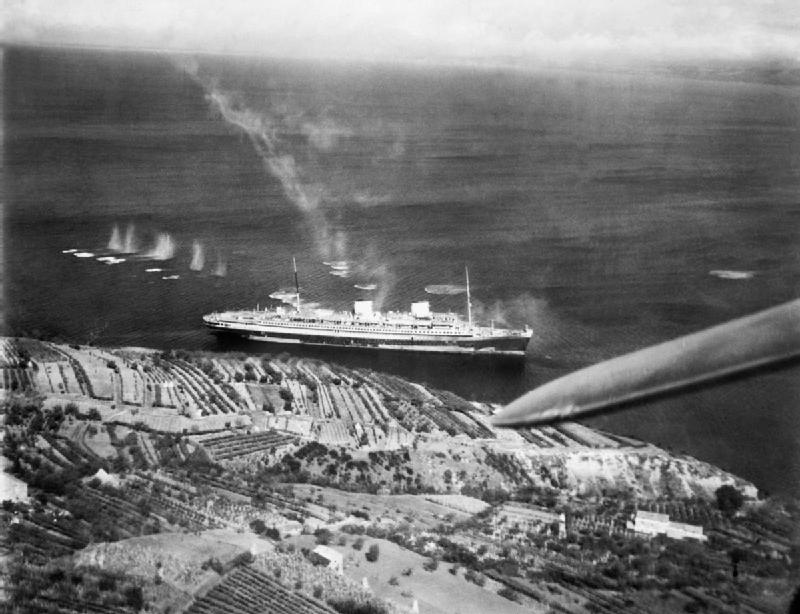
No. 272 Squadron RAF Beaufighter, climbing away after strafing Rex (8 September 1944)

Laid up in Trieste harbor, Italy, by the war, Rex was seized by Nazi Germany when Italy changed to the Allied side in 1943. On 8 September 1944, south of Trieste she was attacked twice by Royal Air Force Bristol Beaufighters. She was set on fire and listing by rockets and cannon shells. Following a second attack by RAF and South African Air Force Beaufighters Rex rolled over and sank. The purpose of the attack was to prevent her from being used to block the harbor entrance. The wreck was partially scrapped in the 1950s, but around one-third of it still remains.

The YB-17s quickly became obsolete and were transferred in October 1940 to the 19th Bomb Group at March Field, California, when the 2nd BG acquired newer models. During World War II they operated again at Langley Field until mid-1942. The Air Corps belatedly put the B-17 into mass production beginning in July 1940, but at the time of the attack on Pearl Harbor still had only 198 in service. However, 12,000 were produced during the war, became the backbone of the air war against Germany, and were an iconic symbol of the AAF.

The 2nd Bomb Group received newer B-17s and served in the Mediterranean Theater of Operations with both the Twelfth and Fifteenth air forces. GHQ Air Force assumed its designated wartime role in November 1940, was renamed Air Force Combat Command in June 1941, but went out of existence in March 1942 in a major reorganization of the United States Army Air Forces.

=== Operation Rex Redux ===
On 24 August 2007, three B-52 Stratofortresses of the 2nd Bomb Wing, successor to the 2nd BG, conducted "Operation Rex Redux", a training mission commemorating the interception of the Rex. Flying from Barksdale Air Force Base, Louisiana, and using the radio call signs Rex 51, Rex 52, and Rex 53, the B-52s intercepted the Military Sealift Command ship MV 2nd Lt. John P. Bobo east of Bermuda to test the capabilities of a new targeting system.

== Bibliography ==
- Cate, James L. (1945). USAF Historical Study 112: The History of the Twentieth Air Force: Genesis. Air Force Historical Research Agency
- Coffey, Thomas M. (1982). Hap: The Story of the U.S. Air Force and the Man Who Built It, General Henry H. Arnold, Penguin USA. ISBN 0-670-36069-4
- Copp, DeWitt S. (1989). A Few Great Captains: The Men and Events That Shaped the Development of U.S. Air Power, EPM Publishing. ISBN 978-0939009299
- Copp, DeWitt S. (2003). Frank M. Andrews: Marshall's Airman, Air Force History and Museums Program, Washington D.C.
- Freeman, Roger A. (1970). The Mighty Eighth: A History of the Units, Men and Machines of the US 8th Air Force. Motorbooks International. ISBN 0-87938-638-X
- Futrell, Robert Frank (1971, 1991). Ideas, Concepts, and Doctrines: Basic Thinking in the United States Air Force 1907–1960, Air University Press
- Goss, William A. (1954). "Origins of the Army Air Forces". In Craven, Wesley F.; Cate, James L. (eds.). The Army Air Forces in World War II Vol. Six: Men and Planes. University of Chicago Press. ISBN 0-912799-03-X.
- Greer, Thomas H. (1985). The Development of Air Doctrine in the Army Air Arm, 1917–1941 (PDF). Maxwell Air Force Base: (USAF Historical Study 89). Center For Air Force History. Archived from the original (PDF) on 13 March 2013.
- Head, William (1995). Every Inch a Soldier: Augustine Warner Robins and the Building of US Airpower. Texas A&M University Press. ISBN 978-0585192376
- Hinrichs, Edward (1995). Missing Planes of the 452nd Bomb Group, Trafford Publishing. ISBN 1-4120-3321-7
- Huston, John W. (2002). "Biography". In Maj. Gen. John W. Huston, USAF (ed.). American Airpower Comes of Age: General Henry H. "Hap" Arnold's World War II Diaries. Air University Press. ISBN 1-58566-093-0.
- Jablonski, Edward (1965). Flying Fortress: The Illustrated Biography of the B-17s and the Men Who Flew Them, Doubleday & Company, ISBN 0-385-03855-0
- Kludas, Arnold (1999). Record Breakers of the North Atlantic: Blue Riband Liners 1838–1952. Brassey's, Inc. ISBN 1-57488-328-3
- LeMay, Curtis E., and Kantor, MacKinlay (1965). Mission with LeMay, My Story, Doubleday and Company, Inc. ASIN B00005WGR2
- Maurer, Maurer (1987). Aviation in the U.S. Army, 1919–1939, Office of Air Force History, Washington, D.C. ISBN 1-4102-1391-9
- Maurer, Maurer (1986). "Air Force Combat Units of World War II". New York Military Affairs Symposium. Archived from the original on 6 January 2009.
- Sherwood, John Darrell (1999). Fast Movers: Jet Pilots and the Vietnam Experience. Free Press. ISBN 0-312-97962-2
- Shiner, Lt.Col. John F. (1997). "The Coming of GHQ Air Force", Winged Shield, Winged Sword: A History of the United States Air Force, Vol.1 1907–1950. USAF. ISBN 0-16-049009-X
- Tate, Dr. James P. (1998). The Army and its Air Corps: Army Policy Toward Aviation 1919–1941, Air University Press. ISBN 0-16-061379-5
- Underwood, Jeffrey S. (1991). The Wings of Democracy: The Influence of Air Power on the Roosevelt Administration, 1933–1941. Texas A&M University Press. ISBN 0-89096-388-6
- Weaver, Herbert (1948). Craven, Wesley F.; Cate, James L. (eds.). "Commitments to China". The Army Air Forces in World War II: Volume I, Plans and Early Operations January 1939 to August 1942. Hyperwar.
- Williams, Edwin L. Jr. (1953). USAF Historical Study No. 84: Legislative History of the AAF and USAF, 1941–1951 Air Force Historical research Agency
- Zamzow, Major S.L., USAF, (2008), Ambassador of American Airpower: Major General Robert Olds, Air University, Maxwell Air Force Base, Alabama, SAASS Thesis published on-line

== Journals and periodicals ==
- Correll, John T. (December 2008). "Rendezvous With the Rex". Air & Space Forces Magazine. Vol. 91, no. 12. Archived from the original on 22 November 2025.
- Correll, John T. (September 2008). "GHQ Air Force" (PDF). Air & Space Forces Magazine. Vol. 91, no. 9. Archived (PDF) from the original on 5 January 2026.
- Correll, John T. (June 2008). "Billy Mitchell and the Battleships" (PDF). Air & Space Forces Magazine. Vol. 91, no. 6. Archived (PDF) from the original on 5 January 2026.
- Green, Dr. Murray (1979). "The Shasta Disaster". Air University Review. 33 (2). Archived from the original on 23 November 2007.
- Hebert, Adam J. (December 2007). "Rex Replay" (PDF). Air & Space Forces Magazine. Vol. 90, no. 12. Archived (PDF) from the original on 5 January 2026.
- Johnsen, Frederick A. (October 2006). "The Making of an Iconic Bomber" (PDF). Air & Space Forces Magazine. Vol. 89, no. 10. Archived (PDF) from the original on 7 August 2024.
- Langley Field Correspondent (1938). "Off-Shore Reconnaissance Flight". Air Corps News Letter. XXI (15 June). Archived from the original on 26 January 2016.
- LeMay, Gen. Curtis E. (September 1965). "U.S. Air Force: Power For Peace". National Geographic. 128 (3).
- Shepherd, Richard (1999). "Fortress Down!". Air Classics (Oct).
