= Henry Oldys =

American ornithologist

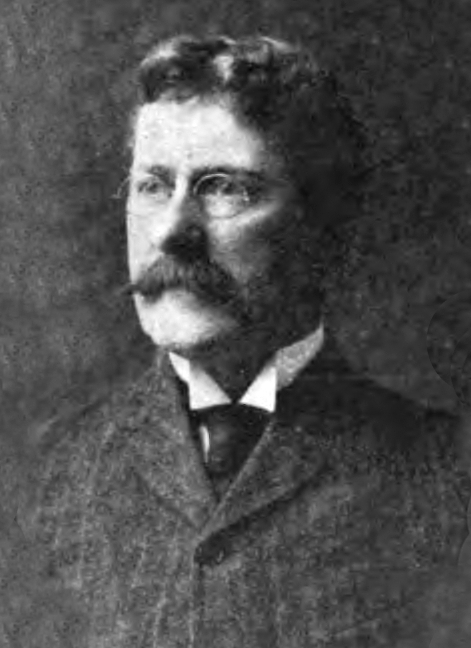

Henry Worthington Oldys born Olds (26 March 1859 – 20 January 1925) was an American ornithologist who took a special interest in the study of bird song.

== Life and work ==
Oldys was born to Rev. Marcus Lafayette and Katharine Sargent Olds in Washington DC. He studied at public schools in Washington, DC, before going to Columbia Law School. He then joined the auditor's office and in 1899 he was transferred to the Biological Survey under the Department of Agriculture. He was involved in establishing game laws, examining the import of game birds into the US, working alongside T. S. Palmer. He produced annual summaries and reports as part of the Biological Survey. In 1910 he wrote a booklet on pheasant raising. He was trained in music, sang and played the piano, and had a special interest in the songs of birds, which he studied and documented using musical notation. He recorded that the Carolina wren had 40 variations in its song. In 1912 he resigned from his work and began to give talks around the country on bird song. Oldys believed that bird song was meant to please the human ear, claiming that the "evolution of bird music independently parallels the evolution of human music and that, therefore, such evolution in each case is not fortuitous, but tends inevitably toward a fixed ideal." In his lectures, particularly on the Redpath Chautauqua circuit, he gave anecdotes and also gave song imitations. During World War I he worked in Paris as an auditor and spent some time volunteering with the YMCA in Poland. In 1916 he wrote the preface of a book on bird songs for children written by a William Benjamin Olds (1874-1948). He was interested in publishing a book on bird song but this did not materialize. He was a corresponding member of the Royal Hungarian Bureau of Ornithology, and a founding member of the Audubon Society of the District of Columbia. He was also a member of the Bicycle Club. He married May Clendenin Meigs on 2 April 1891 and they had 3 children including Robert Olds who became a US Army Air Forces general.
