= Robert Olds =

United States Army Air Forces general

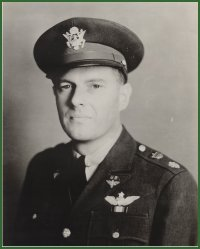
- Robert Olds
- Born: Robert Oldys; June 15, 1896; Woodside, Maryland, U.S.
- Died: April 28, 1943 (aged 46); Tucson, Arizona, U.S.
- Spouses: Eloise Wichman Nott (m. 1921; died 1926) Marjorie Langley (m. 1928; div. 1930) Helen Sterling (m. 1933; div. 1940) Nina S. Gore (m. 1942)
- Children: 4, including Robin Olds
- Military career
- Allegiance: United States
- Branch: Aviation Section, Signal Corps; Air Service, United States Army; United States Army Air Corps; United States Army Air Forces
- Service years: 1917–1943
- Rank: Major General
- Commands: 17th Aero Squadron; 5th Composite Group; 2d Bombardment Group; Air Corps Ferrying Command; Second Air Force
- Conflicts: World War I; World War II
- Awards: Distinguished Service Medal; Distinguished Flying Cross

Robert Olds (June 15, 1896 – April 28, 1943) was a general officer in the United States Army Air Forces, theorist of strategic air power, and proponent of an independent United States Air Force. Olds is best known today as the father of Brig. Gen. Robin Olds, a "triple ace" fighter pilot of World War II and the Vietnam War.

He became an instructor at the Air Corps Tactical School between 1928 and 1931, the crucial period when the theory of strategic bombardment achieved ascendancy within the Air Corps as the most effective use of airpower. With eight colleagues at the ACTS, he was a member of the "Bomber Mafia," whose influence led to adoption of the theory as the doctrine of daylight precision bombing during World War II. Olds was a persuasive, sometimes controversial figure in the unsuccessful campaign during the 1930s to promote air force independence, but the bombardment doctrine the clique championed ultimately became the foundation for separation from the Army.

Olds was also an accomplished aviator and flight leader. As commander of the 2d Bombardment Group between 1937 and 1940, he led the first operational unit of B-17 Flying Fortresses and put theory into practice by overseeing the development of standard operating procedures for the heavy bomber. Olds showcased the capabilities of the new weapon by leading several highly publicized goodwill flights to South America.

Despite his advocacy for strategic bombing, during the United States' participation in World War II Olds did not command bombers in the field. Instead his major contribution to the war effort was creation and organization of the Air Corps Ferrying Command, whose task was delivery of newly produced aircraft to all parts of the globe, and which eventually became the Air Transport Command and successors. Health problems resulted in his transfer to a training command and led to his early death in 1943.

== Personal history ==
=== Family ===
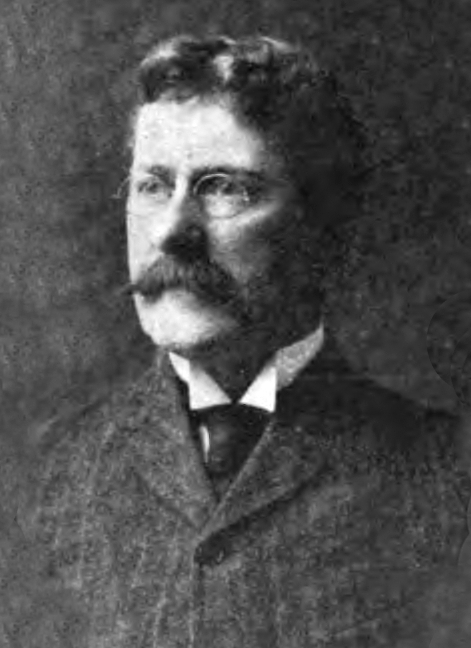
Henry Oldys, ornithologist

Olds was born Robert Oldys June 15, 1896, in Woodside, Maryland, to Henry Oldys (born Henry Worthington Olds) (Note: Henry Oldys changed the spelling of the family surname from "Olds" to "Oldys" (still pronounced "Olds") before Robert's birth, apparently in reference to an ancestral spelling. Olds used this spelling until 1931, when he reverted to the original. To avoid confusion, the name "Olds" is used throughout this article.) and May Clendenin (née Meigs) Oldys. He was the eldest of four siblings. His father was an ornithologist employed by the Division of Biological Survey of the Department of Agriculture. His grandfather was Mark Lafayette Olds, a former physician, infantry veteran of the Mexican–American War, and Episcopal minister of Christ Church on Capitol Hill in the District of Columbia who stood on the gallows at the hanging on July 7, 1865, of the conspirators in the Abraham Lincoln assassination.

Olds married four times. His first marriage, to Eloise Karine Wichman, the ex-wife of Frederick Dickson Nott, in Honolulu, Hawaii, on October 22, 1921, resulted in sons Robert Jr. (later Robin Olds; 1922–2007) and Stevan Meigs (1924–1988). She had had another child, Carter Nott (1919–1998), from her previous marriage.

Eloise died in 1926 while Olds was assigned to the headquarters of the Air Service in Washington, D.C. In 1928 he remarried, to Marjorie Langley (née Marvin), a divorcée with two sons from her previous marriage, and they were divorced in 1930.

His third marriage, in 1933 to Helen Post Sterling, also resulted in two sons, Sterling Meigs ("Dusty"; 1935–1995) and Frederick A. (born in 1936). They separated in 1939 and were divorced in 1940.

His last marriage was to Nina S. Gore, daughter of Senator Thomas Gore, in June 1942. (Note: Mrs. Auchincloss had also married multiple times, with her first marriage some 20 years earlier to Lt. Gene Vidal, a fellow Air Service pilot of Olds, a member of President Franklin Roosevelt's administration, and Gore Vidal's father.)

=== Personality ===
Olds was "personable and charismatic," and highly outspoken, the latter strongly influenced by his association with General William "Billy" Mitchell. Commendations and efficiency reports consistently praised him for "enthusiasm," "energy," "initiative," "drive," and attention to detail. He developed a knack for generating favorable publicity during his tour in Hawaii which resulted in his often being in the public spotlight during his entire career.

While noted as being skilled in the "art of diplomacy," particularly as an emissary for air power, his tact sometimes failed him. His outspokenness resulted in several public rebukes, notably during the Billy Mitchell court martial, and in flaps regarding "imprudent comments" he allegedly made during his goodwill trip to Argentina in 1938 and a congressional junket to Alaska in 1942.

His leadership was professionally esteemed by prominent Air Force leaders and historians, several of whom wrote that, but for his early death, he would have risen to four-star rank. He was exceptionally capable of inspiring subordinates, and of delegating authority, while remaining a firm disciplinarian. Of his decision-making ability, he was described as having quick reactions, sharp responses, and the "courage of his convictions." His friend and "Bomber Mafia" associate, Lt. Gen. Harold L. George, wrote: "He had a brilliant mind... He could grasp instantly, vexing details which usually make up difficult problems and, grasping them, he had the priceless ability to make a decision. He did not mull over what to do—having studied the problem, having arrived at a decision, he made it at once."

Friends and family noted that Olds, although a "hard-core, never-quit perfectionist," had outlets for his energies besides his work. After intense problems he would relax by playing squash or by doing aerobatics in a P-1 Hawk maintained at the base. His son Robin recalled how they would share afternoons sitting on the front porch of their quarters at Langley Field, Virginia, watching planes land. His home at Langley was a social gathering place for numerous aviation pioneers, war veterans, and air power advocates which included Eddie Rickenbacker, Fiorello La Guardia, Ernst Udet, Roscoe Turner, Elliott White Springs, Jimmie Mattern, and Beirne Lay. When the gatherings included his neighbor, Lt. Col. Carl Spaatz, (Note: When Spaatz elected to legally change the spelling of his surname from "Spatz" to "Spaatz" at the urging of his wife Ruth, Olds recommended to him the same attorney he had used for his own name change.) his son fondly noted, they often ended with singing accompanied by Olds on the piano and Spaatz on the guitar.

Olds had a reputation for irascibility, part of which may have been due to arthritis, noted General William H. Tunner, a subordinate at Air Corps Ferrying Command in 1941. He was often in pain but not crippled by the affliction. Tunner went on to describe Olds:

He had energy to burn, on and off the job. He loved high living, and he loved women, too, for that matter; he'd been married four times by that time. He drove himself furiously and within a year he was a major general. Within another year he was dead. He'd given all he had.

== Military career ==
=== Signal Corps and Air Service ===
Olds graduated from Central High School in Washington, D.C. He enlisted in the Aviation Section, Signal Enlisted Reserve Corps on January 16, 1917, became a sergeant, and entered pilot training at the Curtis Flying School, Newport News, Virginia. By the time he received his Reserve Military Aviator rating on May 15, 1917, the United States had entered World War I. (Note: Olds received Fédération Aéronautique Internationale (FAI) Aviator Certificate 8803 at the same time as his RMA rating.)

On June 7, 1917, he was commissioned as a 1st lieutenant in the Signal Officers Reserve Corps. His first assignment was as commander of the newly organized and untrained 17th Aero Squadron at Kelly Field, Texas, on August 2. The next day the squadron entrained for Toronto, Ontario, Canada, where they arrived August 4 to begin unit training with the Royal Flying Corps. After three weeks of recruit instruction at Leaside Aerodrome, personnel of the 17th were distributed to various locations for specialized training, while Olds and the squadron headquarters were located at Camp Borden, Ontario. Olds remained squadron commander until October 15, when he became a flying instructor at Scott Field, Illinois.

In December 1917 Olds was transferred as an instructor to Ellington Field, Texas, where he advanced through various supervisory positions, beginning with solo and formation stages and progressing to Officer-In-Charge (OIC) Flying and OIC Training. He was promoted to captain on September 3, 1918, and sent to France.

Capt. Olds was assigned to pursuit training at the 3rd Aviation Instruction Center at Issoudun on September 25. After completing the course, he was assigned to the 7th Aviation Instruction Center at Clermont-Ferrand, where he became "Training Officer for Bombardment" and later Officer-In-Charge. On January 14, 1919, during demobilization of the American Expeditionary Force, Olds was assigned to the staff of Col. Frank P. Lahm, chief of Air Service, Second Army at Toul as flight examiner (and Lahm's pilot), a post he held until April 29. He returned to Washington, D.C., in August 1919.

Olds transferred to Fort Ruger at Honolulu, Hawaii, in October 1919, as Air Service Operations Officer, with concurrent command of the 3rd Balloon Company. A reserve officer, he decided to remain in the military but needed a regular commission to avoid being demobilized by the National Defense Act of 1920, which reduced the Army by 50%. Air Service commanders in Hawaii submitted three letters of recommendation on his behalf, he passed the requisite qualifying examinations, and on July 1, 1920, when the law took effect, Olds received commissions as 1st lieutenant and captain of Air Service of the Regular Army. (Note: The 1920 National Defense Act had a provision allowing officers who earned Air Service rank in the AEF to retain it, thus automatically promoting Olds to captain.)

In July 1921 Olds was assigned operations officer of the 5th Observation Group at Luke Field. He became its commander from April 12, 1922, to May 20, 1922, and again (now the 5th Composite Group) from November 10, 1922, to April 13, 1923. During his Hawaiian tour, Olds was credited with the first night flight over Oahu on June 30, 1920; the first flight to Molokai, on August 18, 1920; and the first flight over Haleakalā crater on August 25, flying de Havilland DH-4Bs.

Olds transferred in 1923 to the Office of the Chief of Air Service in Washington, D.C., where he worked in the War Plans Division, often as an aide to the Assistant Chief of the Air Service, Gen. Mitchell. In October 1925 he assisted Mitchell during the Morrow Board hearings, and the following month at Mitchell's court martial. With his career conceivably in jeopardy, Olds testified on November 10, describing the dangerous conditions under which the Air Service was forced to operate, and a lack of understanding of aviation requirements on the part of non-flying senior staff and commanders. Although mocked and questioned with sarcastic hostility during cross-examination by the nine ground forces generals comprising the panel, Olds "held his own".

=== Air Corps ===
"A determined air armada loaded with modern agencies of destruction, in readiness within range of our great centers of population and industry, may eventually prove to be a more convincing argument against war than all the Hague and Geneva Conventions put together."
Capt. Robert Olds, testimony before the Howell Commission, November 1934

In July 1926 the Air Service was renamed the Air Corps by Act of Congress as a compromise alternative to creating an independent or autonomous air force. Olds continued his staff duties in the Office of the Chief of the Air Corps.

In September 1927 he was assigned to Langley Field, where he would spend eleven of the next thirteen years. He became a student in the eighth class of the Air Corps Tactical School. Among his 23 classmates were Majors Frank M. Andrews, George H. Brett, and Willis H. Hale, all of whom would become senior leaders of the Army Air Forces, and John F. Curry (one of his sponsors to the Regular Army in 1920), who would become school commandant several years later.

Following his completion of the course, Olds was invited in July 1928 to become an instructor at ACTS. In the next class was 1st Lt. Kenneth N. Walker, who had also been a Mitchell aide, and in 1929 he too became an ACTS instructor. Together they served as the Bombardment Section of the ACTS faculty. Between 1929 and 1931, when the school moved from Langley to Maxwell Field, Alabama, they were responsible for the ascendancy of bombardment (which existed mainly in theory and undeveloped technology) over pursuit as the primary emphasis of both the ACTS curriculum and the development of Air Corps doctrine. Haywood S. Hansell, who with Olds, Walker, and six others would become a clique known as the "Bomber Mafia," wrote of them:

Bob Olds and Ken Walker together were dangerously close to being a "critical mass." Both were almost explosively intense and dynamic. Under them the Bombardment Section forged ahead...They had adopted Ken's contention that bombardment was to air power what the infantry was to the Army-the basic arm..."A well planned and well conducted bombardment attack, once launched, cannot be stopped."

When ACTS relocated to Alabama in June 1931, Olds remained at Langley as Operations Officer to the 2d Bombardment Group to September 1933. He then was selected to attend the two years' course of the Command and General Staff School at Fort Leavenworth, Kansas. (Note: Kenneth Walker was Olds' classmate at the two-years' course.) His role as an air power advocate continued to expand when in November 1934 he was one of six current and former ACTS instructors invited by name to appear before the Federal Aviation Commission. Chaired by Clark Howell, the commission was created by President Franklin D. Roosevelt to review all aspects of U.S. aviation and became the sixteenth board since 1919 to examine the military's role in it. Olds' appearance before the commission was an act of moral courage, inasmuch as the General Staff tried to discourage the instructors' appearance by refusing to reimburse their expenses. (Note: The General Staff quickly reversed that decision. It authorized the use of Army aircraft for travel and allowed per diem from the Howell commission, but the group still testified amidst concerns for their careers.)

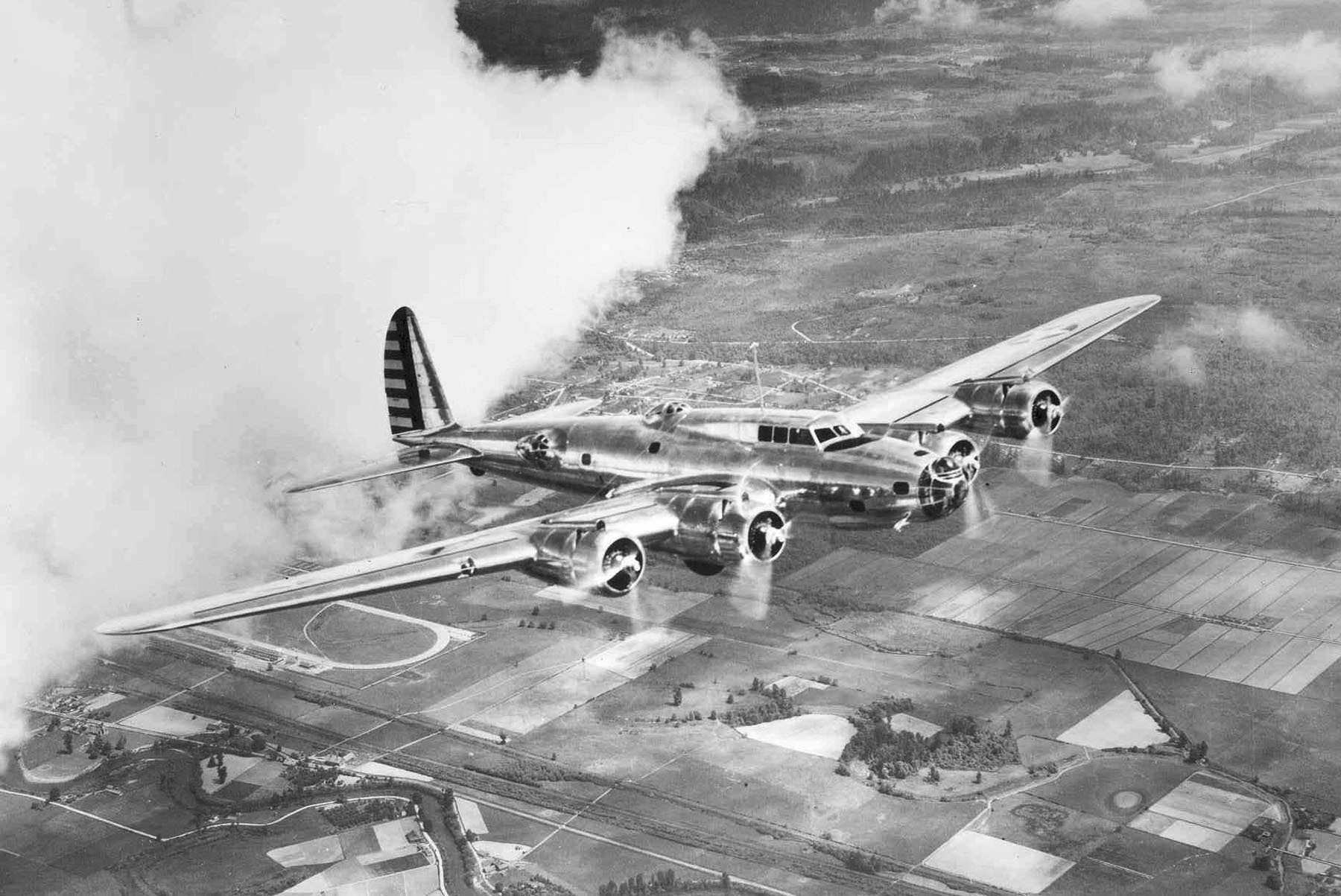
Boeing YB-17 of 2nd BG, 1937

Following completion of CGSS on June 21, 1935, Olds was promoted to major (temporary on June 30 and permanent on August 1). He returned to Langley, where the command staff of the General Headquarters Air Force was stationed, and joined it as Chief of Inspection Section under GHQAF commander Maj. Gen. Frank Andrews, the driving force behind acquisition of the B-17 Flying Fortress. On March 1, 1937, Olds was promoted to lieutenant colonel and selected to command the 2nd BG, which was about to receive the first twelve operational B-17s. (Note: Andrews chose Olds to supervise the program to avoid any mistakes with the new bomber. On December 7, 1936, before delivery to the Air Corps, the first YB-17 nosed over during landing, triggering a Congressional investigation which threatened cancellation of the program.) To fulfill a directive from Andrews to build a capability of conducting bombing missions anywhere in the world and in any weather, Olds' training emphasized competency in instrument landings and takeoffs, and long range navigation.

Olds' command tour at Langley developed standard operating procedures and tactics for the B-17, and was marked by numerous highly publicized exercises and goodwill missions. In August 1937 the group located and attacked the target ship USS Utah off California, followed in May 1938 by interception of the Italian liner Rex 620 miles at sea, both under adverse weather conditions. In January 1938, he made two record-breaking non-stop transcontinental flights between Langley and March Field, California, completing the 2,317 miles in just over 11 hours on the return flight. Olds personally led two goodwill flights to South America, first to Buenos Aires, Argentina, in February 1938 (for which he was awarded the Mackay Trophy and the Distinguished Flying Cross) and next to Rio de Janeiro, Brazil, in November 1939. A third to Bogotá, Colombia, was assigned to a squadron commander. In August 1938 the 2nd BG received the only Boeing XB-15 bomber built, and the following February Olds dispatched it on an earthquake relief mission to Santiago, Chile.

Olds ended his tour with the 2 BG by developing plans to reduce unit costs of new B-17s to facilitate procurement of 42 more bombers, and to train new aircrews without any reduction of standards in the face of an estimated expansion rate of 800%. Olds' next assignment was to the Plans Division of the Office of Chief of the Air Corps on January 5, 1940, working for Spaatz, who had been promoted to brigadier general. Olds advanced to colonel on October 16, 1940. While working in the Plans Division, he received a suggestion from Nancy Love, a woman aviator (and wife of an Air Corps Reserve friend, 1st Lt. Robert Love), that he give serious consideration of the use of women pilots to ferry new aircraft from the factory in case of war. Olds replied by asking her to provide him with a list of women pilots with commercial pilot ratings.

Meanwhile, and until the December 1941 attack on Pearl Harbor, Olds, together with Army Corps of Engineers Colonel later General Lucius D. Clay, selected construction sites for 457 new airports, which would form the nucleus of America's civil aviation network.

After passage of the Lend Lease Act in March 1941, the Air Corps was assigned to expedite the delivery of bombers to the Royal Air Force in Great Britain. Maj. Gen. Henry H. Arnold established the Air Corps Ferrying Command on May 28, 1941, and selected Olds to organize it, reporting directly to Arnold.

Olds selected a staff which included Col. Caleb V. Haynes, his pilot on the Rex interception, as his chief of staff and Major William H. Tunner as adjutant and chief of personnel. Olds developed a plan for expansion of three airfields in the United States to handle the movement of a thousand planes a month. Foreseeing a role in providing air transportation of personnel and cargo between the United States and the war zones, he drew up two ferry routes for courier-passenger service: a northern route to Great Britain via Greenland and Iceland, called the "Arnold Line" by the British, and a southern route through Brazil to Africa and after the United States entered the war, to the Middle and Far East. The southern route was pioneered for the Ferrying Command by a subsidiary of Pan American Airways, which had developed the airfields along the route as an agent of the U.S. government in 1940–41.

Passenger operations on the northern route began July 1, 1941, its first flight made by Haynes, and when the operation was suspended in October to winterize the transports and improve facilities, use of the southern route began on November 14. Movement of combat aircraft by the Ferrying Command beyond North America using the southern route began November 20. All of this activity in 1941 gave the United States a head start in developing the aerial lines of communication for its own forces which began in 1942, when the route was adopted for year-round movement of aircraft and units to the combat theaters, prepared, briefed and supported by the Ferrying Command.

=== Army Air Forces and World War II ===
When the United States entered the war, Olds immediately implemented a previously-prepared plan to use civil transport pilots to replace reserve military aviators recalled to their combat commands. His staff also drew up and put into action a plan to reorganize and expand the command. Olds was promoted to brigadier general on January 16, 1942, and personally handled the successful negotiations with neutral Brazil for the use of Natal as a key intermediate point. In its first nine months, the command delivered over 7,100 airplanes to their pick-up points.

The issue of using women pilots to ferry aircraft was revived by entry into the war. After first corresponding with Jacqueline Cochran in January 1942, Olds submitted a plan to Arnold proposing their use in a civil service status while fully integrating them into the Ferrying Command with male civilian pilots. The plan, however, had not been requested or endorsed by Arnold, who shelved it at the demand of Cochran, who opposed any plan that did not make female pilots commissioned officers commanded by women and wanted no official action taken while she was in Great Britain with her own group of prospective women pilots. By June, Olds was no longer in charge of air transport but his former staff became further involved when Nancy Love was introduced to Tunner, who as colonel in charge of ACFC's Domestic Division was responsible for acquiring civilian ferry pilots. At his direction Love drew up a plan similar to Olds' that Tunner forwarded to Arnold, who approved it. (Note: Tunner proposed commissioning Love, but the proposal was rejected.) As a result, the Women's Auxiliary Ferrying Squadron (WAFS), a civilian organization using women pilots already identified as qualified by Love, was created as a part of the Air Transport Command in September, just as Cochran returned from Britain. She was incensed, and Arnold immediately authorized creation of a second organization (under Cochran), the Women's Flying Training Detachment, to provide a source of new ferry pilots. In August 1943, the two organizations merged to establish the Women Airforce Service Pilots, better known as WASPs.

Olds' first heart attack took place in March 1942, resulting in his replacement in command by Harold L. George. Olds returned to duty on April 25, 1942, when he was made commander of III Bomber Command. However that assignment lasted only two weeks, and he became commanding general of the Second Air Force effective May 14, 1942, with promotion to major general on May 25. Olds moved his headquarters from Spokane, Washington, to a forward location at Davis-Monthan Field, Arizona, as Second Air Force expanded into a massive training establishment.

Early in 1943 Olds was diagnosed with pericardial disease and Libman-Sacks endocarditis. He required extensive hospitalization beginning February 25, 1943, was placed in temporary retirement, then suffered a second heart attack and pneumonia. He was awarded the Distinguished Service Medal by the War Department on April 15. His sons Robin and Stevan, both cadets at the United States Military Academy, were flown by B-17 to Tucson and were present when he died on April 28. Time Magazine reported that his ashes were "dead-marched into a Flying Fortress" at Davis Monthan Field and dispersed over the nearby mountains.

General Curtis E. LeMay said of Olds:

During my 35 years of service, I've been fortunate in coming in contact with... practically all (of the leaders) of the Air Force during that period, and we've had a great number of very good ones. All of them of course, have made an impact, not only with me, but on everyone else that was in the Air Force at the time. If I had to single out any one, I would say that Robert Olds made the greatest impact.

== Awards decorations, and honors ==
Maj. Gen. Robert Olds received the following awards and decorations:

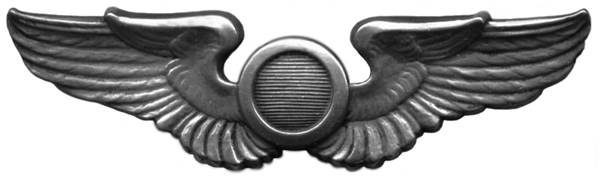
Command Pilot Combat Observer

Distinguished Service Medal

Distinguished Flying Cross

World War I Victory Medal

American Defense Service Medal

American Campaign Medal

World War II Victory Medal (posthumous)

Officer, Order of the Southern Cross (Brazil)

Olds received the 1938 Harmon Trophy, the 1939 Mackay Trophy on behalf of the 2nd Bomb Group's flight to Argentina, and the bronze medal of the International League of Aviators in 1941 for his "contribution to aviation" during the goodwill flights.

== Legacy ==
In April 1944, the USAAF acquired six Liberty ships for conversion to floating aircraft repair depots. The SS Daniel E. Garrett was renamed Major General Robert Olds. Operated by the Army Transport Service, it deployed to the Western Pacific in December 1944 as the base for the 1st Aircraft Repair Unit (Floating).

The Major General Robert Olds Award, sponsored by the United States Air Force's Air Mobility Command, is presented annually during graduation week at the United States Air Force Academy (USAFA) to the most outstanding graduating cadet majoring in International Affairs. The award, a sculpture of an eagle and fledglings, procured with AMC appropriated funds, is administered by the USAFA Cadet Awards Council.

== Notes ==
Footnotes

Citations
