= Harris Hull =

United States Air Force general

Harris B. Hull
- Born: May 23, 1909; Williamsburg, Iowa
- Died: January 29, 1993 (aged 83)
- Military career
- Allegiance: United States of America
- Branch: United States Air Force
- Rank: Brigadier General
- Unit: 8th Air Force
- Conflicts: World War II
- Awards: Legion of Merit; Bronze Star

Harris B. Hull (May 23, 1909 – January 29, 1993) was a brigadier general in the United States Air Force, and part of the original staff of the Eighth Air Force during the Second World War.

== Biography ==
Hull was born in 1909, in Williamsburg, Iowa to Harry E. Hull and Mary Louise Harris Hull. He graduated from the University of Pennsylvania Wharton School of Business of Economics with a Bachelor of Science degree in 1930.

He received a commission as a 2d lieutenant through the Reserve Officers' Training Corps program and, from August 1934 to January 1942, performed Army Reserve duty in New Jersey, New York and Washington, D.C., with the United States Army Air Corps. In April 1938, Hull was called to active duty with the 2nd Bombardment Group at Langley Field, Virginia, to help publicize the capabilities of the new B-17 Flying Fortress. He conceived the interception of the Italian ocean liner Rex over 600 miles at sea as part of a training exercise, and on May 12, 1938, flew on the lead bomber in what turned into a hazardous but highly successful mission.

Just prior to returning to active duty with the Army Air Corps Hull served in the Sperry Company as Assistant to the Vice-President.

Working as a journalist, Hull was called back into service in January 1942 to accompany Brig. Gen. Ira C. Eaker to England as his A-2, and served in both the Eighth Air Force and the Mediterranean theater as a combat intelligence officer during World War II. Hull was promoted through the ranks to colonel, and served most of his military career in that grade. In June 1944 he was transferred to the Mediterranean Allied Air Forces in Italy. In June 1944 he was a member of the initial mission of the Fifteenth Air Force to Russia.

In July 1945, he was assigned to Headquarters U.S. Army Air Forces in Washington, D.C., as chief of the Analyses Division. From November 1945 to November 1946, he was a special project officer in the Intelligence Directorate's Executive and Field Divisions. Hull served as the executive officer for the director of information at Army Air Forces headquarters from November 1946 to June 1947. When the Air Force became a separate service in 1947, he served in a similar position on the Air Force Information staff.

Transferring to the Office of the Air Force Inspector General, Hull served as the executive officer, from January 1948 to April 1950. After brief service as an Air Inspector for the 3894th School Squadron, with duty at the 1009th Special Weapons Squadron in Washington, D.C., Hull was named chief of the Current Intelligence Branch, Intelligence Directorate, at Air Force headquarters. Following graduation from the Air War College in June 1952, he joined Headquarters Command's 1007th Air Intelligence Service Group as an intelligence staff officer.

Hull became deputy for intelligence, Directorate of Intelligence, Headquarters Far East Air Forces, Fuchu Air Station, Japan, in June 1956. In July 1957, when the command became Pacific Air Forces and was relocated to Hickam Air Force Base, Hawaii, Hull was assigned as assistant chief of staff for intelligence.

Hull then was named deputy chief of staff for intelligence at North American Air Defense Command headquarters at Ent Air Force Base, Colorado and promoted to brigadier general May 4, 1960. He returned to Washington, D.C., in August 1963 as special assistant to the assistant administrator for technical policy, utilization and plans, National Aeronautics and Space Administration and retired August 1, 1964.

In 1969 he was awarded a patent (US3440635) for a radio press-button alarm, portable, car based or static, which sends a coded signal to tell receivers nearby the source of the alarum.

He had written numerous articles on military matters, most of them having been published in the Washington Post.

His military decorations and awards include the Legion of Merit with oak leaf cluster, Bronze Star, Air Medal, American Campaign Medal, European-African-Middle East Campaign Medal, World War II Victory Medal and National Defense Service Medal.

- Legion of Merit with oak leaf cluster
- Bronze Star
- Air Medal
- American Campaign Medal
- European-African-Middle Eastern Campaign Medal
- World War II Victory Medal
- National Defense Service Medal

Harris Hull died January 29, 1993.
