= Robert M. Webster =

United States Air Force general

Robert Morris Webster
- Major General Robert Morris Webster
- Born: October 19, 1892; Boston, Massachusetts
- Died: March 1, 1972 (aged 79)
- Burial place: Arlington National Cemetery
- Military career
- Allegiance: United States
- Branch: U.S. Army Air Service; U.S. Army Air Corps; U.S. Army Air Forces; United States Air Force
- Service years: 1918–1954
- Rank: Major General
- Commands: First Air Support Command, 1942 42d Bomb Wing, 1943; Allied Forces in Sardinia, 1944; United States/Free French 1st Tactical Air Force (provisional), 1945; Air Transport Command, European Division, 1945; Air Transport Command, 1946; First Air Force, 1947 Eastern Air Defense Force, 1949
- Conflicts: World War II
- Awards: Distinguished Service Medal (2); Legion of Merit; Air Medal (2); Silver Star

Robert Morris Webster (October 19, 1892 – March 1, 1972) was a United States Air Force major general who was an early advocate of daylight precision bombing as a war-winning strategy. A rated command pilot, he commanded a number of large air units during and after World War II and served as a senior military representative of the United States in foreign relations.

== Early career ==
Webster was born in Boston on October 19, 1892. He enlisted as a flying cadet on February 21, 1918. He attended the School of Military Aeronautics at Princeton University from March to June 1918 and was then assigned to Chanute Field, Illinois. He attended the Aerial Gunnery School at Carlstrom Field, Florida from October 1918 to February 1919. Webster was trained at the Instructors School at Kelly Field, Texas and was then assigned to the District Ordnance Office in Bridgeport, Connecticut, as an Army Reserve officer.

Webster was commissioned lieutenant in the United States Army Air Service in July 1920. In January 1921, Webster went to the Long Island Air Reserve Depot in New York. In March, he returned to Carlstrom Field, then moved to Brooks Field, Texas, in July 1922. After the formation of the United States Army Air Corps (USAAC) in July, Webster was assigned to the Philippines in October 1926—he served with the Second Observation Squadron at Nichols Field, and a month later was assigned to the Fourth Composite Group there. In December 1928, Webster became an instructor with the Connecticut National Guard at Hartford.

== Air Corps Tactical School ==
Webster entered the Air Corps Tactical School (ACTS) at Maxwell Field, Alabama, in August 1933. He graduated the following June and remained to serve as an instructor at the rank of captain. Webster taught within the Air Force Section of the school. For the next three years, Webster worked with other ACTS instructors—Harold L. George, Donald Wilson, Muir S. Fairchild, Haywood S. Hansell and Laurence S. Kuter—to determine how best to use precision bombing techniques that were under development to destroy small, vital enemy targets during the opening phase of a war, to hinder the enemy's potential to wage a lengthy war. Fairchild and Webster studied the interconnections between various industrial sectors of the United States to determine the most vulnerable nodes relative to attacking an enemy's industrial base. The two men compiled a list of critical targets that could incapacitate an enemy; targets that were organized with regard to available weapons. Webster wrote to a number of New York City and state agencies such as the National Board of Fire Underwriters, the Consolidated Gas Company and the New York City Board of Water Supply to determine the vulnerabilities of a large metropolitan area such as New York City. The resulting concept of points of vulnerability was called the industrial web theory.

Along with other young Air Corps officers Donald Wilson, Robert Olds, Kenneth Walker, Claire Chennault, and Harold L. George, Webster risked his career by advocating an independent Air Force in a speech he presented to the Howell Commission in 1934. Webster said:

Our most rigid and conventional institution has been the army. ... It has vigorously opposed every innovation in warfare, every contribution of science; it has held on to the pike when the muzzle loader was available; it held on to the muzzle loader when the breech loader was a fact ... In the Air Force we have the only agency with direct access to the fundamental objectives in war ... with a spirit that is immunized from the effects of army doctrine by a growing consciousness of its own independent power in war ... A casual survey of the evidence now available, must be convincing, that the creation of a separate and independent Air Force is the rational, simple, and inevitable solution to the problem.

Webster further asserted to the commission that "Ground officers were not aware of the fact that a properly organized attack, once launched in the air, cannot be stopped." The Howell Commission was impressed by the testimony of Webster and the young officers, and they drew up plans for the activation of GHQ Air Force, an interim solution one step closer to an independent air force.

On March 7, 1936, Webster was raised to the rank of major and was assigned chief of the Bombardment Section, ACTS, replacing Major Odas Moon who had been relieved of the position five weeks earlier. For the school year 1936–1937 Webster was named chief of the Air Force Section.

Webster entered the Command and General Staff School at Fort Leavenworth, Kansas in August 1937, was graduated the next June, and was The assigned in Washington, D.C., as chief of the Training Section in the Office of the Chief of Air Corps.

== World War II ==
United States became directly involved in World War II in December 1941 while Webster was stationed in Washington. Webster continued to work there to organize the massive training programs undertaken by the United States Army Air Forces (USAAF). Remaining in the nation's capital, in March 1942 Webster joined the Operations Division of the War Department General Staff. Webster was named commanding general of the First Air Support Command at Mitchel Field, New York, in August 1942. On October 2, 1942, Webster took command of the unit.

In April 1943, Webster assumed command of the 42nd Bomb Wing, a unit without men or aircraft. In the Mediterranean Theater of Operations, Webster supervised the incorporation of air groups in August. He took official command on August 24, 1943. Webster commanded the unit during its participation in the Allied invasion of Italy. In July 1944, he was appointed commander of the Allied Forces in Sardinia, Italy, and deputy commander of the 12th Air Force. Going to France in March 1945, Webster assumed command of the First Tactical Air Force, a provisional unit made up of both Free French and American units.

In July 1945, Webster joined the Air Transport Command, and in August assumed command of its European Division in Paris, France. The day after Victory in Europe Day, Webster joined with General Ned Sohramm and men of the 6th Army Group and the First Tactical Air Force (provisional) at a Roman Catholic cathedral in Heidelberg, Germany, to celebrate victory.

== Post-war career ==
In July 1946, Webster was named deputy commander of Air Transport Command, based at Gravelly Point, Virginia. On September 20, 1946, he assumed command. On February 10, 1947, Webster addressed the National War College with a lecture about the planning of air transportation for war. On July 16, 1947, Webster was transferred to Fort Slocum, New York, where he became commanding general of the First Air Force. During this time, the United States Air Force (USAF) was chartered from the former USAAF. Webster assumed command of the Eastern Air Defense Force, a part of the Continental Air Command, at Mitchel Air Force Base in New York, in September 1949. In this role, Webster presented the Amelia Earhart Scholarship to Virginia L. Sweet, a WASP aviator, in late 1949.

In June 1950, Webster was appointed chief of the Air Section, Joint Brazil-U.S. Military Commission, at Rio de Janeiro, Brazil. Moving to USAF Headquarters, Washington, D.C., on January 22, 1953, Webster was designated Air Force and Steering and Coordinating Member for Military Representation, U.S. Sections, of the Permanent Joint Board on Defense, Canada-U.S. (relieved April 30, 1954) and the Joint Mexico-U.S. Defense Commission. The following month he received additional duty as director of the U.S. Defense Planning Group; Senior USAF Delegate to the U.S. Delegation of the Inter-American Defense Board; and Senior USAF Delegate on the Joint Brazil-U.S. Defense Commission. Webster retired from the USAF on October 31, 1954. Webster died on March 1, 1972, and was buried at Arlington National Cemetery. His wife, Flora Bitzer Webster, was buried in the same plot in 1978.

== Recognition ==
His decorations include the Distinguished Service Medal with oak leaf cluster, Legion of Merit, Silver Star, and Air Medal with oak leaf cluster.

== Effective dates of promotion ==
- Second lieutenant - 1918
- First lieutenant - July 1, 1920
- Captain - October 1, 1934
- Major (temporary) - March 7, 1936
- Major (permanent) - July 1, 1940
- Lieutenant colonel (temporary) - July 15, 1941
- Lieutenant colonel (permanent) - December 11, 1942
- Colonel (temporary) - February 1, 1943
- Brigadier general (temporary) - September 18, 1943
- Major general (temporary) - November 9, 1944
- Major general (permanent) - February 19, 1948, backdated to December 20, 1942

== See also ==
- Bomber Mafia
