= Donald Wilson (general) =

United States Army Air Forces general (1892–1978

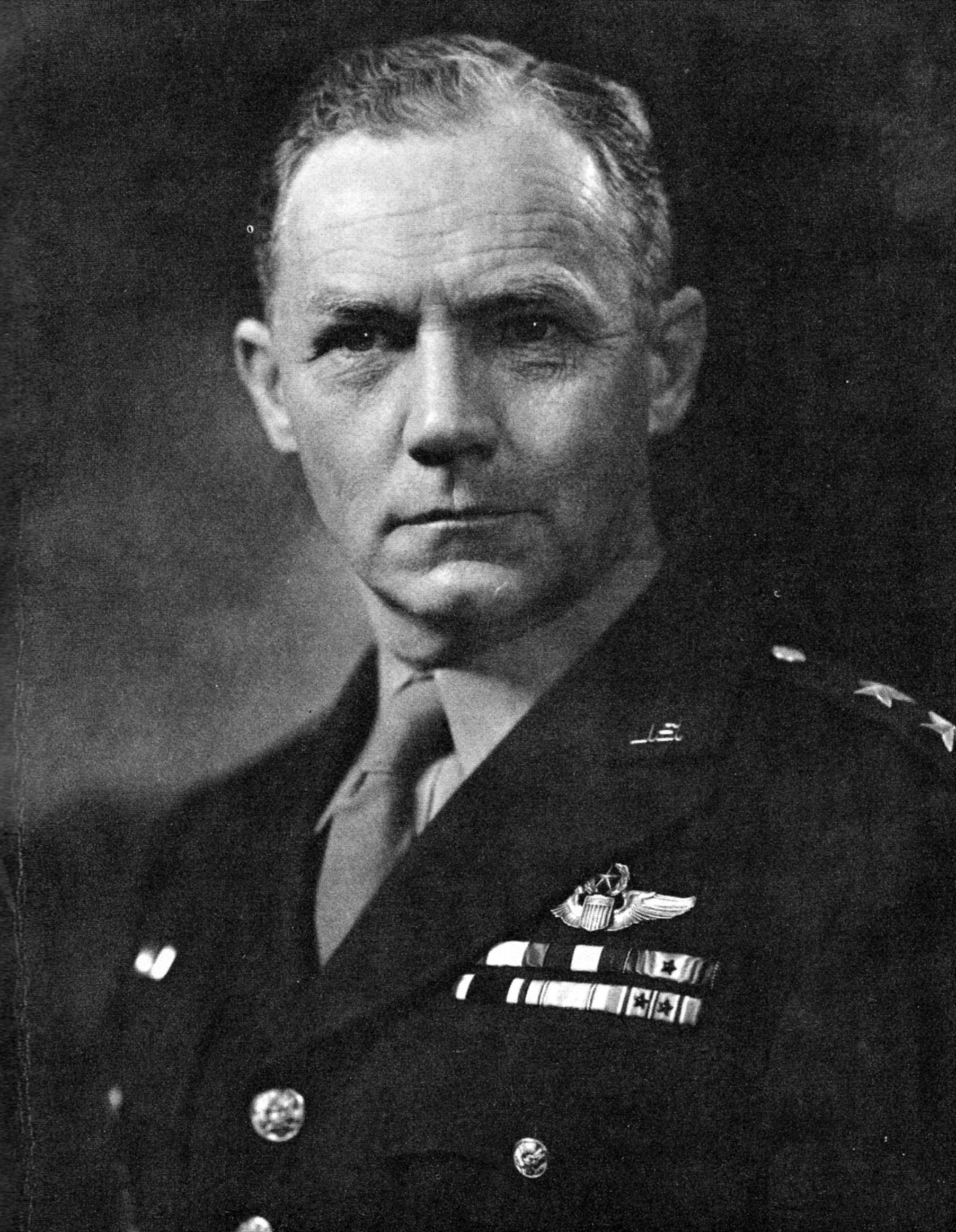
- Major General Donald Wilson
- Born: September 25, 1892; Hiner's Mill, Pendleton County, West Virginia, US
- Died: June 21, 1978 (aged 85)
- Burial place: Arlington National Cemetery Virginia
- Military career
- Allegiance: United States
- Branch: United States Army
- Service years: 1916–1947
- Rank: Major General
- Commands: 2nd Observation Squadron; Air Force Center Command
- Conflicts: Mexican Border War; World War I; Western Front; World War II; New Guinea campaign; Philippines Campaign (1944–45); Battle of Iwo Jima
- Awards: Distinguished Service Medal (2)

Donald Wilson (25 September 1892 – 21 June 1978) was a United States Army Air Forces general during World War II.

Wilson enlisted in the Maryland National Guard as a private in 1916 and served with it on the Mexican border and the Western Front during World War I before transferring to the United States Army Air Service. After the war, he obtained a regular commission. Already qualified as an aerial observer, he became a pilot in 1922. For many years he was an influential instructor at the Air Corps Tactical School. Wilson became a leading theorist who embraced the doctrine that strategic bombing was the most important aspect of air power. He argued that by attacking vulnerabilities, whole industries could be brought to a halt without necessarily having to destroy all of the factories. The doctrine which Wilson expounded later became the basis for AWPD-1, the Army Air Forces' strategic war plan developed in 1941.

During World War II, Wilson served as Chief of the Personnel Division (G-l) of the War Department General Staff. He became Chief of Staff of the Fifth Air Force in September 1942, before returning to the United States in 1944 to become Assistant Chief of Staff, United States Army Air Forces for Organization, Commitments and Requirements. For a time he was acting Chief of Staff of Army Air Forces. In February 1945, Wilson was present at the Battle of Iwo Jima as an official Army Air Forces observer. In June 1945, he assumed command of the Air Force Proving Ground Command.

After the war, Wilson served as a member of the Gerow Board, which examined the military educational system and instituted a series of long-lasting reforms. In 1947, he was diagnosed with neurasthenia, and retired with the rank of major general.

== Early life ==
Donald Wilson was born at Hiner's Mill in Pendleton County, West Virginia on 25 September 1892, the third of seven children of John Hamilton Wilson and his wife Martha Jane, née Siple. John Wilson worked a number of odd jobs before becoming a mail carrier with the Baltimore Post Office in 1899. Donald was educated at Baltimore Polytechnic Institute. In 1910, he went to work as a surveyor for the Baltimore and Ohio Railroad.

== World War I ==
In February 1916, Wilson enlisted as a private in the Maryland National Guard and was posted to Company H, 5th Maryland Infantry. This unit was called to active duty at Laurel, Maryland in June 1916 for service on the Mexican border. It was based at Eagle Pass, Texas, and, like most National Guard units, supported but did not directly participate in the Pancho Villa Expedition, although it did occasionally cross the border into Mexico. Wilson was soon promoted to corporal, and later sergeant. The 5th Maryland Regiment returned to Maryland in February 1917.

The 5th Maryland Infantry was again called up in April 1917 following the declaration of war by the United States on the German Empire. Wilson was promoted to second lieutenant, effective 9 April 1917. He was posted to Company C, 5th Maryland Infantry. This time, the regiment moved to Camp McClellan, Alabama, where the 5th Maryland Infantry was absorbed into the 115th Infantry of the 29th Division on 1 October 1917. While at Camp McClellan, Wilson applied for training as an aerial observer but his request was not accepted. He was promoted to first lieutenant on 23 April 1918.

In June 1918, the 29th Division sailed from Hoboken, New Jersey to Brest, France. It travelled across France, entering the front line trenches in the Traubach-le-Bas sector. In France, Wilson once again applied for training as an aerial observer, in response to an appeal from American Expeditionary Forces (AEF) headquarters. This time, he was successful and in September 1918 he reported to the Air Service Concentration Barracks at Saint-Maixent. After training there, at Camp de Souge, and at Tours in November 1918, he was posted to the 2nd Corps Aeronautical School at Châtillon-sur-Seine. He was assigned to the 186th Aero Squadron at Weißenthurm (Weissenthurm) in May 1919, returned to the United States in July, and was discharged from the Army on 15 August 1919.

== Between the wars ==
Wilson married Edna Taggert, the older sister of the wife of his best friend in Anniston, in a ceremony in her home in Pittsburgh. After a honeymoon in Miami, Florida, they settled in Baltimore. The couple eventually had two children: Teresa Jane, born in 1921, and Donald, born in 1923.

In 1920, Wilson applied for and received a Regular Army commission in the Air Service, into which he was commissioned as a first lieutenant on 1 July 1920. He was immediately advanced to captain and posted to the Observation School at Post Field, Oklahoma as a senior instructor. In 1922, he was sent to Carlstrom Field, Florida for primary pilot training and then to Kelly Field, Texas for advanced training. He also served there as an instructor in observation. From 1924 to 1927, he served in Washington, DC, in the Office of the Chief of the Air Service. This was followed by a two-year tour of duty in the Philippines as commander of the 2nd Observation Squadron.

On return to the United States in 1929, Wilson was posted to the Air Corps Tactical School at Langley Field, Virginia as an instructor. In 1931 the school moved to Maxwell Field, Alabama, where he was promoted to major on 1 February 1932. At the Air Corps Tactical School, Wilson became "one of the leading theorists ... during the thirties". Like Giulio Douhet, the school embraced the doctrine that strategic bombing was the most important aspect of air power. However, Wilson rejected those parts of Douhet's doctrine that called for mass bombing of cities to break the morale of the enemy.

Instead, in preparing the training course, Wilson drew on his knowledge that critical breaks in railroad systems could disrupt the entire system. He theorized that this was equally true of other industries, that by attacking vulnerabilities, whole industries could be brought to a halt without necessarily having to destroy all the factories. The school identified transportation, steel, iron ore, and electric power as key economic industries. Wilson termed this doctrine "industrial web theory".

The formulators of industrial web theory were relatively young junior officers, nearly all of them former reservists commissioned during or immediately after World War I. They viewed war in the abstract and admitted that they had no conclusive proof of their theories, but firmly believed that air power would dominate future warfare, after certain technological limitations had been overcome. Wilson was one of the nine key advocates, all instructors at the Tactical School, who became known as the "Bomber Mafia": Wilson, Walker, Major Odas Moon (who died in 1937), and future generals Haywood S. Hansell, Laurence Kuter, Muir Fairchild, Robert Olds, Robert M. Webster, and Harold L. George. They espoused the doctrine in testimony to the Howell Commission on Federal Aviation in 1934, where it was used as an argument supporting the creation of an independent air force.

Once adopted as doctrine, industrial web theory had a host of effects. To obtain the required accuracy to hit pinpoint targets, bombing had to be done by daylight. An improved bombsight was required: the Norden bombsight Mark XV, appearing in 1931. Since a pursuit plane did not have the range to accompany the bombers, they had to be able to defend themselves, and new tactics called for formation flying to maximize the defense against hostile pursuit aircraft. The requirement for a better bomber led to the development of the Boeing B-17 Flying Fortress. Wilson accepted the argument, most forcibly advanced by fellow instructor Kenneth Walker, that fighter aircraft did not have the range or speed to accompany bombers and probably could not shoot them down.

Wilson attended the Command and General Staff School at Fort Leavenworth, Kansas, graduating in June 1934. He considered the course to be a waste of time, "devoted in large part to the minutiae of ground officers' duties" and "devoid of serious recognition of the airplane as an instrument of war." After graduation he returned to the Air Corps Tactical School as Director of the Department of Air Tactics and Strategy, and was promoted to lieutenant colonel on 16 June 1936. From November 1938 to March 1939, he was also assistant commandant of the school.

== World War II ==
Wilson was promoted to colonel on 16 October 1940. He returned to Washington, DC, where he served in the Office of the Chief of the Air Corps under Brigadier General Carl A. Spaatz, the chief of its Plans Division. In May 1940, he was transferred to the Plans Division of the War Department General Staff, which was headed by Brigadier General Leonard T. Gerow. Wilson was briefly chief of staff of Major General Walter H. Frank's Third Air Force in Tampa, Florida but after only two months he was recalled to Washington to again serve on the War Department General Staff, this time in the G-1 (Personnel) Division, which was headed by Major General John H. Hilldring, a Command and General Staff School classmate. Wilson was promoted to brigadier general on 22 June 1942. In July 1942, Hilldring left to take over command of the 84th Infantry Division and Wilson became Assistant Chief of Staff, G-1.

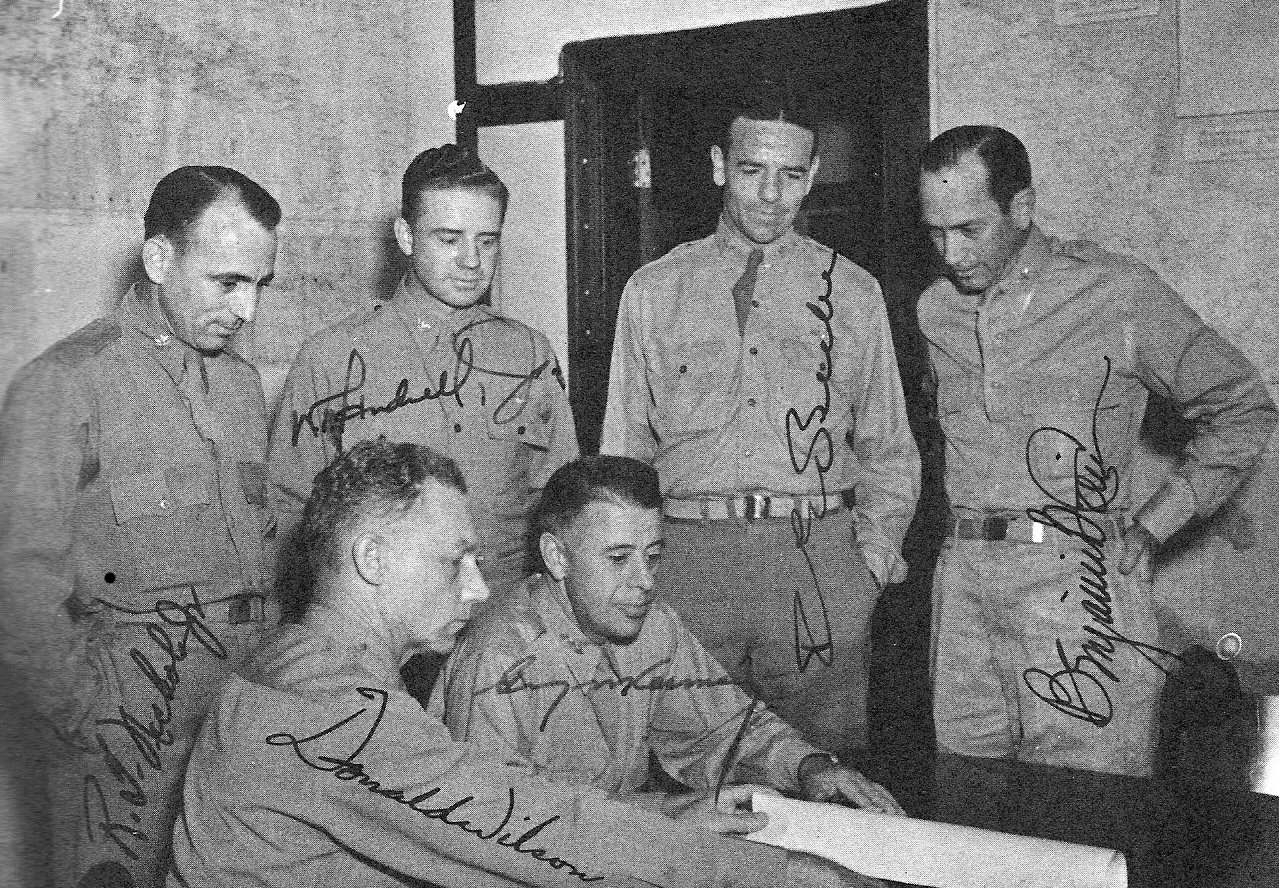
General George Kenney and his staff. Donald Wilson is in the foreground.

In September 1942, Wilson became chief of staff of Major General George Kenney's Allied Air Forces, Southwest Pacific Area and Fifth Air Force. Kenney had specifically requested General Henry Arnold to send Wilson to replace his chief of staff, Air Vice Marshal William Bostock, an RAAF officer. Wilson had known Kenney for many years and was on a first name basis with him; but while serving as his chief of staff, Wilson always addressed Kenney respectfully as "general". The loss of Brigadier General Kenneth N. Walker over Rabaul in January 1943 and then his successor, Brigadier General Howard K. Ramey on a reconnaissance mission in March did not dampen Wilson's desire to accompany a mission, and he tagged along as a passenger on a B-24 on a bombing raid on Rabaul. For his service in the Southwest Pacific, Wilson was awarded the Distinguished Service Medal.

In March 1944, Arnold asked for Kenney to return Wilson to work on his own staff. Wilson took the long way back, visiting the other war theatres in India, China, the Middle East, Italy and England. Wilson found the Army Air Forces Chief of Staff, Lieutenant General Barney Giles anxious for Wilson's return so Giles could pay a visit to the war theatres. Wilson therefore found himself acting chief of staff. On Giles' return, Wilson became Assistant Chief of Staff, Organization, Commitments and Requirements. In February 1945, Wilson was present at the Battle of Iwo Jima as an official Army Air Forces observer. He was promoted to major general on 17 March 1945.

On 25 June 1945, Wilson was replaced as assistant chief of staff by Major General Hoyt Vandenberg. For his service in the post, Wilson was awarded an oak leaf cluster to his Distinguished Service Medal. He was appointed to command the Air Force Proving Ground Command. At the time, some 22,000 airmen were assigned to this command.

== Post war ==
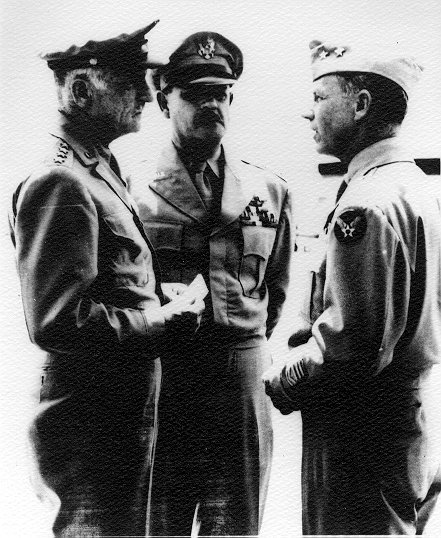
From left, General Carl A. Spaatz, Commanding General, Army Air Forces; Major General Muir S. Fairchild, Air University commander; and Major General Donald M. Wilson, Commanding General, Air Proving Ground Command, talk following the Air University dedication ceremony at Maxwell Field on 3 September 1946.

Wilson served as a member of the Gerow Board, under his former chief, Lieutenant General Leonard T. Gerow, which examined the military educational system. The board met in Washington, DC, between 3 and 12 January 1946. Its final report to the Chief of Staff of the United States Army, General of the Army Dwight D. Eisenhower, recommended a system of five joint colleges, which would collectively form a National Security University under the direction of the Joint Chiefs of Staff. In addition to the existing Industrial College and National War College, the board recommended the establishment of a joint administrative college, a joint intelligence college, and a Department of State college. Wilson went further and argued for the establishment of an air university, under the control of the Army Air Forces. Wilson's proposal was accepted, and the Gerow Board's recommendations resulted in a multi-tiered educational system still in effect today, with a Squadron Officer School for junior officers; an Air Command and Staff College for middle level officers; and an Air University for senior officers. All were created from the old Air Corps Tactical School. Beyond that, air officers would have to participate in joint training with their Army and Navy colleagues at the Industrial College, National War College and Joint Forces Staff College, the last two being creations of the Gerow Board. The first classes began at these two new institutions in September 1946 and January 1947 respectively.

In October 1946, Wilson was diagnosed with neurasthenia. Discharged on the grounds of disability with the rank of major general, he retired to Carmel, California, where he wrote and published his memoirs, entitled Wooing Peponi, in 1973. He died on 21 June 1978. His papers are in The George C. Marshall Foundation.
