= Industrial web theory =

Military theory

Industrial web theory is the military concept that an enemy's industrial power can be attacked at nodes of vulnerability, and thus the enemy's ability to wage a lengthy war can be severely limited, as well as his morale—his will to resist. The theory was formulated by American airmen at the Air Corps Tactical School (ACTS) in the 1930s.

The term "industrial web theory" cannot be found in any official United States Army Air Corps (USAAC) doctrine. Instead, the term was coined in the 1930s by Donald Wilson, an instructor at ACTS, to cover the concept then under development.

== Theory ==
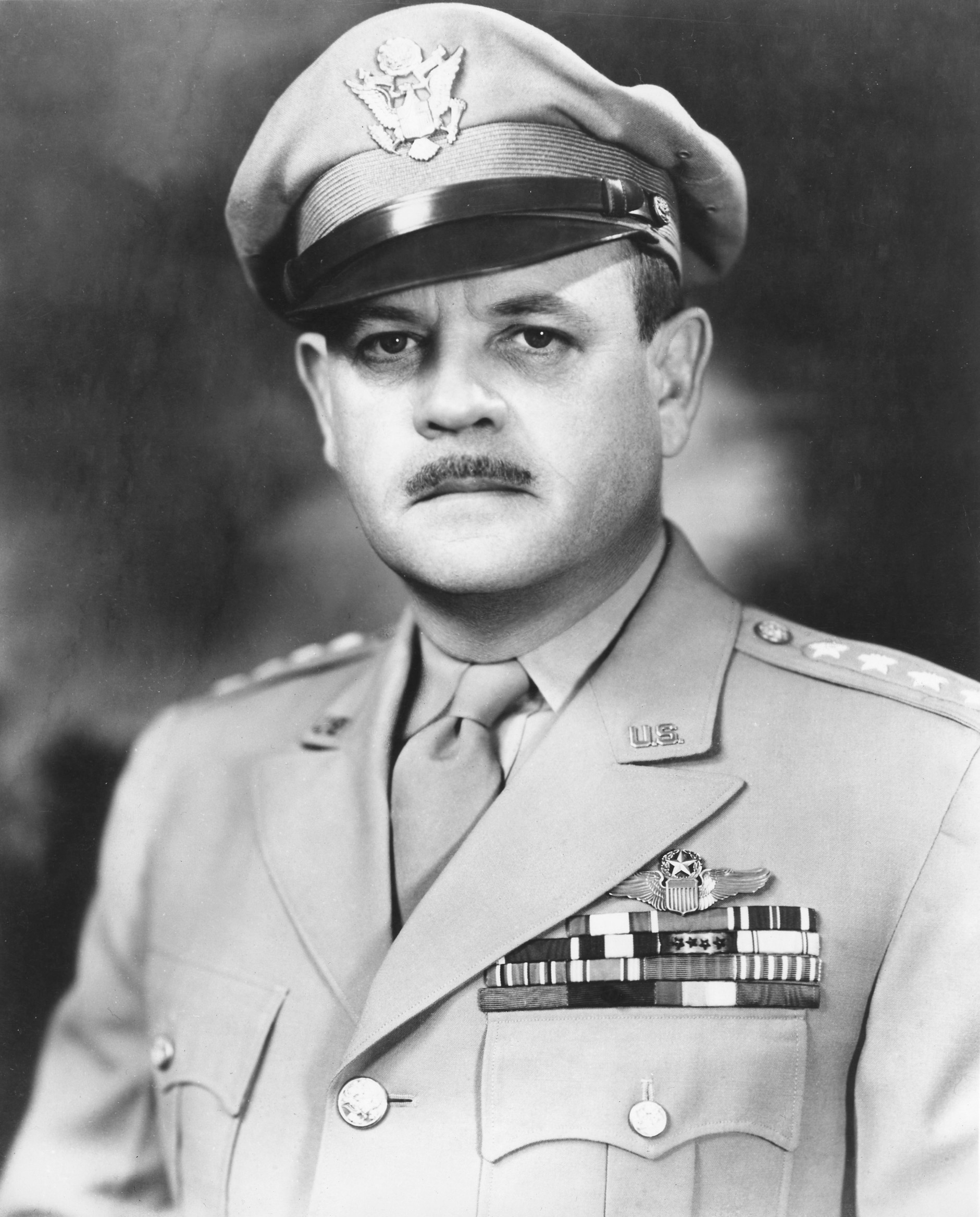
Muir S. Fairchild researched industrial interconnections.

Prior theories of bombing were developed by Italian General Giulio Douhet, British Sir Hugh Trenchard and American Colonel Billy Mitchell, each of whom advocated bombing an enemy's population centers as a method of shortening wars and thus saving more lives than were taken. This theory of area bombardment was taught at ACTS until 1934 but was unpopular in the press and in government. In 1922, a treaty to limit aerial bombardment of civilians was written and promoted by the United States, called The Hague Rules of Air Warfare, but it was not adopted. A similar international proposal was drafted in Tokyo in 1934 regarding the "Protection of Civilian Persons in Time of War," but this, too, was not ratified by treaty.

In 1935, ACTS instructors studied the probable results of area bombardment and concluded that not enough economic damage resulted from attacks on civilian population centers. Mitchell and the ACTS adjusted their bombing strategy to avoid direct attacks on civilians to be "more in keeping with our humanitarian ideals," though the possibility of attacks on general population centers was retained as a "last resort."

The industrial web theory was based on the idea that the economic strength of an industrial nation is composed of interdependent sectors such as manufacturing, mining, utilities and transportation. Any one of the sectors could be targeted with bombs to make the whole system suffer breakdowns and shortages. From 1935, instructors such as Robert M. Webster and Muir S. Fairchild at ACTS studied the industrial interdependence of the United States as a model for targeting an aggressor enemy state. They drew up lists of optimal targets that would produce the greatest disruption for the least expenditure of bombs. Transportation and electric power industries were seen as vital targets, as well as iron ore mining and steel manufacturing.

Robert M. Webster listed iron ore, steel, electricity and transportation as appropriate targets.

With the loss of an enemy's economic strength through crippling attack on a vital sector, the theory held that the enemy's will to fight would collapse and that they would surrender or be forced to the bargaining table.

In 1934, six ACTS leaders appeared before the Howell Commission to advocate for an independent military air arm for the United States. Webster was joined by Donald Wilson, Robert Olds, Kenneth Walker, Claire Chennault, and Harold L. George—all six spoke about the critical opportunity that could be taken in attacking the cohesiveness of an enemy's industrial web. George submitted his opinion that a bomber with a 3,000-mile (4,800 km) range would be available within two years. The Howell Commission (which would develop into the Federal Aviation Commission and then into the Federal Aviation Administration) was interested in the industrial web theory and in the possibility that an independent air arm might stop an enemy from making war. They authorized the General Headquarters Air Force (GHQ Air Force) as a semi-independent arm within the United States Army.

=== Industrial targets ===
Traditional military targets had primarily been fielded enemy forces and concentrations of supplies held in rear areas. After aerial bombardment became a possibility, tactical targets such as communications (supply and signal lines) and troop concentrations became the focus of bombing efforts. The industrial web theory instead targeted choke points and bottlenecks in an enemy's economic and industrial base, deep inside the interior of an enemy nation. If precision bombing could be used to destroy an industrial node with resulting paralysis of enemy industry, the particular node was given serious consideration as a target.

Suitable targets included railroad lines, junctions and marshaling areas, oil drilling and fuel refining industries, iron ore mining and transportation, steel refining and manufacturing industries, electric power generation and distribution, and, in general, all forms of transportation.

=== Enemy morale ===
A hold-over element of area bombardment strategies that was incorporated into the industrial web theory was that enemy morale would deteriorate in the face of bombing attacks that vitally reduced an enemy's economy. The enemy's will to resist would fail, and the enemy would surrender or would at least be forced to end the war by diplomatic means. In 1939, Fairchild said of a theoretical enemy that the "nation-wide reaction to the stunning discovery that the sources of the country's power to resist and to sustain itself are being relentlessly destroyed, can hardly fail to be decisive."

== Weapons development ==
Before the development of aerial warfare, especially the long-range heavy bomber, large-scale attacks on an enemy's industrial might were impossible. No military weapon system was able to penetrate deep into enemy territory and reliably deliver the quantity of munitions required to limit the enemy's ability to wage war. Zeppelin raids during World War I came near to achieving this capability—their bomb load and range were greater than any other aircraft—but they were very vulnerable to weather and attack.

Bombers and Zeppelins in World War I proved vulnerable to pursuit aircraft, so each of the belligerents quickly moved to a strategy of bombing at night when the attackers were much safer. However, night bombing suffered from imprecision in targeting. As early as 1926, American airmen noted that small targets which were difficult to see at night would have to be attacked in daylight hours. Still, night bombing was emphasized. In 1932, the staff at ACTS moved to embrace daylight bombing as the primary method to get the greatest bomb tonnage on target. To survive this kind of risky offensive action, the bombers would have to be flying higher than their pursuers, and higher than the effective range of anti-aircraft artillery. ACTS bombing proponents began calling for higher service ceilings for their bombers: 15,000 feet (4,600 m) for light bombers and 18,000 feet (5,500 m) for the heavy bombers.

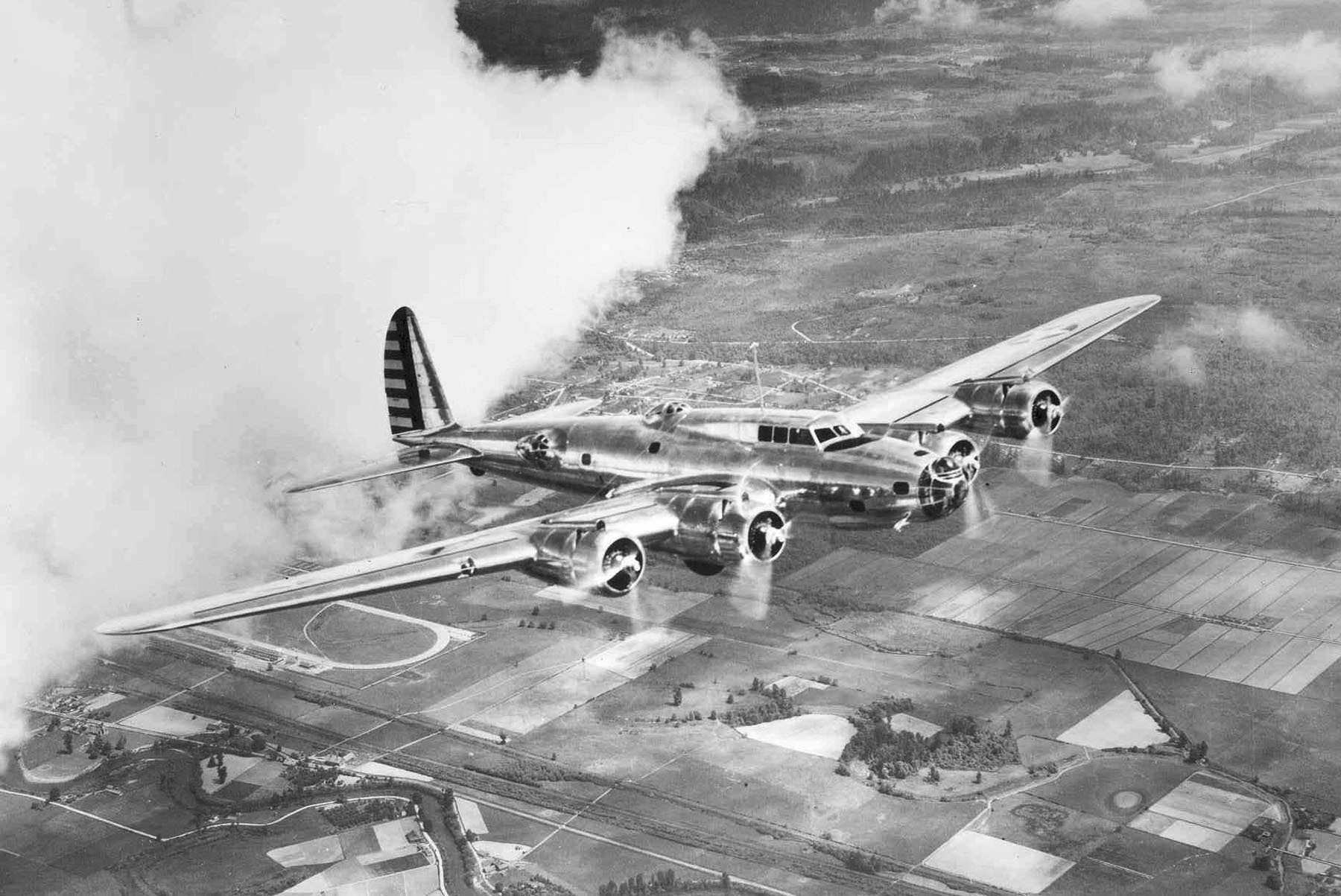
Y1B-17 Flying Fortress service test aircraft undergoing trials

As well, bomber strategy began to emphasize the mutually supporting defensive fire of multiple machine guns found within a squadron of bombers flying in close formation. It was thought that bombers in formation were too difficult a target for defensive aircraft. Kenneth Walker lectured to his students in the Bombardment Section of ACTS: "Military airmen of all nations agree that a determined air attack, once launched, is most difficult, if not impossible to stop."

With the first successful trials of the Y1B-17 Flying Fortress service test aircraft in 1937, the ACTS was convinced that this aircraft could prove their theories. The new bomber could fly above 35,000 feet (10,700 m), was faster and could carry a larger bomb load than any previous bomber. Its potential for use against targets deep within an enemy nation was far greater than any previous aircraft. These qualities combined with its massive amount of defensive firepower brought ACTS theorists to conclude that the B-17 bomber fleet was invincible, that it was indeed true that "The bomber will always get through", a phrase uttered in 1932 by Stanley Baldwin, 1st Earl Baldwin of Bewdley.

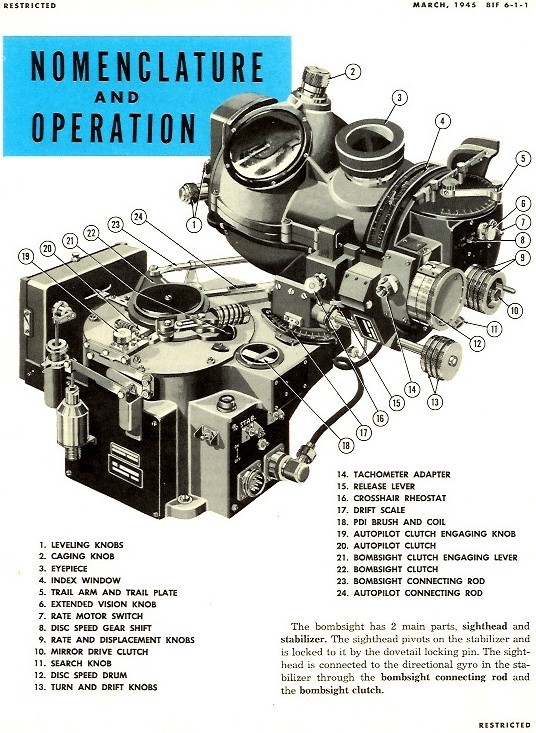
An instructional diagram of the Norden bombsight

With increasing altitude, the circular error of probability (CEP) also increased, resulting in decreased damage to the target. Bombs dropped from high altitudes would fall over a wide area below, and in order for the bombers to significantly damage a target, the number of bombers would have to be prohibitively large. The Norden bombsight, tested in 1933, held the promise of much greater accuracy in high altitude bombing, and helped the ACTS theorists conclude that pinpoint bombing was possible.

== Results ==
The industrial web theory was put into concrete plan form by the Air War Plans Division: Kenneth Walker, Laurence S. Kuter and Haywood S. Hansell, led by Harold L. George. The plan was submitted for approval to the Joint Army-Navy Board in mid-1941 as AWPD-1, standing for Air War Plans Division, plan number one. A refinement to AWPD-1 came in August 1942 after eight months of direct American involvement in World War II. The new plan was called AWPD-42 and was submitted to the Combined Chiefs of Staff. Neither AWPD-1 nor AWPD-42 were approved as combat battle plans or strategies—they were simply accepted as guidelines for the production of materiel necessary to carry out the plans intended or subsequent plans. Finally in 1943, a plan was hammered out in meetings between American and British war planners. The industrial web theory would be put into practical plan form with the Anglo-American Combined Bomber Offensive (CBO).

In the event, the industrial web theory failed to achieve its goals. Various targets were chosen and attacked serially, without evaluating the results in light of their interdependence. American bombing leaders maintained that precision attacks were being carried out, but in early 1944 poor weather over Europe prevented visual sighting, and bombs were dropped indiscriminately by inaccurate radar methods through cloud cover, resulting in general population destruction. By September 1944, all pretense to precision was abandoned when General Dwight D. Eisenhower ordered the area bombing of Berlin. By that time, bombing had become as much tactical as strategic, to soften Germany for invasion by ground troops. Thousand-bomber raids were not able to diminish industrial production of materiel in time to prevent invasion. When arms production in Germany finally faltered in the third quarter of 1944, only 30% of the total of eventual bomb tonnage had been dropped on the country—this after the French-German border had been reached and the war on the ground had seen its decisive breakthrough. Germany was conquered by invasion; it did not surrender solely because of bombing. The morale of the enemy was not significantly affected—no population that was bombed in World War II lost their will to resist, and it was the Emperor, not the people, who decided Japan must surrender.

Despite its failures in practice, the strategic bombing concept of targeting crucial industrial bottlenecks became in 1947 the first core doctrine of the independent United States Air Force. Strategic bombing proponents continued to promote the doctrine into the nuclear age, forming the Strategic Air Command to carry out a vision modified to fit the needs of the Cold War and the threat of nuclear warfare.

In the modern United States, Air Force strategic doctrine was redirected in the 1980s by Colonel John A. Warden III who developed his Strategic Ring Theory, a concept of aerial attack in which a number of enemy nodes are attacked simultaneously to result in "physical paralysis" or "strategic paralysis." Warden's theory added fielded enemy military units and their leadership to the industrial web theory, and attacks on civilians were at most indirect ones, collateral damage, the result of targeted military and industrial nodes. However, USAF doctrine continues to emphasize the demoralization of the enemy: "Strategic attack objectives often include producing effects to demoralize the enemy’s leadership, military forces, and population, thus affecting an adversary’s capability to continue the conflict."

== See also ==
- Aerial bombardment and international law
- Bomber mafia
- Dehousing, British area bombardment doctrine
- Strategic bombing during World War II
