= Precision bombing =

Bombing technique

Precision bombing is the attempted aerial bombing of a target with some degree of accuracy, with the aim of maximising target damage or limiting collateral damage. Its strategic counterpart is carpet bombing. An example would be destroying a single building in a built up area causing minimal damage to the surroundings. Precision bombing was initially tried by both the Allied and Central Powers during World War I, however it was found to be ineffective because the technology did not allow for sufficient accuracy. Therefore, the air forces turned to area bombardment, which killed civilians. Since the War, the development and adoption of guided munitions has greatly increased the accuracy of aerial bombing. Because the accuracy achieved in bombing is dependent on the available technology, the "precision" of precision bombing is relative to the time period.

Precision has always been recognized as an important attribute of weapon development. The noted military theorist, strategist, and historian Major-General J. F. C. Fuller, considered "accuracy of aim" one of the five recognizable attributes of weaponry, together with range of action, striking power, volume of fire, and portability.

== World War II ==
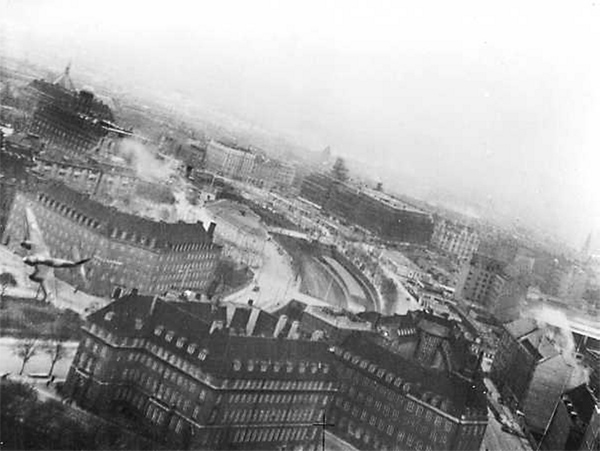
Precision bombing of the Gestapo-headquarters in the Shellhus, Copenhagen, Denmark in March 1945. A Mosquito pulling away from its bombing run is visible on the extreme left, centre

In the early days of World War II, bombers were expected to strike by daylight and deliver accurately in order to avoid civilian casualties. Cloud cover and industrial haze frequently obscured targets so bomb release was made by dead reckoning from the last navigational "fix"—the bombers dropping their loads according to the ETA for the target. Some airforces soon found that daylight bombing resulted in heavy losses since fighter interception became easy and switched to night bombing. This allowed the bombers a better chance of survival, but made it much harder to even find the general area of the target, let alone drop bombs precisely.

The Luftwaffe addressed this issue first by using a series of radio beams to direct aircraft and indicate when to drop bombs. Several different techniques were tried, including Knickebein, X-Gerät and Y-Gerät (Wotan). These provided impressive accuracy—British post-raid analysis showed that the vast majority of the bombs dropped could be placed within 100 yards (91 m) of the midline of the beam, spread along it a few hundred yards around the target point, even in pitch-dark conditions at a range of several hundred miles. But the systems fatally depended on accurate radio reception, and the British invented the first electronic warfare techniques to successfully counter this weapon in the 'Battle of the Beams'

The RAF later developed their own beam guidance techniques, such as GEE and Oboe. These systems could provide an accuracy of about 100 yards radius, and were supplemented by the downward-looking radar system H2S. The British development of specialist 'Earthquake' bombs (which needed to be dropped very accurately) led to the development of supporting aiming techniques such as SABS and the Pathfinder Force. Specialist units such as 617 squadron were able to use these and other techniques to achieve remarkable precision, such as the bombing of the Michelin factory at Clermont-Ferrand in France, where they were required to destroy the workshops but leave the canteen next to them standing.

By 1941, precision day bombing had become the dominant doctrine in the US Army Air Corps. As war with Germany loomed, Air War Plans Division Plan No. 1 (AWPD-1), a detailed plan for the entire US Army Air Forces (USAAF), was drafted by four officers who had been proponents of precision bombing at the Air Corps Tactical School: Lt. Col. Harold L. George, Lt. Col. Kenneth N. Walker, Maj. Haywood S. Hansell Jr., and Maj. Laurence S. Kuter. AWPD-1 prescribed an emphasis on precision bombing against the German national infrastructure, industry—especially the aircraft industry—and the Luftwaffe.

For the USAAF, daylight bombing was normal based upon box formations for defense from fighters. Bombing was coordinated through a lead aircraft but although still nominally precision bombing (as opposed to the area bombing carried out by RAF Bomber Command) the result of bombing from high level was still spread over an area. Before the war on practice ranges, some USAAF crews were able to produce very accurate results, but over Europe with weather and German fighters and anti-aircraft guns and the limited training for new crews this level of accuracy was impossible to reproduce. The US defined the target area as being a 1,000 ft (300 m) radius circle around the target point - for the majority of USAAF attacks only about 20% of the bombs dropped struck in this area. The U.S. daytime bombing raids were more effective in reducing German defences by engaging the German Luftwaffe than destruction of the means of aircraft production.

An example of the difficulties of precision bombing was a raid in the Northern Hemisphere summer of 1944 by 47 B-29's on Japan's Yawata Steel Works from bases in China. Only one plane actually hit the target area, and only with one of its bombs. This single 500 lb (230 kg) general-purpose bomb represented one quarter of one percent of the 376 bombs dropped over Yawata on that mission. It took 108 B-17 bombers, crewed by 1,080 airmen, dropping 648 bombs to guarantee a 96 percent chance of getting just two hits inside a 400 x 500 ft (150 m) German power-generation plant.

== See also ==
- Surgical strike
- Laser-guided bomb
- Precision-guided munition
- Revolution in Military Affairs
- Bomber Mafia
