= General Webster =

General Webster may refer to:

- George D. Webster (USMC) (1919–1992), U.S. Marine Corps brigadier general
- Joseph Dana Webster (1811–1876), Union Army brigadier general and brevet major general
- Robert M. Webster (1892–1972), U.S. Air Force major general
- William G. Webster (born 1951), U.S. Army lieutenant general

== See also ==
- Attorney General Webster (disambiguation)
