= The bomber will always get through =

1932 phrase by British politician Stanley Baldwin

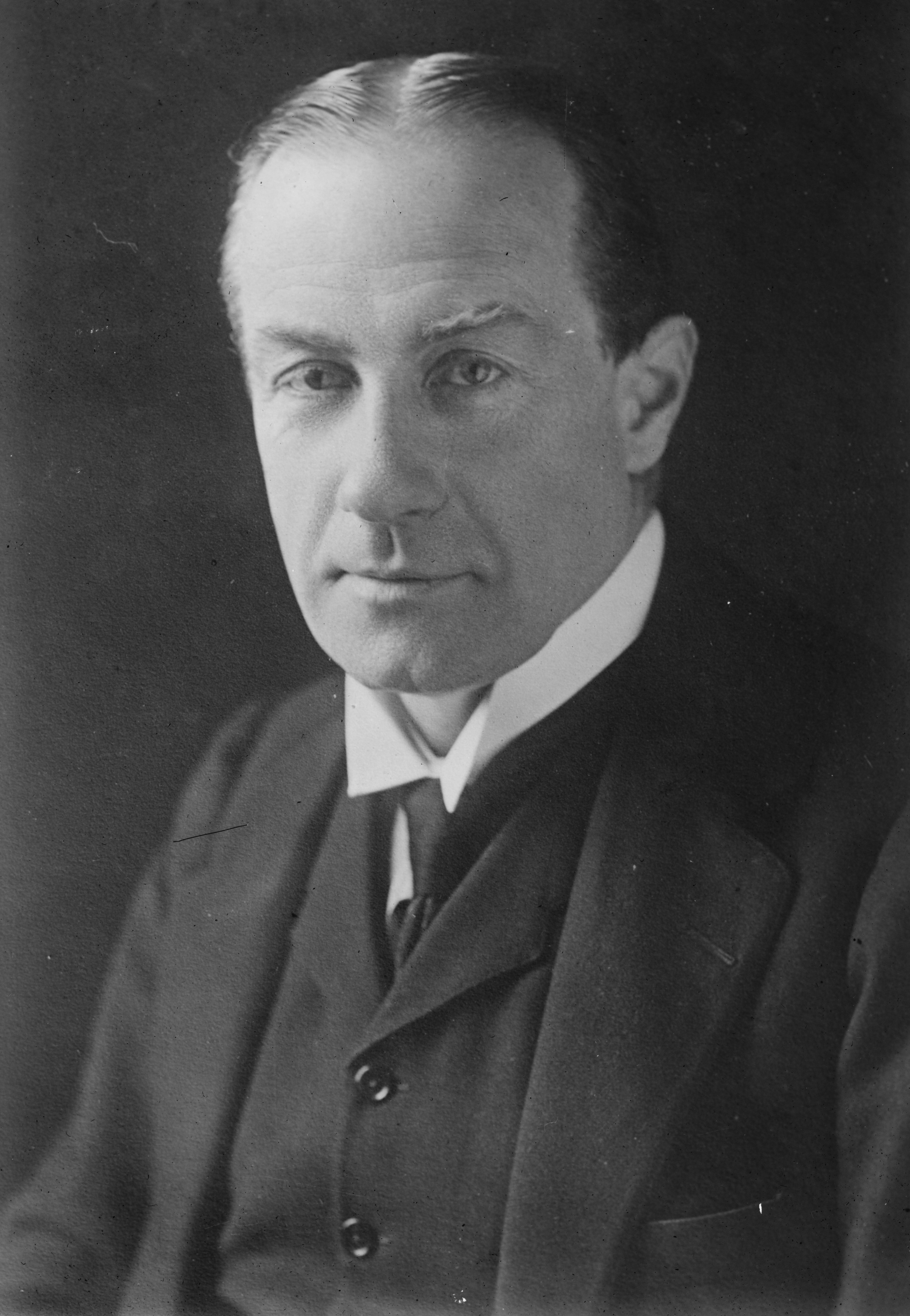
Stanley Baldwin in the late 1920s

"The bomber will always get through" was a phrase used by Stanley Baldwin in a 1932 speech "A Fear for the Future" given to the British Parliament. His speech stated that contemporary bomber aircraft had the performance necessary to conduct a strategic bombing campaign that would destroy a country's cities and there was little that could be done in response. It concluded that the conduct of future wars would require one to "kill more women and children more quickly than the enemy if you want to save yourselves."

At the time of the speech, aircraft performance was rapidly improving and new techniques and construction methods were producing ever-larger aircraft. For a time, this resulted in a performance gap where multi-engine aircraft outperformed the single-engine fighter aircraft that would have to intercept them. This gap could be further widened through the use of night bombing, which made interception practically impossible.

This state of affairs was relatively short-lived. By the mid-1930s, the same techniques were being applied to fighter design, once again handing them a significant performance advantage that allowed them to chase down even the fastest bomber aircraft. During the same period, the introduction of radar created an early warning system that gave interceptors sufficient time to climb to altitude before bombers arrived. The Battle of Britain suggested Baldwin was no longer entirely correct; many German bombers did get through, and did cause much destruction to British cities, but did not come close to destroying Britain's manufacturing or morale. Additionally, many bombers did not get through, being destroyed in the air. The rate of losses forced the Germans to abandon the campaign after a few months. Use of poison gas was not seriously considered by any nation, as immediate retaliation in kind would render this escalation pointless.

Later, Britain and the United States did produce enough bombers such that enough got through that a fair part of Germany's industrial production was hindered, albeit at high cost in bomber losses, and mostly only toward the end of the war, mainly because of the Allied development of long-range escort fighters capable of guarding bombers all the way to Germany.

== Baldwin's argument ==
Baldwin did not advocate total disarmament but believed that "great armaments lead inevitably to war". However he came to believe that, as he put it on 9 November 1932, "the time has now come to an end when Great Britain can proceed with unilateral disarmament". On 10 November 1932 Baldwin said:

I think it is well also for the man in the street to realise that there is no power on earth that can protect him from being bombed. Whatever people may tell him, the bomber will always get through. The only defence is in offence, which means that you have to kill more women and children more quickly than the enemy if you want to save yourselves... If the conscience of the young men should ever come to feel, with regard to this one instrument [bombing] that it is evil and should go, the thing will be done; but if they do not feel like that – well, as I say, the future is in their hands. But when the next war comes, and European civilisation is wiped out, as it will be, and by no force more than that force, then do not let them lay blame on the old men. Let them remember that they, principally, or they alone, are responsible for the terrors that have fallen upon the earth.

This speech was often used against Baldwin as allegedly demonstrating the futility of rearmament or disarmament, depending on the critic.

== Theoretical basis ==
Some theorists imagined that a future war would be won entirely by the destruction of the enemy's military and industrial capability from the air. The Italian general Giulio Douhet, author of The Command of the Air, was a seminal theorist of that school of thought. In contrast, H. G. Wells, in The War in the Air (1908), had predicted that aerial warfare would destroy cities, fleets, and armies, but such would not bring military victory, only the collapse of human civilization. Likewise, Olaf Stapledon, in his 1930 novel Last and First Men, depicts a very brief but devastating war in which fleets of bombers deliver huge payloads of poison gas to the cities of Europe, leaving most of the continent uninhabited.

In the 1930s, bombers had a slight performance advantage over fighters by having multiple engines and streamlined but heavy cantilever wing designs and so a successful interception would require careful planning to bring interceptor aircraft into a suitable defensive position in front of the bombers. Before World War II and the invention of radar, detection systems were visual or auditory, which gave only a few minutes' warning. Against World War I designs, those systems were marginally useful, but against 1930s aircraft flying at twice their speed or more, they did not provide enough time to arrange interception missions. The balance of force meant that bombs would be falling before the fighters were in position and there was little that could be done about it. For Britain, the answer was to concentrate on bomber production, primarily as a deterrent force.

Consequently, many in the 1930s envisaged hundreds of thousands of civilian casualties from bombing. In the 1936 film Things to Come, Wells scripted a war starting suddenly with devastating air attacks on "Everytown." Nevil Shute’s novel What Happened to the Corbetts, published in early 1939, posited a surprise attack on British cities, and described the experiences of a family during the bombing campaign that followed. That same year, military expert Basil Liddell Hart speculated that 250,000 deaths and injuries could occur across Britain in the first week. Harold Macmillan wrote in 1956 that he and others around him "thought of air warfare in 1938 rather as people think of nuclear war today".

The most influential among the few who disagreed with such views was Hugh Dowding, who led RAF Fighter Command during the Battle of Britain. Others included American Major Claire Chennault, who argued against the so-called "Bomber Mafia" at the Air Corps Tactical School, and Lieutenant Benjamin S. Kelsey, Fighter Projects Officer for the United States Army Air Corps, responsible for specifying American fighters that were capable of downing bombers.

== Strategic bombing in combat ==
Later analysis of the strategic bombing during World War II indicated that Baldwin's statement was essentially incorrect in that bombers would get through but at a significant cost in aircrew and aircraft. Using the Dowding system, fighters directed by radar were able to disrupt the German daytime offensive during the Battle of Britain, forcing the Luftwaffe to turn to less accurate night-time bombing in The Blitz. The difficulties for night fighters meant that was relatively unopposed, but the Blitz did not crush British civil morale.

On 17 August 1943, US Army Air Forces launched strategic bombing raids on the German cities of Schweinfurt and Regensburg with 376 B-17 bombers without long-range fighter escorts. The mission inflicted heavy damage on the Regensburg target but lost 60 bombers, or 16% of the force, with another 58–95 heavily damaged and a loss of 564 airmen killed, missing or captured. A second raid on 14 October with 291 bombers damaged ball bearing factories, halting production for six weeks, but resulted in the loss of 77 bombers, or approximately 26%, with damage to 121 more and 655 airmen killed or captured. Unescorted daylight bomber raids deep into Germany were suspended until February 1944.

The Royal Air Force's Bomber Command lost a total of 8,325 aircraft on bombing missions throughout the war, during a total of 364,514 sorties. That represents 2.3% losses per mission on average. However, loss rates over Germany were significantly higher: between November 1943 and March 1944, operations over that country resulted in an average 5.1% loss rate. The disparity in loss rates was reflected in the fact that at one point in the war, Bomber Command considered making sorties over France count as only a third of an op towards the "tour" total. Furthermore, the official loss rate figures never included aircraft crashing in the UK on their return (usually by damage sustained during the operation) even if the machine was a write-off or some or all of the crew were killed, which added at least 15% to the official loss figures. Losses on that scale could be made good through increased production and training efforts but at a great cost. Ultimately, the seemingly "low" loss percentage essentially came from the massive scale difference between bombing raids (several hundreds of bombers) compared to the available ressources to destroy them before bombing action. Indeed, the size of Bomber Command's offensive grew throughout the war. The United States Strategic Bombing Survey came to the same conclusion. Douhet's belief that a small number of bombs would be successful in forcing a country to surrender proved to be incorrect, and bombing alone did not cause the collapse he had expected in either Britain or Germany.

In the Pacific War, bombing missions were effectively conducted by both Japan and the Western Allies. Early in the war, Japanese carrier aircraft successfully destroyed or disabled the battleships of the US Pacific Fleet at anchor in Hawaii and destroyed the great majority of bombers and defensive aircraft there and in the Philippine Islands. The US military could not make effective use of the single radar installation based in Hawaii (it was used part-time as a training device) and visual spotters in the Philippines that should have provided an early warning to their fighter squadrons. In later stages, US bombers' air raids on Japan effectively destroyed many Japanese cities with conventional or incendiary bombs before the use of atomic bombs on Hiroshima and Nagasaki.

== "The bomber will not always get through" ==
General Curtis LeMay, who led the American bombing campaign against Japan, said three months after the Hiroshima bombing that "No air attack, once it is launched, can be completely stopped". After World War II, the major powers built heavy strategic bombers to carry nuclear weapons. By the 1960s advances in ground-based radar, guided missiles, radar-guided anti-aircraft guns, and fighter planes greatly decreased the odds that bombers could reach their targets, whether they used the traditional high-altitude or newer low-altitude approach. One 1964 study of British V bombers estimated that a bomber that did not use chaff or other countermeasures would encounter an average of six missiles, each with a 75% chance of destroying its target. The study thus stated that "the bomber will not always get through", and advocated Britain emphasize the Polaris submarine missile instead. For similar reasons, the United States Navy deployed Polaris submarines during that decade. At that time, it shifted aircraft carriers away from delivering strategic nuclear weapons to a role suited for both general nuclear and limited non-nuclear wars. The United States Air Force found converting its large fleet of manned bombers to non-nuclear roles more difficult. It attempted to redesign the B-70 Valkyrie high-altitude supersonic bomber project as a platform for reconnaissance and launch of standoff missiles such as the Skybolt. Skybolt was cancelled in 1962 after testing failures. A 1963 study stated "Long-range technical considerations, of course, militate against the perpetuation of the manned bomber".

== Recent reuse of phrase ==
In the 21st century, the phrase was reused to refer to suicide bombers and the inability of legislation or security to stop someone intent on blowing something up.

== See also ==
- Appeasement
- Carpet bombing
- Guilty Men
- Mutual assured destruction
- Schnellbomber
- Strategic bombing
- Roerich Pact
- Total war
