= Odas Moon =

United States Army Air Corps major

- Odas Moon in 1929
- Born: February 11, 1892; Alabama, U.S.
- Died: November 19, 1937; Old Point Comfort, Virginia, U.S.
- Military career
- Allegiance: United States
- Branch: U.S. Army Air Service; U.S. Army Air Corps
- Service years: 1917–1937
- Rank: Major

Odas Moon (February 11, 1892 – November 19, 1937) was an American aviation pioneer who was among a team of United States Army Air Corps (USAAC) aviators to break endurance records by performing aerial refueling. Moon was a founding member of the Order of Daedalians. Through his teaching and leadership at the Air Corps Tactical School, Moon helped shape and promote the concept of daylight precision bombing, using heavy bombers.

== Early career ==
Born on February 11, 1892 in Alabama, Moon enlisted in the U.S. Army from Texas on December 15, 1917. He served as a private first class in the Aviation Section, Army Signal Corps and was subsequently commissioned as a second lieutenant on May 16, 1918. Moon transferred to the United States Army Air Service on September 20, 1920.

Along with many other Army Air Service fliers, Moon was assigned to fly patrols along the Mexico – United States border from May to September, 1919. As part of his duties, Moon ferried a Mexican colonel back to Puerto Palomas, Chihuahua, Mexico.

In January 1924, Moon was flying a delivery of mail to an American Army base in the Panama Canal Zone when he discovered an American invasion fleet lying in wait 125 miles (200 km) away from Panama. The fleet was made up of four battleships, a carrier and attendant vessels. Their plan was to surprise and "defeat" the defenders of Panama as part of annual winter maneuvers. Moon was carrying a case of ripe tomatoes to give to his wife, and he proceeded to carry out a series of dive bombing attacks against the USS Langley, delivering three direct hits from tomato "bombs". When he landed at the Panama base with the information that the fleet was coming, Moon was congratulated by his superiors. Soon, though, word was passed back regarding an unspoken goal of the surprise invasion fleet: they were there to prove that the Canal Zone needed a $10M purchase of 16-inch coastal defense guns. After the invasion fleet was discovered by an air unit while still 125 miles out, the need for coastal guns was no longer seen as urgent by Congress. However, air defense doctrine was not re-examined as a result.

In 1924 or 1925, Moon taught bombardment to new airmen at Kelly Field in Texas. Among his students was Charles Lindbergh who, in 1970, wrote a letter to Senator Ralph Yarborough of Texas describing his memories of the foundational experience he was given by Moon.

== Aerial refueling ==
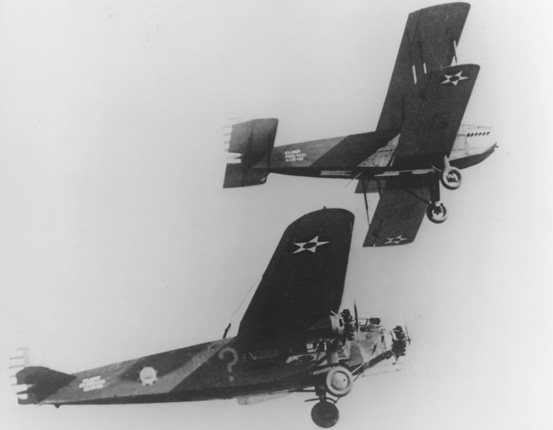
The Question Mark being refueled by a Douglas C-1 above it

As a trusted member of the 7th Bombardment Group, First Lieutenant Moon was selected to take part in the endurance demonstration flight of the Question Mark, a modified Atlantic-Fokker C-2A. During January 1–7, 1929, Moon piloted one of two aerial refueling aircraft, a Douglas C-1 based at Van Nuys Airport, and helped refuel the Question Mark as it flew for six days back and forth between San Diego and Van Nuys, California. Moon and his crew refueled the Question Mark sixteen times—two conducted at night. The Question Mark set a world record for endurance.

The USAAC followed up the flight of the Question Mark with a mission to demonstrate the applicability of aerial refueling in combat. On May 21, 1929, during annual maneuvers, Moon took off from Fairfield Air Depot in Dayton, Ohio in a Keystone LB-7 on a simulated mission to New York City via Washington, D.C. Plans were for the bomber to be refueled in flight several times, drop a flash bomb over New York harbor and a parachute flare over Atlantic City, then return to Dayton non-stop, again by way of Washington. The C-1 tanker employed to refuel the LB-7 was forced by icing to land in Uniontown, Pennsylvania, where it got stuck in mud. After flying over Manhattan, Moon circled south to drop three flares in the harbor near the Statue of Liberty. Moon landed at Bolling Field. The next day, the tanker joined the bomber and both flew over New York where they made a public demonstration of air refueling and four dry runs.

== Order of Daedalians ==
Moon was a charter member of the Order of Daedalians, a group of former World War I-era military pilots who formed the organization on March 26, 1934. Under Harold L. George, Moon served as the first vice commander of the group.

== Bomber mafia ==
As a first lieutenant, Moon graduated from the class of 1930–1931 at the Air Corps Tactical School (ACTS). From 1933 at the rank of captain until January 29, 1936, at the rank of major, Moon was assigned to teach at ACTS. Moon challenged his students to thoroughly examine the bombardment theories he presented so they could discover any flaws. There, Moon joined Harold L. George, Eugene L. Eubank, Haywood S. Hansell and Ralph A. Snavely in arguing for the primacy of an independent bomber arm. Moon was vocal in his rebuttal of the arguments used by a group of ACTS teachers who were promoting fighters as the all-around useful aircraft that the USAAC should invest in. The fighter enthusiasts—Claire Chennault, Hoyt S. Vandenberg and Earle E. Partridge—argued that the fighter in large numbers was capable of doing more damage to ground targets than the number of bombers that could be bought for the same money. Moon and the so-called "Bomber mafia" tore the fighter argument apart and established precision bombing as the war-winning strategy.

== Death and legacy ==
Moon was relieved of duty at ACTS on January 29, 1936 and died at the age of 45 on November 19, 1937. At the time of his death, Moon had been waiting in the Hotel Chamberlin, Old Point Comfort, Virginia to be retired from active service which was to have taken effect on December 31, 1937. He was interred at Fort Sam Houston National Cemetery a week later.

Retired Air Force Major General Eugene L. Eubank said in a 1982 interview that Odas Moon, a very close friend of his, "drank himself to death". Eubank said that he and "Odie" Moon had served in the Air Corps together from 1919 on the Mexico–U.S. border flights and had been devoted friends ever since. Eubank served as Moon's copilot in May 1929 for the New York aerial refueling demonstration.

During World War II, all of Moon's staff mates and commanders at ACTS went on to become influential general officers, as did all four officers on board the Question Mark and two of the officers flying with him in the tankers.

All the crew members of the Question Mark were given Distinguished Flying Crosses, but none of the tanker crews were so honored. Instead, Moon and the others received letters of commendation. On May 26, 1976, the two surviving tanker crewmembers—retired brigadier generals Ross G. Hoyt and Joseph G. Hopkins—were awarded the DFC for their exceptional contributions to air-to-air refueling by Chief of Staff of the United States Air Force General David C. Jones.

== See also ==
- Aviation history
