= Bomber Mafia =

Group of soldiers arguing that long-range bombers could win wars

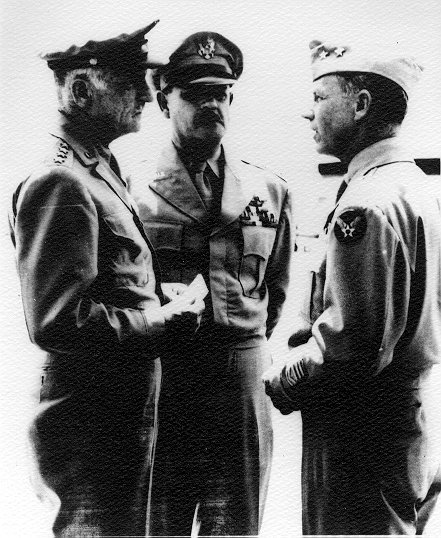
Daylight precision-bombing advocates Carl A. Spaatz, Muir S. Fairchild and Donald M. Wilson at Maxwell Air Force Base in 1946

The Bomber Mafia were a close-knit group of American military men who believed that long-range heavy bomber aircraft in large numbers were able to win a war. The derogatory term "Bomber Mafia" was used before and after World War II by those in the military who did not share their belief, and who were frustrated by the insistence of the men that the heavy bomber should take a primary position in planning and funding.

The bomber mafia succeeded in their goal to have extensive bomber fleets in the US military, but they failed in their wish to achieve pinpoint targeting precision during World War II. Instead, the bomber fleets were a major factor in the general American war effort, helping to reduce the enemy fighting power, especially in Japan where they destroyed the largest cities by shifting to area incendiary bombing tactics. After the war, the 20 years of foundational work by the bomber mafia resulted in the separation of the United States Air Force from the Army to become an independent military arm. The bomber mafia's strategic doctrine, changed by war and experience, helped shape the mission of the new U.S. Air Force and its Strategic Air Command.

Many years later, in the 1960s and 1970s, a related term, "Fighter Mafia," described those within the U.S. Air Force that favored lightweight fighters good at dogfighting instead of heavy missile-firing fighters.

== Origins ==
Developed over the years 1926–1929 at Air Corps Tactical School (ACTS) at Langley Field in Virginia, a forward-looking doctrine of daylight precision bombing was promulgated by Brigadier General William "Billy" Mitchell who advocated a greatly expanded role for the bomber force. After graduating from ACTS in 1931, Mitchell protégée Harold L. George stayed at the school to refine and teach the new bombing theory, soon recruiting as teachers his former students Haywood S. Hansell, Donald Wilson and Laurence S. Kuter as fellow bomber advocates. These four instructors, the core of US bomber advocacy, argued that an enemy's army and navy could be defeated intact due to the destruction of industrial and military targets deep within enemy-held territory.

This theory was first espoused by the Italian general Giulio Douhet, though his ideas included the strategic bombing of population centers that the American theorists eschewed. In contrast, American theorists devised a strategy of pin-point bombing that targeted enemy economies and weapon production. Though unproven, the major attraction of this type of strategic bombing doctrine was that a war was expected to be won relatively quickly, with minimal casualties, and that grinding, static trench warfare as seen in World War I could be avoided. In November 1932, the British statesman Stanley Baldwin proclaimed that "the bomber will always get through", referring to the strategic bombing of cities. The Bomber Mafia agreed with Baldwin only in that the bomber would prevail in its mission, intending for their bombing missions to be solely against military and industrial targets.

To effect this doctrine, the United States Army Air Corps would need to expend the majority of its resources in amassing a fleet of self-defending heavy bombers, and in the training and maintenance of a great many airmen to fill aircrew and ground crew positions. The ACTS officers who believed in the heavy bomber doctrine realized that any other Air Corps expenditures such as for tactical bombers and fighter aircraft would take away from the proposed large fleet of heavy bombers. Moreover, the men realized that the United States government would have to reduce funding to naval and ground forces in order to establish a great air fleet. To implement these changes, the ACTS instructors began to instill a sense in their students that a separate and independent air arm of the type described earlier by Mitchell, to be called the United States Air Force, was the way forward. As a compromise first step, the General Headquarters (GHQ) Air Force was established within the Army Air Corps in 1935, commanded by General Frank M. Andrews, a strategic bombing advocate. Andrews staffed the command with like-minded officers such as Henry H. "Hap" Arnold.

Although flawed and tested only under optimal conditions, the doctrine (originally known as the "industrial web theory") became the primary airpower strategy of the United States in the planning for World War II. Members of the "Bomber Mafia" produced the two airpower war plans (AWPD-1 and AWPD-42) that guided the wartime expansion and deployment of the Army Air Forces.

== Opposition ==
The term "Bomber Mafia" came from the sometimes bitter debates between United States Army staff and Air Corps men who observed, and argued with, the insistence by instructors and students of the ACTS that heavy bombers were the new primary weapon of war, and that a separate air arm was required to command them. For the first few years, the strongest voice at ACTS against the bomber doctrine was Captain (later General) George C. Kenney who called for the use of air power to attack enemy fighting units on the ground. He advocated the close coordination of air and ground forces, with an emphasis on medium bombers and fighter bombers. Kenney left ACTS in 1929, and heavy bomber doctrinarians filled the vacancy. The doctrine also ran counter to the theories of Billy Mitchell himself, who espoused that pursuit support was essential for daylight bombing operations.

As an expert in the use of air units to aid artillery and infantry, Gordon P. Saville held to the concept of tactical air power through his time as ACTS instructor from 1934 to 1936. Later, Saville successfully implemented his ideas in the Mediterranean Theater.

Captain Claire Lee Chennault, senior instructor in fighter tactics at ACTS, was a vocal Air Corps officer who challenged the bomber mafia for more than a decade; he was forced into early retirement in 1937, leaving the precision bombing advocates unopposed. The teaching of fighter ("pursuit") tactics declined, though Earle E. Partridge and Hoyt S. Vandenberg continued to discuss the role of the fighter.

Other opposition was more subtle. USAAC Fighter Projects officer Lieutenant Benjamin S. Kelsey appreciated that a large bomber fleet would be able to perform many military tasks, not just strategic bombing, and felt that the force's doctrine should remain flexible to meet any demand. Because of his lower rank, he was in no position to challenge the bomber mafia, and instead strove to work around their restrictions on pursuit aircraft. Kelsey formulated a new "interceptor" class of aircraft in order to sustain his idea that a well-armed fighter aircraft could successfully attack enemy bombers, and that, given drop tanks for long range, it could defend friendly bombers all the way to the target and back.

The Bomber Mafia, through a "failure of imagination" in not expanding the doctrine to include establishing air superiority as a prerequisite for success, would not accept either of these concepts—they believed the heavy bomber fleet could protect itself, and thus they contributed to the delay in the development of a long-range escort fighter until two years into the war. However, the doctrine nonetheless became the foundation for the separation of the Air Force from the Army, and the basis for modern airpower theory. Hansell concurred that both the theorists and the authors of the AWPD-1 war plan (of which he was both) made a serious mistake in neglecting long-range fighter escort in their ideas. Hansell wrote:

It was recognized that fighter escort was inherently desirable, but no one could quite conceive how a small fighter could have the range of the bomber yet retain its combat maneuverability. Failure to see this issue through proved one of the Air Corps Tactical School's major shortcomings.

== Advocates ==
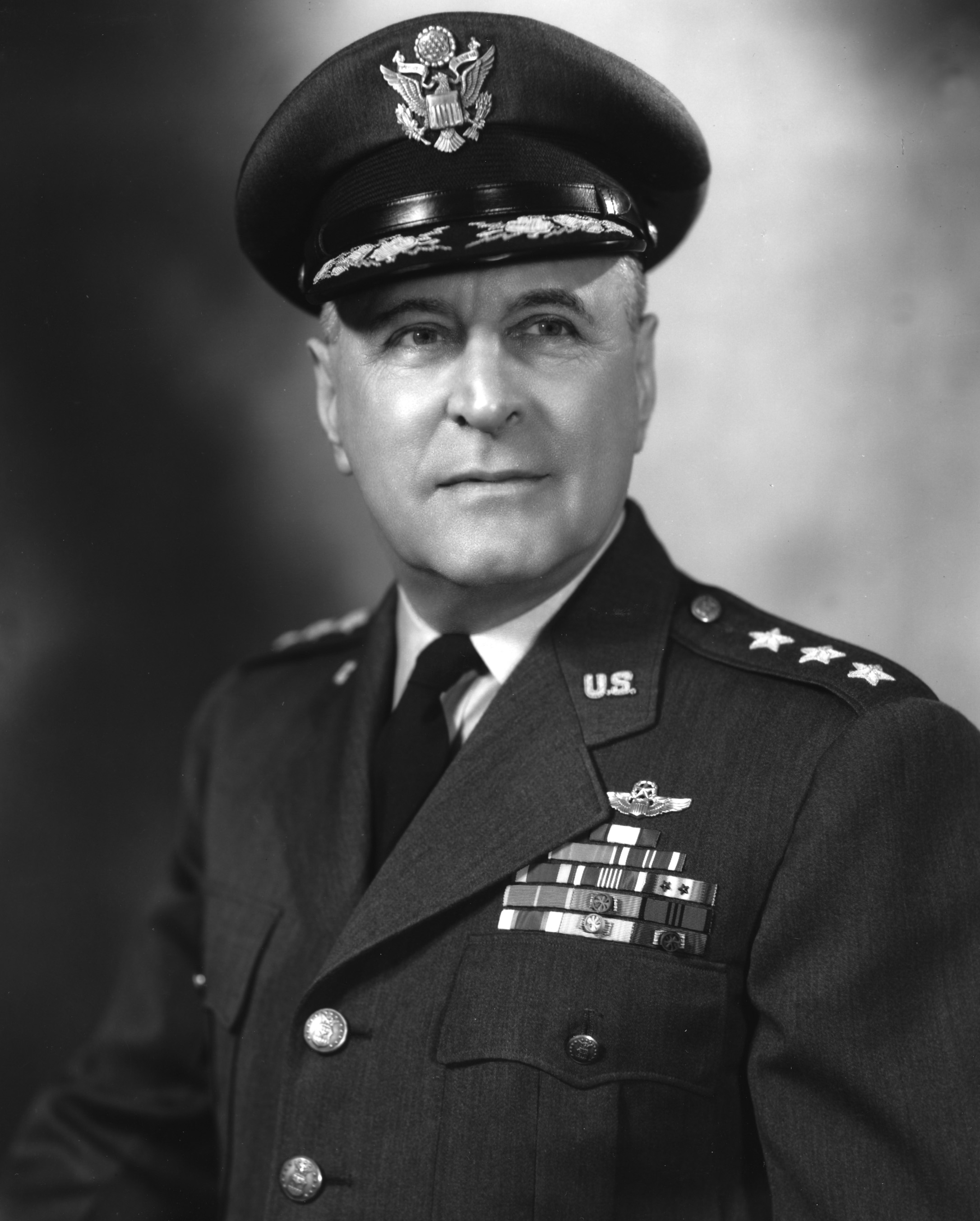
Lieutenant General Harold L. George, USAF

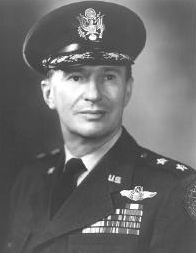
Major General Haywood S. Hansell, Jr., USAF

=== Instructors ===
- Harold L. George, leading theorist
- Haywood S. Hansell, Jr.
- Donald Wilson
- Laurence S. Kuter
- John F. Curry, ACTS commander 1931–1935
- Thomas DeWitt Milling, first school Officer-In-Charge
- Odas Moon
- Robert Olds
- Kenneth N. Walker
- Robert M. Webster

=== Graduates ===
- Frank M. Andrews
- Henry H. "Hap" Arnold
- Jimmy Doolittle
- Ira C. Eaker
- Oliver P. Echols
- Muir S. Fairchild (also an ACTS instructor)
- Barney M. Giles
- Curtis LeMay
- Emmett "Rosie" O'Donnell, Jr.
- Carl A. Spaatz
- Hoyt S. Vandenberg

== Legacy ==
In World War II, the Bomber Mafia's theory of the primacy of unescorted daylight strategic bombing was proved wrong. Fleets of heavy bombers were not able to achieve victory without the cooperation of the Army and Navy, and required the protection of long-range fighters for deep penetration missions. Overall casualties in the war were not minimal, and victory did not come significantly more quickly. Precision in bombing was not achieved until long-range fighter escorts became available and air superiority was achieved, as opponents had warned. The strategic bombing concept, however, was a major factor in the eventual victory and became the first core doctrine of the independent United States Air Force. Its proponents continued to promote the doctrine into the Atomic Age, forming the Strategic Air Command to carry out a vision modified to fit the needs of the Cold War and the threat of nuclear warfare.

The Bomber Mafia was gradually replaced in the 1950s and 1960s by advocates of intercontinental ballistic missile warfare.

In his popular history book The Bomber Mafia (2021), Canadian journalist Malcolm Gladwell wrote that the idea of precision bombing stayed alive in the US military, with greater accuracy obtained in the 1990s through to the present with guided bombs, such that a modern laser-guided bomb or missile might be expected to destroy not just a single building but a single room in the building, minimizing collateral damage. Gladwell opined that the moralistic, casualty-avoiding ideas of Haywood Hansell stayed relevant for many years while the heavy death toll of area bombing fell out of favor. In that sense, Gladwell wrote that Hansell "won the war".

== See also ==
- Big Wing, British fighter doctrine
- Dehousing, British area bombardment doctrine
- General Curtis LeMay. the USAAF's counterpart to "Bomber" Harris
- General Walther Wever, the prime proponent of a Luftwaffe strategic bomber force
- RAF Bomber Command
- Sir Arthur Harris, 1st Baronet, British believer in bomber fleet doctrine
- Strategic bombing during World War II
