= Attorney General Webster =

Attorney General Webster may refer to:

- Brent Webster, (acting) Attorney General of Texas
- Richard Webster, 1st Viscount Alverstone (1842–1915), Attorney General for England and Wales
- William L. Webster (born 1953), Attorney General of Missouri

== See also ==
- General Webster (disambiguation)
