= Harold L. George =

American aviation pioneer (1893–1986)

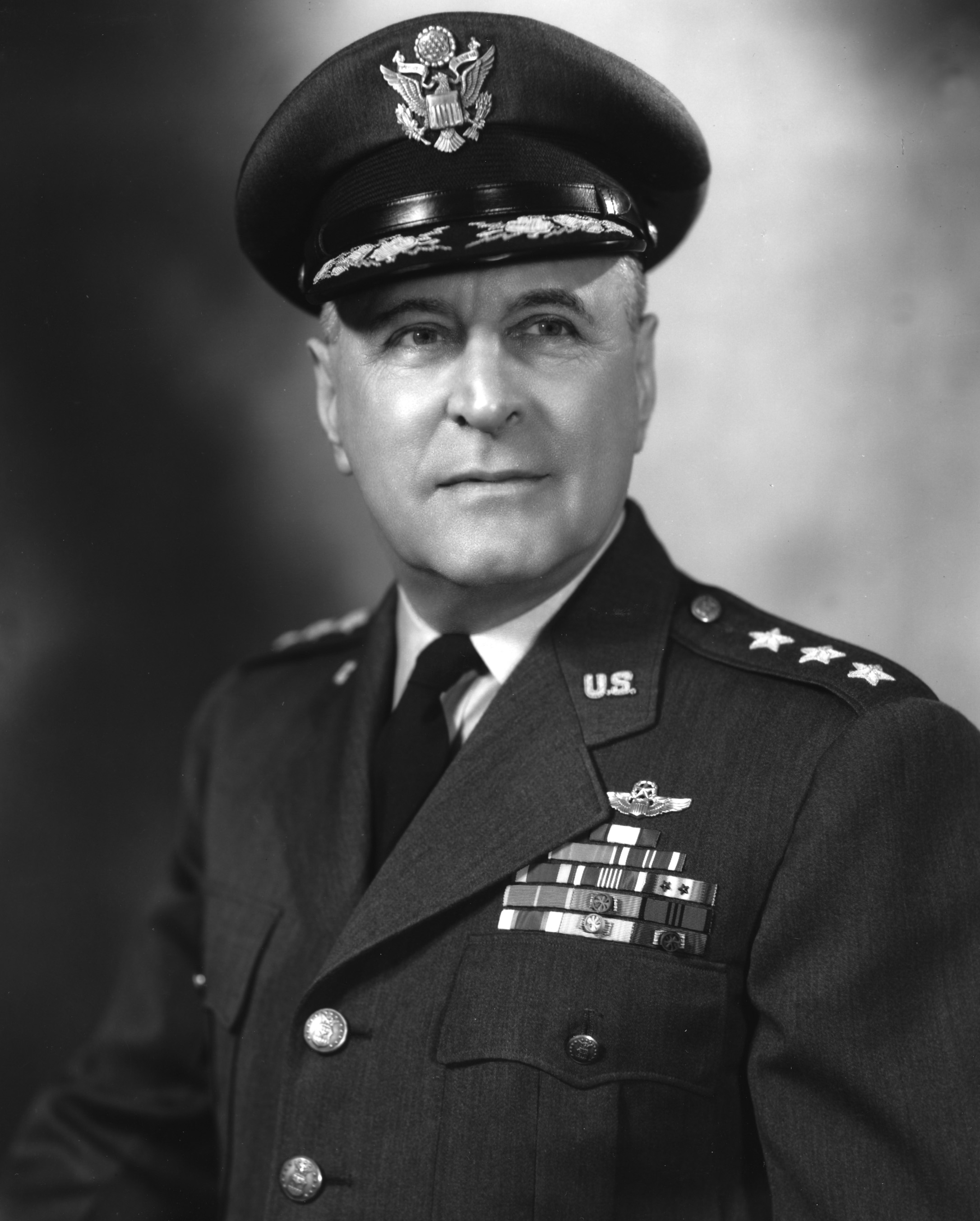
- Lieutenant General Harold L. George
- Born: Harold Lee George; July 19, 1893; Somerville, Massachusetts, U.S.
- Died: February 24, 1986 (aged 92); Laguna Hills, California, U.S.
- Burial place: United States Air Force Academy Cemetery
- Military career
- Allegiance: United States
- Branch: U.S. Army Air Service; U.S. Army Air Corps; U.S. Army Air Forces; United States Air Force
- Service years: 1917–1946, and 1955
- Rank: Lieutenant General
- Commands: 96th Bombardment Squadron; 2d Bombardment Group; Air Transport Command
- Conflicts: World War I: Meuse-Argonne Offensive; World War II
- Awards: Distinguished Service Medal; Distinguished Flying Cross; Legion of Merit; Air Medal; Knight of the Order of the Southern Cross

Harold Lee George (July 19, 1893 – February 24, 1986) was an American aviation pioneer who helped shape and promote the concept of daylight precision bombing. An outspoken proponent of the industrial web theory, George taught at the Air Corps Tactical School and influenced a significant group of airmen passing through the school, ones who had powerful influence during and after World War II. He has been described as the leader of the Bomber Mafia, the men who advocated for an independent military arm composed of heavy bombers. George helped shape America's bomber strategy for the war by assisting Air War Plans Division with the development of a complete aircraft production and bombing strategy.

In 1934, George helped institute the Order of Daedalians, and served as that organization's first Wing Commander.

During World War II, George led the Air Transport Command, taking it from 130 obsolescent aircraft to 3,000 modern transports, operated by 300,000 airmen. Following the war, he helped Hughes Aircraft become a very profitable company, and was twice elected mayor of Beverly Hills, California.

== Early career ==
George was born July 19, 1893, in Somerville, Massachusetts, to Horace and Susan E. George. He attended George Washington University, but decided to interrupt his studies when the United States became directly involved in World War I. George joined the United States Army and on May 21, 1917, received his commission as second lieutenant in the Cavalry as a reserve officer. A month later, he went on active duty with the Cavalry at Fort Myer, Virginia, and married Anna Virginia Helms on August 10. In October George resigned his reserve commission to become a flying cadet with the Aviation Section, U.S. Signal Corps.

George attended the ASSC School of Military Aeronautics (an eight-week ground school) set up on the campus of Princeton University and learned to fly at Love Field, Texas, receiving his rating of Reserve Military Aviator and a new commission on March 28, 1918. George went to France that September with an initial assignment to the 7th Aviation Instruction Center (bombardment) at Clermont-Ferrand. Two months later he was posted to Ourches-sur-Meuse with the 163d Aero Squadron, one of two DH-4B day bomber squadrons of the new 2nd Day Bombardment Group, Second Army Air Service. In the week in which it saw action in November 1918, just prior to the armistice, the 163d flew 69 sorties in support of the Meuse-Argonne Offensive. George observed that massed bombers, flying in formation, swamped enemy defenses and so reduced the attacker's casualties.

In 1919, George clerked part time for U.S. Supreme Court Justice James McReynolds, and graduated in 1920 from the National University School of Law with an LL.B. degree.

== Bombing advocate ==
In France, George met William "Billy" Mitchell and became convinced that Mitchell's vision of an independent Air Force was the best future direction for the American military.

After the war, George was assigned to the 49th Bombardment Squadron at Kelly Field, Texas. On July 1, 1920, when the Air Service became a combat arm of the line, he transferred to it in the permanent grade of 1st lieutenant. He next served with the 14th Bombardment Squadron at Langley Field, Virginia, and with the Aberdeen Proving Ground, Maryland, from 1921 to 1925. There George assisted Mitchell in his bombing demonstration against old battleships, and helped develop air-to-ship tactics. In August 1925, George went to Washington as chief of the Bombardment Section in the Operations Division of the Office of the Chief of Air Service. Later that year, still at the rank of first lieutenant, he was one of several young air officers to testify at Mitchell's court-martial.

In July 1929, George was ordered to Hawaii for two years with the 5th Composite Group at Luke Field. In September, 1931, he went to Maxwell Field, Alabama, to study at the Air Corps Tactical School (ACTS) where he helped refine the precision daylight bomber doctrine taught there. He was promoted to captain during the assignment, on December 1, 1931. Following graduation, George became an instructor at ACTS, teaching air tactics and precision bombing doctrine, and became de facto leader of the influential "Bomber Mafia". With Haywood S. Hansell, Laurence S. Kuter and Donald Wilson, George researched, debated and codified what the men believed would be a war-winning strategy that Wilson termed "industrial web theory". In 1934, George was made director of the Department of Air Tactics and Strategy, and vigorously promoted the doctrine of precision bombing in which massed air fleets of heavy bombers would be commanded independently of naval or ground warfare needs.

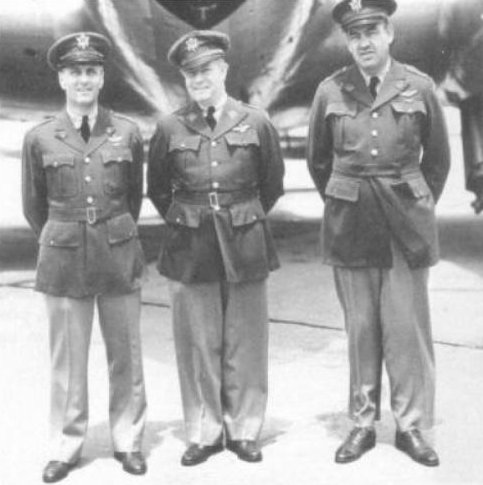
Majors Harold L. George, Vincent L. Meloy and Caleb V. Haynes as goodwill pilots to Bogotá, Colombia

George was promoted to the temporary rank of major in July 1936. He graduated from the Command and General Staff School at Fort Leavenworth, Kansas, the following year and returned to Langley as commanding officer of the 96th Bombardment Squadron. George flew to South America as a part of Air Corps goodwill flights in February 1938 and November 1939, and received for his participation the Order of the Southern Cross (Knight), from the government of Brazil. In 1940, George took command of the 2d Bombardment Group, which in 1937 had become the first unit equipped with the B-17 Flying Fortress bomber. Promoted to the temporary rank of lieutenant colonel on December 30, 1940, he also filled the position of Executive Officer of the 2nd Bombardment Wing from January 1941.

In July 1941, George was appointed assistant chief of staff for Air War Plans Division, a unit of the newly created USAAF Air Staff in Washington. In that capacity he assembled a small group of "bomber mafia" members (including Hansell, Kuter, and Kenneth N. Walker) to prepare AWPD–1, an estimate of air resources needed in the event of war that became the plan for the air war against Germany. He was promoted to colonel on January 2, 1942, and to brigadier general on April 19, 1942, when he took command of the Air Corps Ferrying Command (ACFC).

== Air transport ==
In June 1942, ACFC was redesignated Air Transport Command and tasked to become not just a delivery service of aircraft from factory to the field, but a worldwide cargo and personnel air transportation service. George led it throughout World War II, with the assistance of many staff officers including his deputy, General C. R. Smith, peacetime president of American Airlines.

New organizations were formed and new cross-ocean routes were established in the face of the enemy and under difficult conditions. George took the ferrying command from 130 obsolescent aircraft to 3,000 modern military transports, and expanded the personnel from 11,000 to 300,000. For this major contribution to his country, George received the Distinguished Service Medal, Legion of Merit, Distinguished Flying Cross, and Air Medal, as well as decorations from Great Britain, France, Brazil, Peru and China.

After the war he served for a while as director of information for the USAAF and as senior Air Force representative of the military staff of the United Nations. He retired from active duty December 31, 1946, with the rank of lieutenant general dating back to March 1945.

== Post-war activity ==
George accepted a position at Hughes Aircraft to work for Howard Hughes, along with fellow bomber advocate Ira C. Eaker. Eaker and George transformed Hughes Aircraft into a very profitable military contractor, reaching $100M in sales in 1948. George expanded the company beyond the manufacture of aircraft to focus on the new field of military electronics, primarily by bringing together expert electronics designer Dean Wooldridge and engineer-businessman Simon Ramo, both hired by George in 1946. In August 1953, Ramo and Wooldridge resigned. George followed a few months later to help form the Ramo-Wooldridge Corporation, competing directly with Hughes by developing ballistic missile defenses. In 1958, Ramo-Wooldridge would merge with Thompson Products, to become Thompson Ramo Wooldridge, which was shortened to TRW in 1965.

After moving there in 1948, George was elected to the City Council of Beverly Hills, California, in 1952, and in 1954 he was elected mayor, a one-year term. He served a second term in 1959. During his second term, George established an annual award to honor outstanding Beverly Hills police officers, given in the name of Clinton H. Anderson, the city's police chief.

In 1955, George was recalled to active duty in the United States Air Force for eight months as a special consultant to the Air Force Chief of Staff. George was relieved from active duty November 4, 1955.

By 1984, George was living in Laguna Hills, California. That year, he collected and donated more than $21,000 to various Republican Party candidates and conservative causes including the Jesse Helms-founded National Congressional Club and the "Helms for Senate" campaign. On February 24, 1986, George died in Laguna Hills. He was survived by his wife Violette; three daughters and one son. George was interred at the United States Air Force Academy Cemetery on March 3, 1986.

== Legacy ==
Walter J. Boyne highlight's George's involvement in pushing toward the concept of daylight precision bombing as a strategic, war-winning doctrine. Though he played a fundamental role in the development of U.S. air power strategy, he is perhaps better known as the first commander of Air Transport Command—the man who guided and expanded that organization throughout World War II.

The Order of Daedalians has, since 1956, awarded the "Lieutenant General Harold L. George Civilian Airmanship Award", a trophy "presented annually to the pilot, copilot and/or crew of a United States certified commercial airline selected by a Federal Aviation committee to have demonstrated ability, judgment and/or heroism above and beyond normal operational requirements." The Air Force Aid Society bestows the "Lieutenant General Harold Lee George Educational Grant Award."

In 1991 he was inducted into the Airlift/Tanker Association Hall of Fame.

== Recognition ==
George was awarded:

- Distinguished Service Medal
- Legion of Merit
- Distinguished Flying Cross
- Air Medal
- 1939 - Knight of the Order of the Southern Cross (Brazil)

== Effective dates of promotion ==
- Second Lieutenant - May 21, 1917
- First Lieutenant - April 1921
- Captain - December 31, 1931
- Major - July 1936
- Lieutenant Colonel - February 1941
- Colonel - January 1942
- Brigadier General - April 1942
- Major General - June 1942
- Lieutenant General - March 16, 1945.

== See also ==
- Aviation history
- List of accidents and incidents involving military aircraft (pre-1925)
- List of law clerks for the third seat of the Supreme Court of the United States
