= Air Corps Tactical School =

Air Corps Tactical School
- Active: 1920–1940
- Country: USA
- Allegiance: United States of America
- Branch: Army Air Corps
- Size: 25 instructors, 50 students
- Garrison/HQ: Langley Field, Virginia; Maxwell Field, Alabama
- Motto: Proficimus More Irretenti

The Air Corps Tactical School, also known as ACTS and "the Tactical School", was a military professional development school for officers of the United States Army Air Service and United States Army Air Corps, the first such school in the world. Created in 1920 at Langley Field, Virginia, it relocated to Maxwell Field, Alabama, in July 1931. Instruction at the school was suspended in 1940, anticipating the entry of the United States into World War II, and the school was dissolved shortly after. ACTS was replaced in November 1942 by the Army Air Force School of Applied Tactics.

In addition to the training of officers in more than 20 areas of military education, the school became the doctrine development center of the Air Corps, and a preparatory school for Air Corps officers aspiring to attendance at the U.S. Army's Command and General Staff College. The motto of the Air Corps Tactical School was Proficimus More Irretenti—"We Make Progress Unhindered by Custom".

The Air Corps Tactical School was notable as the birthplace of the Army Air Forces doctrine of daylight precision bombing. This doctrine held that a campaign of daylight air attacks against critical targets of a potential enemy's industrial infrastructure, using long-range bombers heavily armed for self-defense, could defeat an enemy nation even though its army and navy remained intact. The Tactical School, in formulating the doctrine, rejected the idea of attacking civilians.

Four former instructors of the school, the core of a group known as the "Bomber Mafia", were grouped together in the Air War Plans Division to produce the two war-winning plans—AWPD-1 and AWPD-42—based on the doctrine of precision daylight bombing that guided the wartime expansion and deployment of the Army Air Forces.

In a broader sense, the strategic bombing doctrine, adapted by factors encountered during combat, was also the foundation for the final separation of the Air Force from the Army as a military service independent of and equal to the other services. In 1946 the AAF created Air University to carry on the work and traditions of the ACTS.

== Background ==
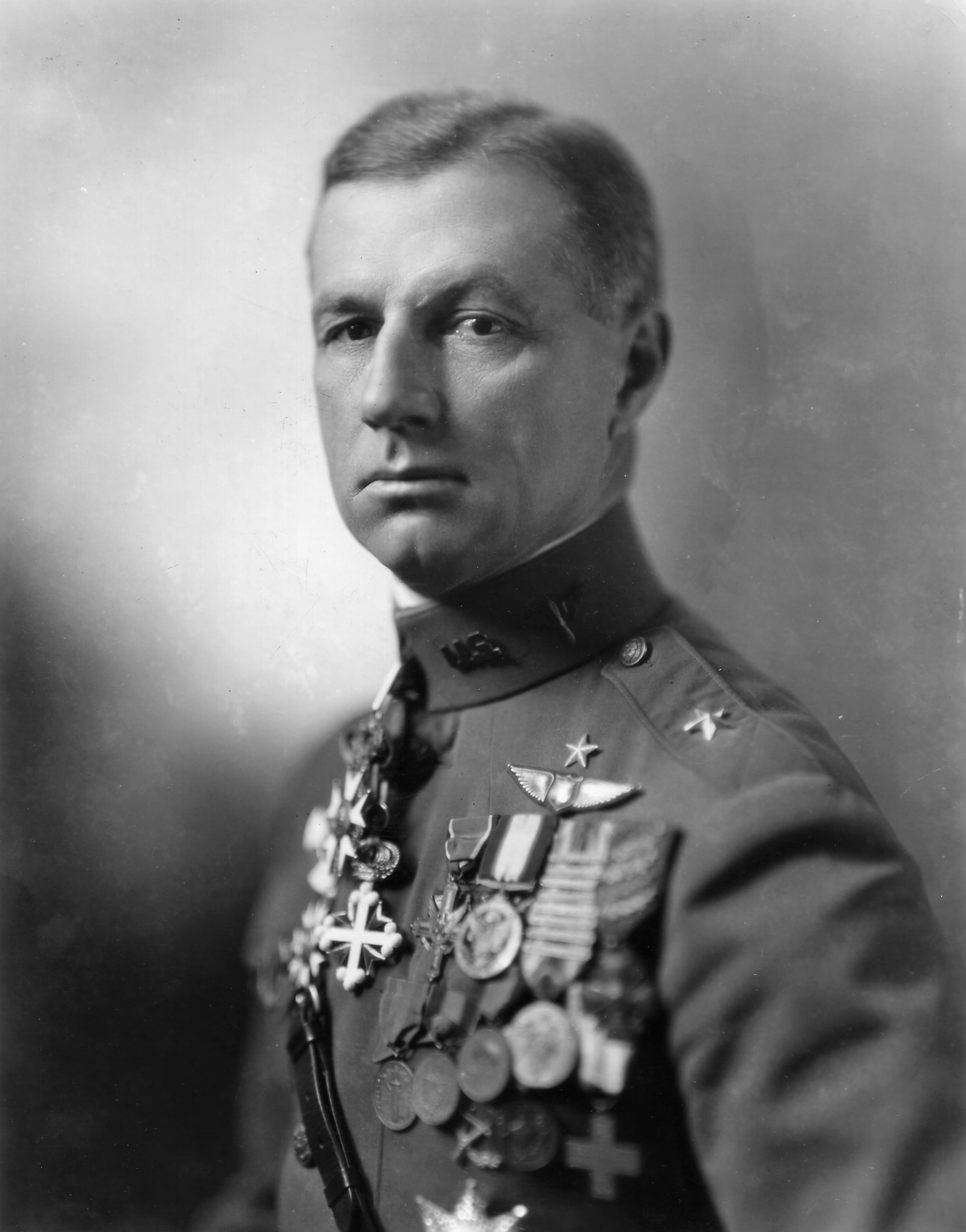
Brig.Gen. William Lendrun "Billy" Mitchell

At the end of World War I, observation remained the main role of the Air Service. However, air combat and limited bombardment operations indicated to veterans of the Air Service, including Brig. Gen. Billy Mitchell, that while ideally the service should be separate from the Army, it at the least should be centralized under an Air Service commander with some missions independent of direct support of troops. In reorganizing the post-war Army, the Armed Forces Reorganization Act of 1920 (41 Stat. 759) rebuked these ideas but did establish the Air Service as a statutory entity (previously it had existed by executive order only) and assigned it status as a "combatant arm of the line."

The Air Service followed the precedent of the other combat arms and began planning for its own service schools. An "Air Service School of Application" for technical training in aeronautical engineering, similar to the Ordnance School of Application at Sandy Hook, New Jersey, was set up at McCook Field, and began its first class 10 November 1919. Maj. Gen. Charles Menoher, Director of Air Service, wrote the War Department in October 1919 for permission to establish a tactical school at Langley Field, Virginia, to train field grade officers in the operation and tactics of the Air Service as a requirement for higher command or staff work.

On 25 February 1920, the War Department authorized the Air Service to establish its service schools. In addition to six pilot and advanced pilot training schools, and two technical training schools, an Air Service School was planned. It proposed to host courses for enlisted personnel as balloon observers, balloon mechanics, and aerial photography, but its main course was to be the Field Officers Course.

== Langley Field, 1920–1931 ==
=== Air Service Field Officers School ===
Major Thomas DeWitt Milling was assigned as officer-in-charge of the Field Officers Course at the new school and sent to Langley in July 1920 to set it up. War Department General Order No. 18 authorized the school on 14 August 1920. The balloon courses were split off into a separate school in a different area of Langley and the Air Service School was renamed the Air Service Field Officers School on 10 February 1921, after its primary function. The Air Service ordered 17 officers to Langley, eight as students and nine as instructors, although several officers swapped roles and some instructors were students as well. The 1920–1921 class opened on 1 November 1920, and although scheduled to last nine months, was concluded in May when both students and instructors were assigned to the 1st Provisional Air Brigade, as part of the experimental bombing of captured warships by the Air Service and the United States Navy. 11 officers, including four instructors, graduated the first course. The second class, beginning in October 1921, was devoted to the further training of instructors, the creation of a sound administrative system, and development of a well-rounded course curriculum.

In the first two classes, despite the school's title and function, only six of the first 23 graduates were field grade officers. A board reviewing all service schools of the United States Army observed that the Field Officers School had a course load that in other branches of the Army was distributed among several schools. Because all other Air Service schools were technical training in nature, the board recommended that the school be opened to all air service officers regardless of rank. Accordingly, Army regulations changed the name of the school to that of Air Service Tactical School on 8 November 1922. With the passage of the Air Corps Act of 1926, the school again changed its name, becoming the Air Corps Tactical School on 2 July 1926.

While at Langley, the ACTS was hampered by a chronic shortage of instructors, caused by a lack of policy within the Army for filling vacancies despite a rapid turnover in staff in the first three years. School administrators were forced to double as instructors. The situation was somewhat ameliorated in August 1924 when the Chief of the Air Service authorized extended duty for instructors, most of whom afterwards served four-year tours on the faculty, with an overlap between incoming and outgoing staff. Between 1925 and 1929 the number of instructors gradually doubled to 16 but even that number proved insufficient to research the vast collection of aviation literature the school's library was collecting to establish doctrine.

Despite school recommendations to the contrary, class size gradually increased, reaching 40 students by 1931. The first student from a branch other than the Air Service (an infantry officer) attended ASTS in 1923–1924. This became standard when the 1926–1927 class had five officers representing the other combat branches of the United States Army and three from the United States Marine Corps assigned as students.

The functioning of the school was also handicapped by a lack of permanent facilities, especially in quarters, and the school did not have a permanent academic building. When the five-year expansion program outlined in the Air Corps Act of 1926 failed to address these problems, and the creation of new units at Langley interrupted the functioning of the practical flying course, the Air Service began seeking a new location for the Tactical School.

The 1930–1931 class was the last at Langley. In its eleven years at Langley, the Tactical School graduated 221 students.

=== Tactical School curriculum ===
The academic curriculum was standardized in 1922 by the Army's board tasked with preparing "programs of instruction" for all Army schools. 1,345 hours of instruction in 20 subjects, taught over a nine-month period beginning on or about 1 September of each school year, included approximately 900 hours of tactics, including those of other services and combined arms tactics, although more than half (480 hours) were devoted to air tactics in observation, bombardment, pursuit, and attack aviation. Approximately 290 hours involved technical subjects, including aeronautical engineering, armament and gunnery, navigation, meteorology, and photography, and 150 to administrative studies, covering staff duties, combat orders, organization of the Army, military and international law, supply and courses in equitation and stable management.

The curriculum was altered in July 1923 by the newly created Director of Instruction, Capt. Earl Naiden, cutting the academic course by 500 hours to 845 total hours. 450 hours of the cuts came from the various tactics subjects, although the equitation courses were also eliminated, and all academic courses were scheduled in mornings. Naiden added courses in the history of the Air Service and map reading to the academics, and a 126-hour afternoon course in practical flying, instituted to provide refresher training to pilots but required of all students, including those of non-aviation branches. The course structure remained the same until 1939, with changes only in individual course subjects, averaging 25 hours per week of classroom study and 3.7 hours weekly of flying.

The first printed texts covering air tactics replaced mimeographed texts in 1924. This development of the tactics portion of the school led to increased emphasis, and in 1925 aeronautical engineering was eliminated from the curriculum. Theoretical use of airpower was first advanced in 1928, and beginning in 1929 a new course was taught at the end of each class, "The Air Force", coordinating all air topics covered during the year.

Army regulations also made the commander of the 2nd Wing, as the base commander at Langley, the commandant of the Tactical School. However, during its first four years this caused little disruption as Milling, first as officer in charge and then as assistant commandant, remained in actual charge of the school. In 1924 Maj. Oscar Westover became the first commandant to exercise control over school activities. The assistant commandant then became responsible for academics, assisted by the director of instruction, directors of the individual academic departments, and the school secretary (formerly the school adjutant).

Course instruction assumed a pattern combining both theory and practical instruction. Subjects were generally scheduled in blocks, particularly tactics, beginning with those of other branches and services, along with logistics and staff functions, from the beginning of each class until December. The courses in air tactics followed, described by one student as coming with "bewildering rapidity."

Practical instruction came in the form of "field problems," initiated in the classroom, then demonstrated and practiced in the practical flying course. Annual inspection trips were also undertaken until 1930 to the Engineering Division at McCook and Wright Fields in Dayton, Ohio, when trips began to the Infantry School at Fort Benning, Georgia. Beginning in 1924, ACTS students also participated in the annual Army War College maneuvers at Ft. DuPont, Delaware. However, by 1931 doctrinal disagreements between the schools and the exclusion of ACTS staff from the planning process created a perceived misuse of airpower on the part of AWC planners that ACTS assistant commandant Maj. John F. Curry criticized as not being of value to students of either school. Although Air Corps input resulted in some improvements, a lack of funds eliminated ACTS participation after 1933.

== Maxwell Field, 1931–1940 ==
=== Relocation ===
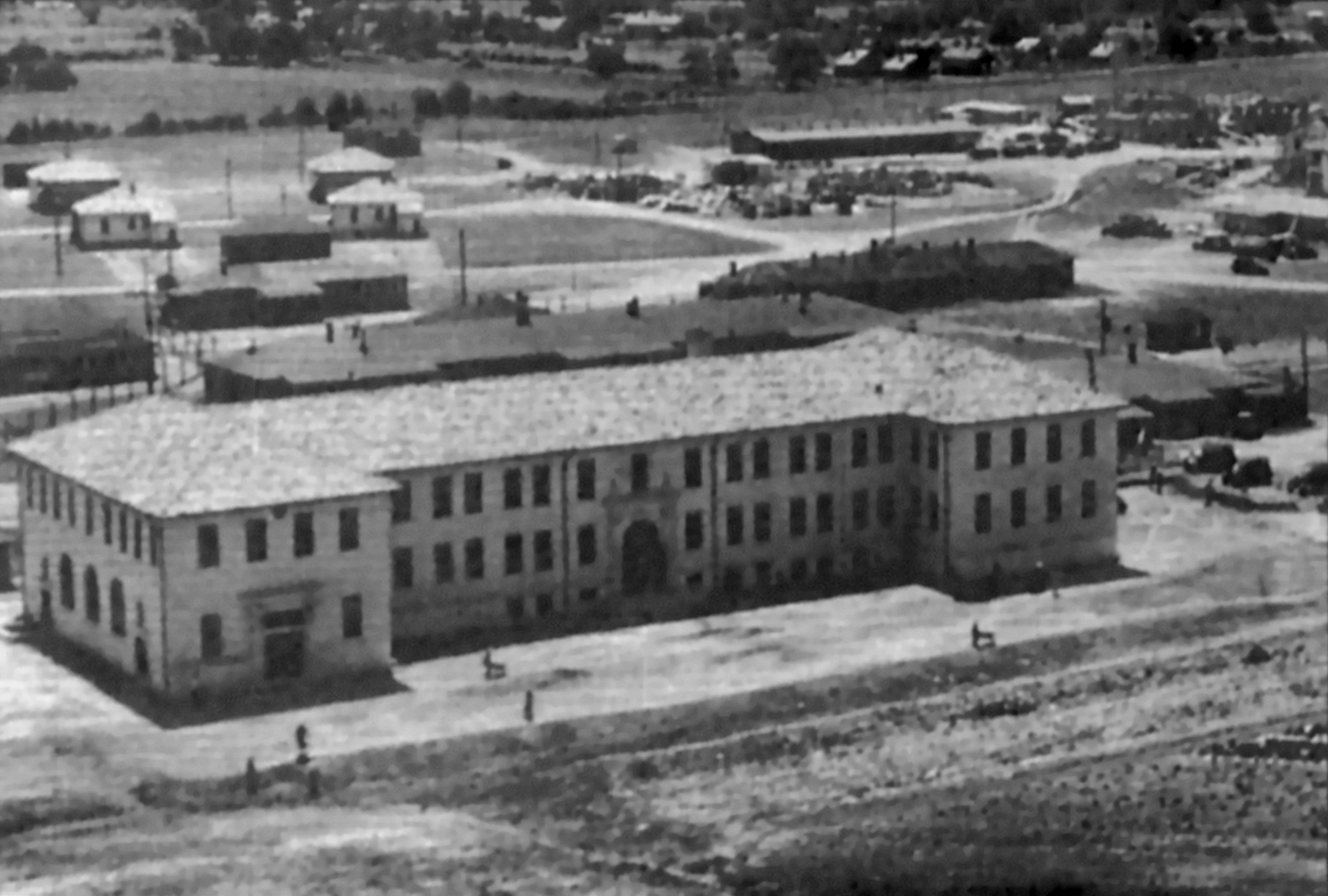
Austin Hall, Air Corps Tactical School

Difficulties with dilapidated facilities at Langley were not resolved, and a proposed relocation to Staten Island was rejected by the staff for lack of year-round flying weather, urban restrictions on flying, and a lack of support facilities. Locations at Bolling Field, Washington, D.C.; Richmond, Virginia; San Antonio, Texas; Fort Riley, Kansas; and another area of Langley Field were studied before the choice was made of Maxwell Field, a depot in Montgomery, Alabama, as the site for the school.

Plans were developed for a campus to accommodate a tactical school of 75 students, a squadron officers school of 50 junior officer students, and a school demonstration flying group of four squadrons. Congress appropriated almost $700,000 by July 1929 for new buildings, including Building 800-Austin Hall to house the Tactical School, and $200,000 to purchase acreage on which to build new officer quarters. Delays in construction caused two postponements of the relocation until June 1931, when Austin Hall was completed. On 15 July 1931, the school completed its move, although officer quarters were not begun until 1932. Architects commissioned by the Quartermaster Corps designed 99 residences for officers in an elegant style they deemed "French Provencial," and placed them in a neighborhood setting that became "the showplace of the Air Corps." The construction program at Maxwell continued until 1938, funded primarily by the WPA and PWA. A bombing and gunnery range was also set up near Valparaiso, Florida, for Tactical School use.

=== Course restructured ===
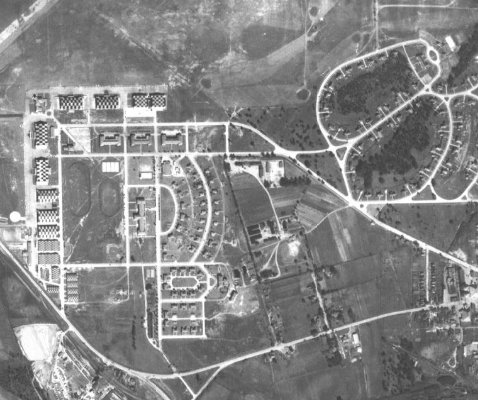
Aerial view of Maxwell Field in 1937

In 1934 Curry, now ACTS Commandant, reorganized the academic structure of the school along functional lines into three principal departments: Air Tactics, Ground Tactics, and Basic and Special Instruction. Flying was a fourth department. The "Air Force", "Attack", "Bombardment", "Pursuit", and "Observation" sections were placed within the Department of Air Tactics. The next year these departments became the Department of Air Tactics and Strategy, Department of Ground Tactics, and Department of Command, Staff and Logistics.

Four faculty committees were also established to administrate scheduling, the school library, and publication of doctrine. The Air Corps Board, which had been inactive since the move from Langley, was permanently relocated to Maxwell in 1933. Restructured by the Tactical School faculty, who doubled as its members, the Board was directed by the War Department to formulate Air Corps doctrine. The Board became indistinguishable from the Tactical School and undertook 77 projects between 1935 and 1942, a third of which dealt with tactical doctrine, and the remainder with equipment, armaments, field manuals, and training texts.

After the move to Maxwell, the practice of requiring students to fly actual missions as part of the instruction process was discontinued for safety reasons. Plans for a composite school group were suspended by the Chief of the Air Corps because of a service-wide shortage of personnel and aircraft, and attempts to have demonstrations by existing combat units were mostly unsatisfactory. The demonstration group was not authorized until August 1939 and was utilized for less than a year before classes were suspended.

In 1938 the Department of Flying Instruction was dissolved and its functions parceled out to the remaining departments. The Department of Air Tactics and Strategy became the dominant division at the school, and its Air Force Section the most important course, in which airpower theories were presented and explored, doctrine emerging as much from the students as from the faculty.

Association with the Infantry School increased, but inspection trips formerly used at Langley first became voluntary and then were discontinued. Only a handful of graduates had gone on to attend the Command and General Staff School, and as a result the Tactical School ended its role as a preparatory school. Instead the ACTS became the equivalent for Air Corps officers of C&GSS, and increased the emphasis on air subjects to more than half of the total course hours by 1934–1935, with an accompanying decrease in hours for ground and administrative subjects. Classroom studies were similarly altered. Lectures occupied only half of a classroom hour, with the remainder given over to discussion and debate of concepts presented and of alternative ideas.

=== Short course ===
The limited class size at the Tactical School led the Air Corps in 1938 to study the feasibility of using a series of shorter courses to allow a greater number of officers to attend. The study concluded that a significant number of potential staff and command officers had not attended the school and was growing annually. It recommended that the nine-month course be discontinued for a year and four 12-week courses scheduled, each having 100 students, all drawn from the group of prospective senior staff.

The plan had the drawbacks of limiting the amount of detail to which students could be exposed, and would require a rebuilding of the staff and curriculum when the long course was reinstated. Nevertheless, the curriculum was changed from 712 academic hours to 298. The short courses began on 1 June 1939, and continued for the next year.

== Theory and doctrine ==
=== Ascendance of bomber theory ===
In its first years, the Tactical School taught that pursuit aviation was the most important of air operations, epitomized by the 1925–1926 class text Employment of Combined Air Force that compared the importance of pursuit to the Air Service to that of infantry to the Army. However, in 1926 the Tactical School modified this principle by asserting for the first time that airpower could strike at vital points deep inside enemy territory rather than merely targeting an enemy's military forces in a war of attrition. By 1931 the Tactical School was teaching that "a determined air attack, once launched, is most difficult, if not impossible to stop." This shift in emphasis from pursuit to bombardment was the result of two factors: the air war theories of the time and the state of aviation technology.

Devotees of Billy Mitchell, many of whom had served with the 1st Provisional Air Brigade, dominated the faculty of the Tactical School at Maxwell. With their students, they developed a theory of warfare that invoked the superiority of the long-range bomber over all other types of aircraft. Going beyond Mitchell's ideas, they de-emphasized balanced forces and support of ground troops in favor of a doctrine that heavily armed bombers could fight their way to industrial targets in daylight, unescorted by fighters, and with precision bombing (made possible by the introduction of the Norden bombsight in 1931), defeat an enemy by destroying key war production targets, rather than engaging in costly and prolonged ground campaigns aimed at destroying enemy armies. While the theory was based on tenets of strategic airpower developed by Mitchell, Hugh Trenchard, and Giulio Douhet, it rejected the concept of terror-bombing of civil populations as a means of destroying the morale and coercing the will of an enemy state.

The formulators of this doctrine were relatively young junior officers, nearly all of them former reservists commissioned during or immediately after World War I. They viewed war in the abstract, admitted (and even apologized for) being unable to offer conclusive proof of their theories, but firmly believed that the dominance of airpower lay ahead in the future, when existing limitations of technology had been overcome. Nine key advocates, all of whom instructed at the Tactical School, became known as the "Bomber Mafia." The unofficial leader of the group was the bombardment section chief and later director of the Department of Air Tactics and Strategy, Major Harold L. George.

The doctrine brought them in conflict with the Army General Staff, which did not view airpower as a major striking arm but as an auxiliary to the ground forces. Despite the poor performance of what few bombers the Air Corps possessed, the air theorists persisted in their beliefs, testifying in favor of a separate air force before commissions set up in the wake of the Air Mail scandal.

Although flawed and tested only under optimal conditions, the doctrine (originally known as the "industrial web theory") became the primary airpower strategy of the United States in the planning for World War II. Four former instructors of the school, the core of the "Bomber Mafia", produced the two airpower war plans (AWPD-1 and AWPD-42) that guided the wartime expansion and deployment of the Army Air Forces.

=== Failure of pursuit theory ===
The doctrine was not universally held among air officers, however. Claire L. Chennault, chief of the pursuit section between 1931 and 1936, reasoned that the same technology that would increase the performance of the bomber would also eventually enable the single-engine fighter to challenge the bomber at high altitude, which it could not do in the years when the daylight bombing doctrine was formulated. Combined with a centralized early warning and control system (which came with the development of radar), defending interceptors would inflict serious losses on unescorted forces. The doctrine also ran counter to the theories of Billy Mitchell, who believed that pursuit support was essential for daylight bombing operations.

Chennault, however, also had a blind spot in his zealous advocacy of fighters as the offensive weapon of the Air Corps. He consciously avoided acknowledging the role of accompanying escort fighters as part of an offensive air strike. When his tour at ACTS ended, the fighter-versus-bomber controversy became a moot point among the staff, to the detriment of developing a role for escort fighters.

Although the proponents of daylight precision bombing at the Tactical School had a "failure of imagination" in not expanding the doctrine to include establishing air superiority as a prerequisite for success, and thus contributed to the delay in the development of a long-range escort fighter until two years into the war, the doctrine nonetheless became the foundation for the separation of the Air Force from the Army, and the basis for modern airpower theory. ACTS graduate, instructor, and "Bomber Mafia" member Haywood S. Hansell, concurred that both the theorists and the authors of the AWPD-1 war plan (he was both) made a serious mistake in neglecting long-range fighter escort in their ideas. Hansell wrote:

It was recognized that fighter escort was inherently desirable, but no one could quite conceive how a small fighter could have the range of the bomber yet retain its combat maneuverability. Failure to see this issue through proved one of the Air Corps Tactical School's major shortcomings.

However he also stated that ignorance of radar was fortuitous in the long run. He surmised that had radar been a factor in doctrine, many theorists would have reasoned that massed defenses would make all strategic air attacks too costly, inhibiting if not entirely suppressing the concepts that proved decisive in World War II and essential to the creation of the United States Air Force. Development of fighters was not ignored; by October 1940, over a year before Pearl Harbor, every type of piston-driven single-engine fighter used by the United States Army Air Forces (USAAF) in World War II had made its first flight except the P-47 Thunderbolt. However, the press of the enormous tasks confronting the Air Corps and the primacy of strategic bombing doctrine meant that development of a long-range capability for these new fighters was not undertaken until combat losses to bombers forced the issue.

== School closure and legacy ==
Before the short courses began, President Franklin D. Roosevelt called for an expansion of the Air Corps in January 1939. The need for experienced officers to supervise the expansion led to plans to reduce the size of the faculty and long course classes as a compromise to keep the school functioning. Six of the 24 Air Corps instructors would be returned to regular duty and class sizes would be reduced from 60 to 20 students. However World War II in Europe began on 1 September 1939, before the staff and class reductions could be implemented. The Air Corps permitted the short courses to be finished, but suspended all instruction on 30 June 1940. The Tactical School was reduced to a caretaker staff of seven officers, including two librarians.

One year later the Tactical School came under the control of the Southeast Air Corps Training Center, headquartered at Maxwell, with the objective of re-opening the school immediately. After completion of a study, the center recommended in July 1941 that the Tactical School curriculum be modified into a ten-week basic course in tactics for squadron and group level junior grade officers, to instruct 2,000 officers its first year and 5,000 officers thereafter, ending its twin missions of senior officer service school and doctrine development center. Instead the Air Corps Board was moved to Eglin Field, Florida and absorbed by the Air Corps Proving Ground, while all remaining staff of the Tactical School were transferred to Washington, D.C., where they continued work (mainly the production of training literature) until 30 June 1942, after which the school went unstaffed until its formal dissolution in 1946.

The ACTS at Maxwell graduated 870 officers, 400 of them in the short courses. During its entire history, the Tactical School trained 1,091 officers, 916 of them in the Air Service or Air Corps. 158 graduates from other arms included 118 Army officers, 35 Marines, and five Naval officers. The Tactical School also trained 17 officers from foreign countries. Of the 320 general officers in the Army Air Forces at the end of World War II, 261 were Tactical School graduates, including 14 of the 18 highest-ranking AAF generals. 134 officers (including 21 from the Army and Navy) served on the faculty of the Tactical School during its 20 years of existence, 58 of whom became general officers.

The senior service school function was abandoned for the duration of World War II in favor of development of an actual tactical center, responsible for the mass teaching of all aspects of air warfare to inexperienced officers who would become commanders of newly created units. Although commandants at ACTS had lobbied throughout its existence for the Tactical School to serve as the nucleus of such a center, it instead became the function of a new school, the Army Air Force School of Applied Tactics, activated 27 October 1942, in Orlando, Florida, both for the training of unit cadres and the continuing development of tactical doctrine.

The experiences of World War II created a new impetus for professional education of air commanders, as it had after World War I, but on a much vaster scale. The expectation of becoming a separate service from the Army resulted in planning for a service-wide educational system, the nucleus of which would be Air University (AU). Established in 1946, AU coordinated all professional education for Air Force officers, and "fell heir to the purpose and tradition of the old Tactical School".

== School commandants ==
Unless otherwise noted, tours ran from 1 July to 30 June.

- Maj. Thomas D. Milling, 1920–1924 (assistant commandant, directed school)
- Maj. Oscar Westover, 1924–1926
- Lt.Col. Clarence C. Culver, 1926–1929
- Lt.Col. Jacob W. S. Wuest, 1929–1930
- Lt.Col. Roy C. Kirtland, 1930–1931
- Col. John F. Curry, 1931–1935
- Col. Arthur G. Fisher, 1935 – 5 March 1937
- Brig. Gen. Henry Conger Pratt, 14 March 1937 – 19 September 1938
- Col. Albert L. Sneed (acting), 19 September – 21 November 1938
- Col. Millard F. Harmon, 22 November 1938 to 31 March 1939
- Col. Walter R. Weaver, 1 April 1939 – 30 June 1940

Without students:

- Brig. Gen. Walter R. Weaver, 1 July – 7 August 1940
- Col. Edgar P. Sorenson, 8 August 1940 – 16 July 1941
- Col. David S. Seaton, 17 July – 19 August 1941
- Col. William D. Bowling, 20 August – 2 November 1941
- Col. Elmer J. Bowling, 3 November 1941 – 5 January 1942
- Col. John A. Greene, 6 January – 30 June 1942

== See also ==
- Army Air Force School of Applied Tactics
- Air University (United States)
- Laurence S. Kuter
- Kenneth N. Walker
- Donald Wilson
- Muir S. Fairchild
- Fairchild Memorial Hall
