= Giulio Douhet =

Italian general and air power theorist

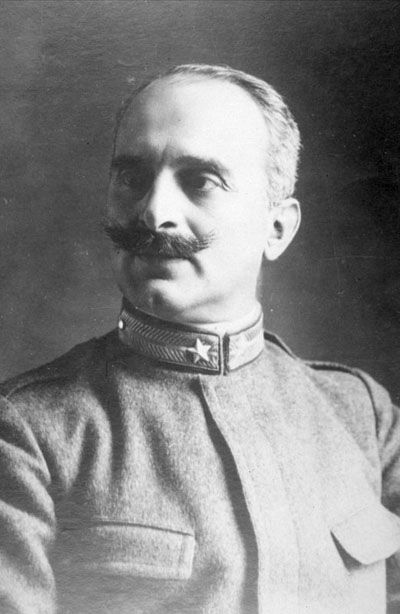
- Born: 30 May 1869; Caserta, Campania, Italy
- Died: 15 February 1930 (aged 60); Rome, Italy
- Known for: Airpower theories, a key proponent of strategic bombing

Giulio Douhet (30 May 1869 – 15 February 1930) was an Italian general and air power theorist. He was a key proponent of strategic bombing in aerial warfare. He was a contemporary of the air warfare advocates Walther Wever, Billy Mitchell, and Hugh Trenchard.

In his influential 1921 work The Command of the Air, Douhet argued that strategic bombing—particularly targeting civilian populations and infrastructure—could break a nation's will to fight. He believed that by inflicting enough terror and destruction from the air, the morale of the civilian population would collapse, forcing the enemy government to capitulate.

Douhet's theories proved influential, although the effectiveness of his strategies remains debated.

== Biography ==
Born in Caserta, Campania, Italy, from a family of Savoyard exiles who had migrated there after the cession of Savoy to France he attended the Military Academy of Modena and was commissioned into the artillery of the Italian Army in 1882. Later he attended the Polytechnic Institute in Turin where he studied science and engineering.

Assigned to the General Staff, after the beginning of the new century, Douhet published lectures on military mechanization. With the arrival of dirigibles and then fixed-wing aircraft in Italy, he quickly recognized the military potential of the new technology. Douhet saw the pitfalls of allowing air power to be fettered by ground commanders and began to advocate the creation of a separate air arm commanded by airmen. He teamed up with the young aircraft engineer Gianni Caproni to extol the virtues of air power in the years ahead.

In 1911, Italy went to war against the Ottoman Empire for control of Libya. During the war, aircraft operated for the first time in reconnaissance, transport, artillery spotting and even limited bombing roles. Douhet wrote a report on the aviation lessons learned in which he suggested high altitude bombing should be the primary role of aircraft. In 1912, Douhet assumed command of the Italian aviation battalion at Turin and wrote a set of Rules for the Use of Airplanes in War (Regole per l'uso degli aeroplani in guerra) — one of the first doctrine manuals of its kind. However, Douhet's preaching on air power marked him as a radical. After an incident in which he ordered construction of Caproni bombers without authorization, he was exiled to the infantry.

When World War I began, Douhet began to call for Italy to launch a massive military build-up, particularly in aircraft. "To gain command of the air," he said, was to render an enemy "harmless". When Italy entered the war in 1915 Douhet was shocked by the army's incompetence and unpreparedness. He proposed a force of 500 bombers that could drop 125 tons of bombs daily to break the bloody stalemate with Austria, but he was ignored. He corresponded with his superiors and government officials, criticising the conduct of the war and advocating an air power solution. Douhet was court-martialed and was imprisoned for one year for criticizing Italian military leaders in a memorandum to the cabinet.

Douhet continued to write about air power from his cell, finishing a novel on air power and proposing a massive Allied fleet of aircraft in communications to ministers. He was released and returned to duty shortly after the disastrous Battle of Caporetto in 1917. Douhet was recalled to service in 1918 to serve as head of the Italian Central Aeronautic Bureau.

He was exonerated in 1920 and promoted to general officer in 1921. The same year, he completed a hugely-influential treatise on strategic bombing, The Command of the Air (Il dominio dell'aria), and retired from military service soon after. Except for a few months as the head of aviation in Benito Mussolini's government in 1922, Douhet spent much of the rest of his life theorizing about the impact of military air power.

Douhet died of a heart attack in 1930 in Rome, Italy.

== Aerial strategy ==
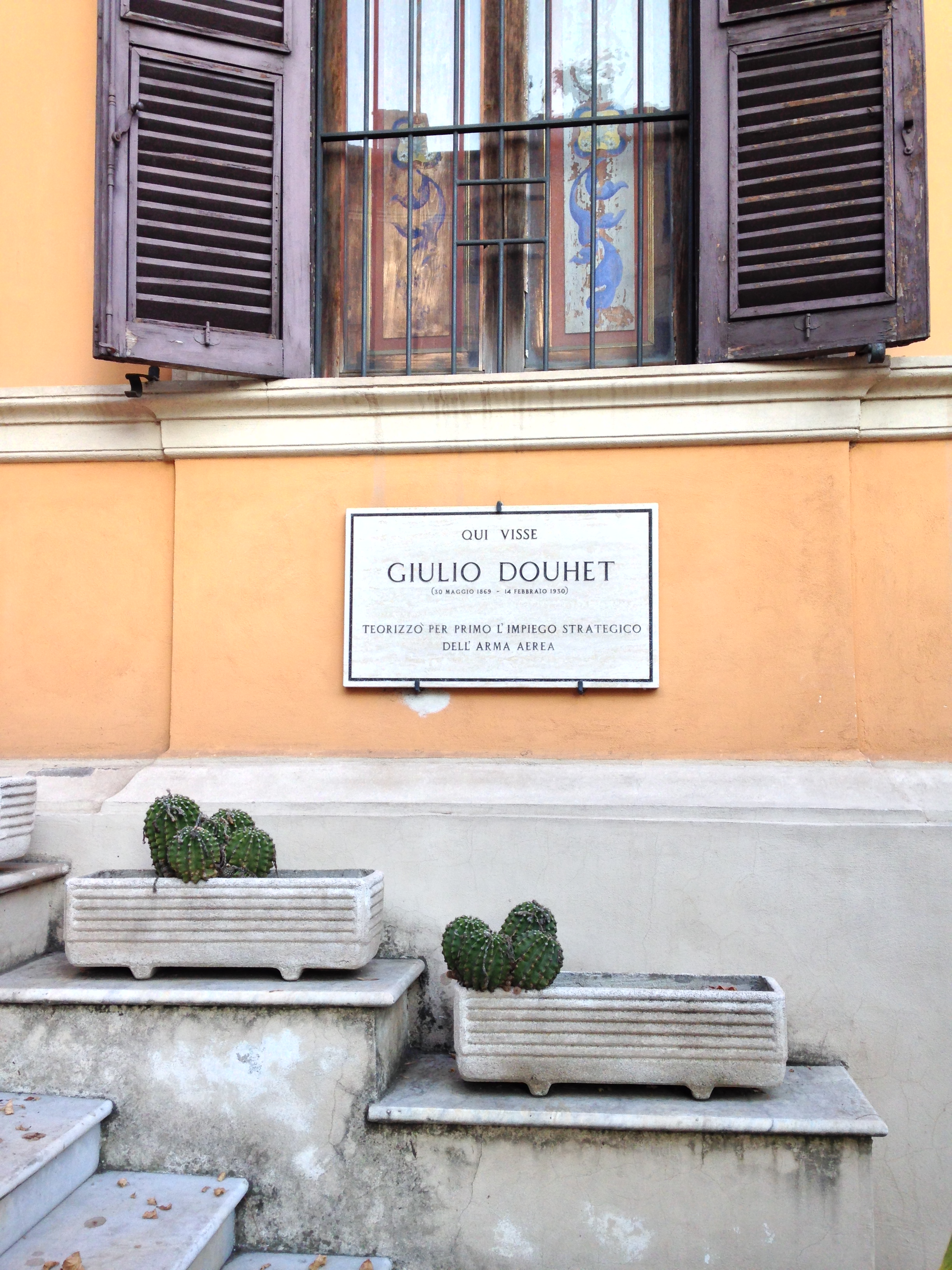
Douhet's former home in Rome today

In his book Douhet argued that air power was revolutionary because it operated in the third dimension. Aircraft could fly over surface forces, relegating them to secondary importance. The vastness of the sky made defense almost impossible, so the essence of air power was the offensive. The only defense was a good offense. The air force that could achieve command of the air by bombing the enemy air arm into extinction would doom its enemy to perpetual bombardment. Command of the air meant victory.

Douhet believed in the morale effects of bombing. Air power could break a people's will by destroying a country's "vital centers". Armies became superfluous because aircraft could overfly them and attack these centers of the government, military and industry with impunity, a principle later called "The bomber will always get through". Targeting was central to this strategy and he believed that air commanders would prove themselves by their choice of targets. These would vary from situation to situation, but Douhet identified the five basic target types as: industry, transport infrastructure, communications, government and "the will of the people".

The last category was particularly important to Douhet, who believed in the principle of total war.

The chief strategy laid out in his writings, the Douhet model, is pivotal in debates regarding the use of air power and bombing campaigns. The Douhet model rests on the belief that in a conflict, the infliction of high costs from aerial bombing can shatter civilian morale. This would unravel the social basis of resistance, and pressure citizens into asking their governments to surrender. The logic of this model is that exposing large portions of civilian populations to the terror of destruction or the shortage of consumer goods would damage civilian morale into submission. By smothering the enemy's civilian centers with bombs, Douhet argued the war would become so terrible that the common people would rise against their government, overthrow it with revolution, then sue for peace.

This emphasis on the strategic offensive would blind Douhet to the possibilities of air defense or tactical support of armies. In his second edition of The Command of the Air he maintained such aviation was "useless, superfluous and harmful". He proposed an independent air force composed primarily of long-range load-carrying bombers. He believed interception of these bombers was unlikely, but allowed for a force of escort aircraft to ward off interceptors. Attacks would not require great accuracy. On a tactical level he advocated using three types of bombs in quick succession; explosives to destroy the target, incendiaries to ignite the damaged structures, and poison gas to keep firefighters and rescue crews away.

The entire population was in the front line of an air war and they could be terrorized with urban bombing. In his book The War of 19-- he described a fictional war between Germany and a Franco-Belgian alliance in which the Germans launched massive terror bombing raids on the populace, reducing their cities to ashes before their armies could mobilize. Because bombing would be so terrible, Douhet believed that wars would be short. As soon as one side lost command of the air it would capitulate rather than face the terrors of air attack. In other words, the enemy air force was the primary target. A decisive victory here would hasten the end of the war.

=== Critical reception ===
Though the initial response to The Command of the Air was muted, the second edition generated attacks from his military peers, particularly those in the navy and army. Douhet's was an apocalyptic vision that gripped the popular imagination. His theories were unproven for another 20 years, when it was found that he had under-estimated the resources needed for successful strategic bombing. In Rivista Aeronautica in July 1928, he wrote that he believed that 300 tons of bombs over the most important cities would end a war in less than a month.

== See also ==
- Aerial warfare
- Strategic bombing
- Amedeo Mecozzi
