= Laurence S. Kuter =

United States Air Force general (1905–1979)

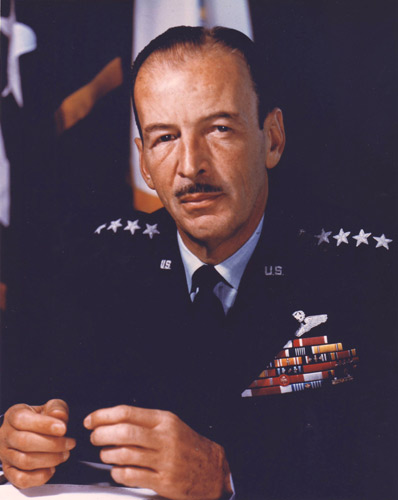
- General Laurence Sherman Kuter
- Born: May 28, 1905; Rockford, Illinois, US
- Died: November 30, 1979 (aged 74); Naples, Florida, US
- Military career
- Allegiance: United States of America
- Branch: United States Army; United States Air Force
- Service years: 1927–1947 (Army); 1947–1962 (Air Force)
- Rank: General
- Commands: Military Air Transport Service; Air University; Far East Air Forces; Pacific Air Forces
- Conflicts: World War II; Korean War
- Awards: Distinguished Service Medal (3); Legion of Merit; Bronze Star Medal

General Laurence Sherman Kuter (May 28, 1905 – November 30, 1979) was a United States Air Force general. He was a strong advocate of strategic bombing, a member of the so-called "Bomber Mafia" before World War II, and he was a Cold War–era four-star general in the United States Air Force (USAF) who served as commander of North American Air Defense Command (NORAD). Kuter (pronounced COO-ter) was a graduate of the United States Military Academy at West Point.

== Early career ==
Second Lieutenant Kuter was first assigned to Battery D, 2nd Battalion, 76th Field Artillery, Presidio of Monterey, California. He was formally assigned all battery officer duties except command. In May 1929 he was accepted for flying training, graduating from flying schools at Brooks and Kelly Fields, Texas, as a bombardment pilot in June 1930.

He was then assigned as operations officer, 49th Bombardment Squadron, 2nd Bombardment Group, Langley Field, Virginia. One month later Lieutenant Kuter was transferred to the United States Army Air Corps (USAAC). During his assignment at Langley, Lieutenant Kuter placed second in the annual bombing competition of the Army Air Corps.

In August 1933 Lieutenant Kuter moved up as operations officer, 2nd Bombardment Wing, and assistant base operations officer at Langley. During this period he flew alternate wing position with Captain Claire L. Chennault's acrobatic group, "The Men on the Flying Trapeze." This was the first recognized aerial acrobatic team in the military service.

He then was given a leading role in the operational development of the Boeing Y1B-9 twin engine bombers which pioneered high altitude bombing techniques and tactics in the USAAC.

From February to June 1934, Lieutenant Kuter served as operations officer of the Eastern Zone Army Corps Mail operations. He was the last officer relieved from this duty being held over to write the final report and history. At the conclusion of this assignment he was selected for the Air Corps Tactical School, Maxwell Field, Alabama. He graduated at the top of his class in the spring of 1935 and was retained at the school as instructor in bombardment aviation and in the employment of air power.

At this time the school was beginning to develop the role of strategic bombing in future warfare. Prior to this, planning had been directed to defensive and supporting roles. The 10,000-plane bomber fleet envisioned in Captain Kuter's lectures taxed imaginations at that time. He asked his students to imagine a massive long-range bomber force hitting the enemy homeland so hard that it would force surrender by itself, without engaging the enemy land and sea forces. Kuter and his bomber-advocate colleagues were called the Bomber Mafia by officers who preferred a balanced air force.

The ideas born and developed at the school were to play an important part in his next assignment in the Operations and Training Division, War Department General Staff, Washington, D.C., where he was ordered to duty on July 1, 1939. General George C. Marshall, who became the chief of the War Department General Staff on that day had called for the experimental assignment to the general staff of aviators, young and junior officers and officers who had not attended the Command and General Staff School at Fort Leavenworth, Kansas. Captain Kuter's assignment represented all three phases of this experiment.

== World War II ==
Early in 1941 he was a principal factor in several augmentations of the Air Corps. In August 1941, Kuter was brought into the Air War Plans Division where he was one of the four principal authors of AWPD-1, the basic plan for employment of air power in World War II. This plan was used almost without change through the war, in the form of its incorporation into the Combined Bomber Offensive.

In November 1941, Major Kuter was designated assistant secretary, War Department General Staff. After participating as one of a committee of three in the reorganization of the War Department, he was promoted to lieutenant colonel on January 5, 1942, and at the recommendation of General George C. Marshall to brigadier general on February 2, 1942. Commanding general of the United States Army Air Forces (USAAF) Gen. Henry H. Arnold transferred him in March to Headquarters USAAF as the deputy chief of air staff.

At this time there was extensive public interest expressed in the sudden promotion to temporary brigadier general of an officer who had been a temporary lieutenant colonel for less than 30 days. General Kuter never served in the active rank of full colonel. His was the first "jump" promotion of an officer as young as 36 since William T. Sherman. The next youngest general officer at that time was 46.

General Kuter was assigned overseas in October 1942 in command of the 1st Bombardment Wing (later 1st Bombardment Division), Eighth Air Force, Brampton Grange, England. When General Kuter assumed command he found four understrength groups of B-17 Flying Fortresses operating separately. He succeeded in welding the individual squadrons and groups into a coordinated fighting force. This was done on the assumption that the largest practicable combat unit over the target at one time would provide more mutual fire support, saving lives and planes, and improve the probability of destroying the objective without having to repeat.

Then in January 1943 Brigadier General Kuter was transferred to North Africa and the newly formed Northwest African Air Forces. General Kuter became the deputy commander for the newly established Northwest African Tactical Air Force, serving under Royal Air Force Air Marshall Arthur Coningham. During the campaign in Tunisia, new tactical air concepts were generated and USAAF regulations revised accordingly. The basic changes reflected in them are still the principle doctrinal basis for the present tactical air power concept of the United States Air Force.

During the Tunisian campaign, General Henry H. Arnold, commanding general, USAAF, directed that General Kuter be released from the Mediterranean theater and returned to Washington effective Axis forces surrendered in North Africa. So in May 1943 General Kuter returned to Headquarters USAAF to become assistant chief of air staff for plans and combat operations.

During this period, plans for the overall air war offensive for the defeat of Imperial Japan reached the stage where it became practicable to organize the United States Strategic Air Forces in the Pacific. This headquarters was set up in The Pentagon under General Arnold's personal and direct command. General Kuter served as General Arnold's chief of staff and deputy chief of staff, plans, in connection with the Twentieth Air Force and, as it moved into the Pacific Ocean Area, the Eighth Air Force. These units later formed the U.S. Army Strategic Air Force, Pacific.

In February 1944, General Kuter was promoted to major general. Previous to this, in August 1943 and extending through February 1945, he participated in the series of combined chief of staff conferences at Quebec, Cairo and London. When General Arnold became suddenly and seriously ill, General Kuter was designated as his representative to attend the Yalta and Malta conferences. His experiences in these two conferences are told in detail in his book, "An Airman at Yalta," Duell, Sloan and Pearce, 1955.

General Kuter went to the Marianas Islands in May 1945 to become deputy commander of USAAF, Pacific Ocean Area, and to help operate the U.S. Army Strategic Air Forces in the Pacific.

At the conclusion of the war in the Pacific, General Kuter was directed to return to Headquarters USAAF through Europe. In Paris he was intercepted by an order redirecting him back through the Philippines, Guam and Okinawa to assume command of the airlift forces as General Arnold's and General Harold L. George's, personal representative in arranging the airlift of General Douglas MacArthur and Army forces into Japan. He then returned to the United States.

During the next year General Kuter consolidated three Air Transport Command (ATC) divisions into the Atlantic Division, ATC, and served as its commander. While in this position, he represented the USAAF in the US-UK Bilateral Air Conference in Bermuda, and participated in negotiating an agreement with Portugal for American use of Lajes Air Field in the Azores.

== International Civil Aviation Organization ==
In September 1946, by presidential order, the general was appointed U.S. representative to the Interim Council of the Provisional International Aviation Organization in Montreal, Quebec, Canada. A year later he was reappointed by presidential order as the U.S. representative to the then permanent International Civil Aviation Organization. In his appointment he had the personal rank of minister. During this period of the birth of international agreements in aviation, General Kuter participated in major civil aviation conferences in London, Cairo, Lima and Rio de Janeiro.

This experience led U.S. president Harry S. Truman to nominate General Kuter for the chairmanship of the Civil Aeronautics Board. At this time several military figures had recently been appointed to high civilian positions and General Dwight D. Eisenhower was emerging as a possible political figure, Republican or Democrat. The Senate committee refused to confirm the nomination of another military man to such position, and indicated that it would be necessary for General Kuter to resign from the service before accepting the position. General Kuter preferred not to resign from the United States Air Force (USAF) and asked that his nomination be withdrawn.

== Military Air Transport Service ==
Within a month he was named commander designate of the proposed Military Air Transport Service (MATS) in February 1948. This was the first integrated military service. He was primarily responsible for its charter and organization. When MATS was activated four months later General Kuter became its first commander, MATS proved its organizational soundness and its operational capability in its first six months of operations when its global resources were directed into the operation of the Berlin airlift.

Two years later the same global resources of MATS were operating across the Pacific Ocean in support of fighting in the Korean War. At the same time General Kuter's command brought air evacuation of troops into extensive and effective operation.

== Promotion to general ==
He was promoted to lieutenant general in April 1951 and in October of that year was designated deputy chief of staff for personnel, Headquarters USAF. In this position General Kuter initiated actions in the USAF and in cooperation with the personnel chiefs of the other services which culminated four years later in extensive legislation raising pay and otherwise increasing the desirability of a military service career. He held this position until April 1953 when he assumed command of the Air University, Maxwell Air Force Base, Alabama.

As commander, Air University, General Kuter raised the status of the Air Command and Staff School to college level, the Squadron Officer's Course to school level, and brought the Air University closer to its original concept as a university with a university staff and faculty to handle all levels of professional military education in the USAF. This concept has been adopted by the air forces of several foreign countries.

Lieutenant General Kuter was promoted to full general while in flight at 0001 hours, May 29, 1955, while en route to Tokyo to assume command of the Far East Air Forces.

In this new command, General Kuter immediately found the mobility of air power impeded by the existence of two major commands in the Pacific. His air units were split between the Far East Command with headquarters in Tokyo and the Pacific Command in Hawaii. He could not move air units from one of these commands to the other without permission of two theater commanders or the Joint Chiefs in Washington. Rapid movement to meet potential air threats is a basic essential of the jet age and General Kuter's long-term recommendations and objections to the divided command system were registered in a formal recommendation to the chief of staff, USAF. This study was then used as the USAF position before the Joint Chiefs of Staff and led to the consolidation of the two commands and establishment of the present Pacific Command.

When Far East Air Forces was disestablished in this consolidation of command, General Kuter became commander in chief of the newly created Pacific Air Forces on July 1, 1957. Pacific Air Forces is the air arm of Pacific Command. Its headquarters is at Hickam Air Force Base, Hawaii.

According to declassified Pentagon documents, Kuter was among the USAF generals advocating the use of nuclear weapons if China blockaded the Taiwan Strait in 1958. When U.S. president Eisenhower vetoed this policy, forcing the USAF to plan for the defense of Taiwan using conventional weapons, Kuter continued to object. General Kuter was appointed Commander in Chief of NORAD, headquartered in Colorado Springs, Colorado in 1959 and held that post until his retirement in 1962.

== Military records ==
General Kuter was a rated command pilot, combat observer, technical observer and aircraft observer. He logged more than 8,000 flying hours, including 3,200 hours as a command pilot. Before 1952 he had flown around the world seven times visiting Air Force installations. He retired from the United States Air Force on July 1, 1962, and died November 30, 1979. His remains were interred at the United States Air Force Academy Cemetery.

In addition to three awards of the Distinguished Service Medal, Kuter received the Legion of Merit and the Bronze Star Medal. He was awarded the Croix de Guerre with palm and made a chevalier of the Legion of Honour by France and also made an honorary commander of the Order of the British Empire by the United Kingdom.

== Legacy ==
In 1980, the trophy for the Air Force–Hawaii football rivalry was named in his honor. It was awarded from 1980 to 1997 when both schools were in the Western Athletic Conference, went dormant after Air Force left for the Mountain West Conference, then revived in 2001 after Hawaii followed suit.

In 1990 he was inducted into the Airlift/Tanker Association Hall of Fame.
