= Interceptor aircraft =

Fighter aircraft specializing in the defensive interception of enemy aircraft

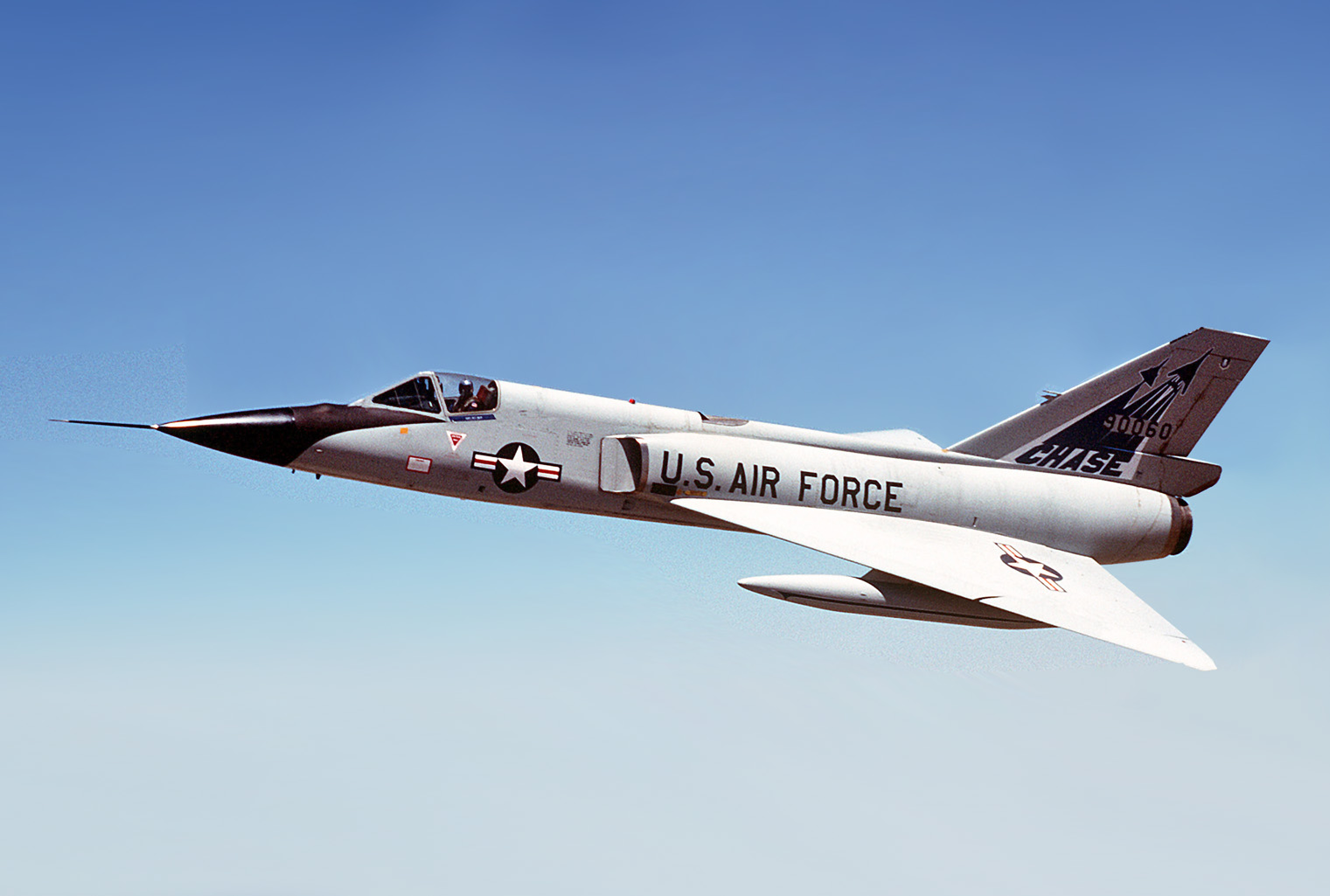
The Convair F-106 Delta Dart, a principal interceptor of the U.S. Air Force in the 1960s, 70s, and 80s

An interceptor aircraft, or simply interceptor, is a type of fighter aircraft designed specifically for the defensive interception role against an attacking enemy aircraft, particularly bombers and reconnaissance aircraft. This role originally involved zero-notice, short missions from well-supplied ground bases against an approaching high-altitude target, necessitating readiness, climb rate, speed, maneuverability and short-range weapons capability over other factors in aircraft design. The role later evolved into a broader spectrum of missions favored by a general design emphasis around speed and climb rate. Aircraft that are capable of being or are employed as both "standard" air superiority fighters and as interceptors are sometimes known as fighter-interceptors. In the post-World War II jet age, there are two general classes of interceptor: light fighters, designed for high performance over short range; and heavy fighters, which are intended to operate over longer ranges, in contested airspace and adverse meteorological conditions. While the second type was exemplified historically by specialized night fighter and all-weather interceptor designs, the integration of mid-air refueling, satellite navigation, on-board radar, and beyond visual range (BVR) missile systems since the 1960s has allowed most frontline fighter designs to fill the roles once reserved for specialized night/all-weather fighters.

For daytime operations, conventional light fighters have normally filled the interceptor role. Day interceptors have been used in a defensive role since World War I, and are perhaps best known from major actions like the Battle of Britain, when the Supermarine Spitfire and Hawker Hurricane were part of a successful defensive strategy. However, dramatic improvements in both ground-based and airborne radar gave greater flexibility to existing fighters and few later designs were conceived as dedicated day interceptors. Exceptions include the Messerschmitt Me 163 Komet, which was the only rocket-powered, crewed military aircraft to see combat. To a lesser degree, the Mikoyan-Gurevich MiG-15, which had heavy armament specifically intended for anti-bomber missions, was also a specialized day interceptor.

Night fighters and bomber destroyers are interceptors of the heavy type, although initially they were rarely referred to as such. In the early Cold War era the combination of jet-powered bombers and nuclear weapons created air force demand for highly capable interceptors; it is in regards to this period that the term is perhaps most recognized and used. Cold War-era interceptors became increasingly distinct from their air superiority counterparts, with the former often sacrificing range, endurance, and maneuverability for speed, rate of climb, and armament dedicated to attacking large strategic bombers. Examples of classic interceptors of this era include the Convair F-106 Delta Dart, Sukhoi Su-15, and English Electric Lightning.

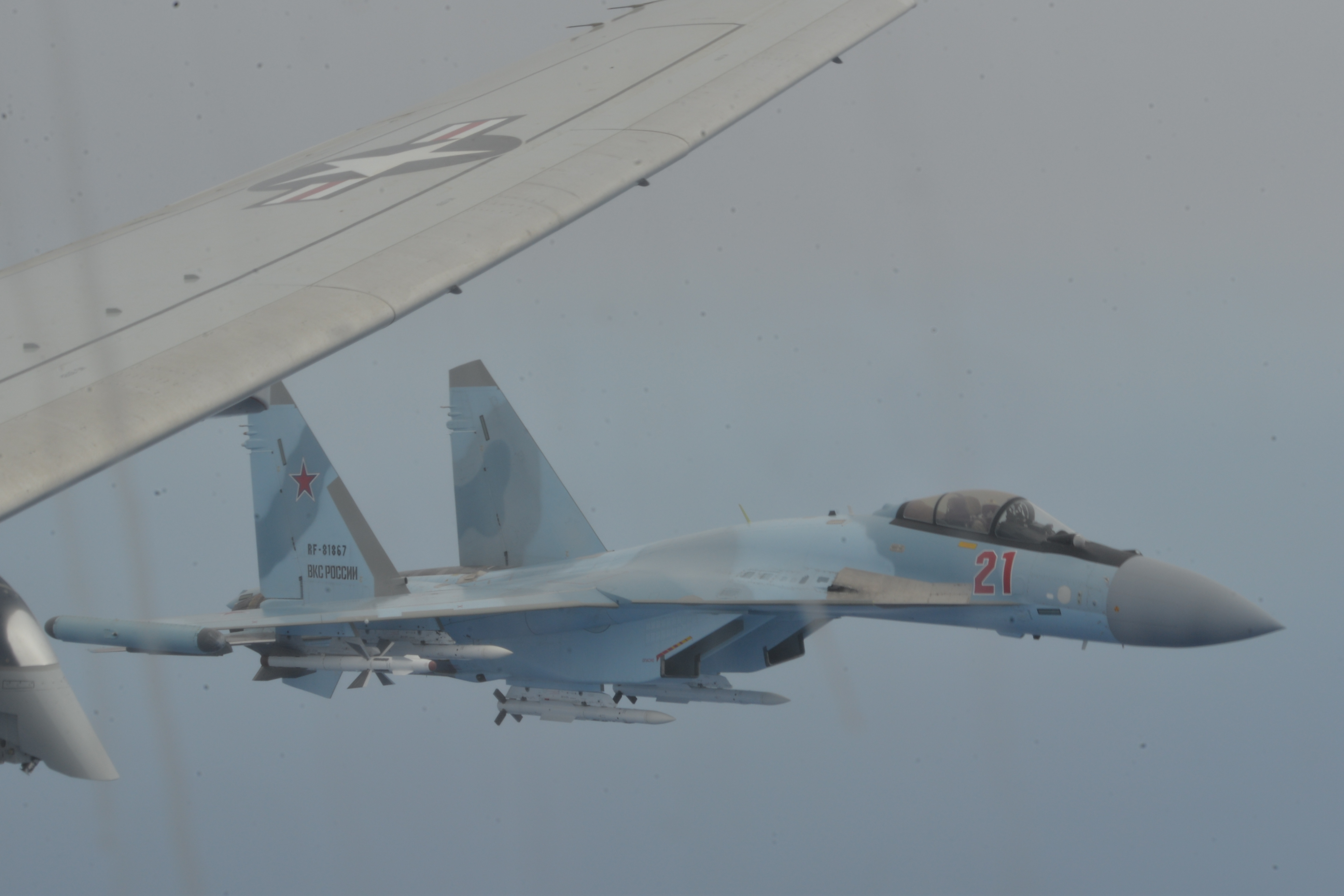
An armed Russian Su-35S intercepted a P-8A in 2020, being an example of modern interceptions.

Through the 1960s and 1970s, the rapid improvements in design led to most air-superiority and multirole fighters, such as the Grumman F-14 Tomcat and McDonnell Douglas F-15 Eagle, having the performance to take on the point defense interception role, and the strategic threat moved from bombers to intercontinental ballistic missiles (ICBMs). Dedicated interceptor designs became increasingly rare, with the only widely used examples designed after the 1960s being the Panavia Tornado ADV, Mikoyan MiG-25, Mikoyan MiG-31, and the Shenyang J-8.

== History ==
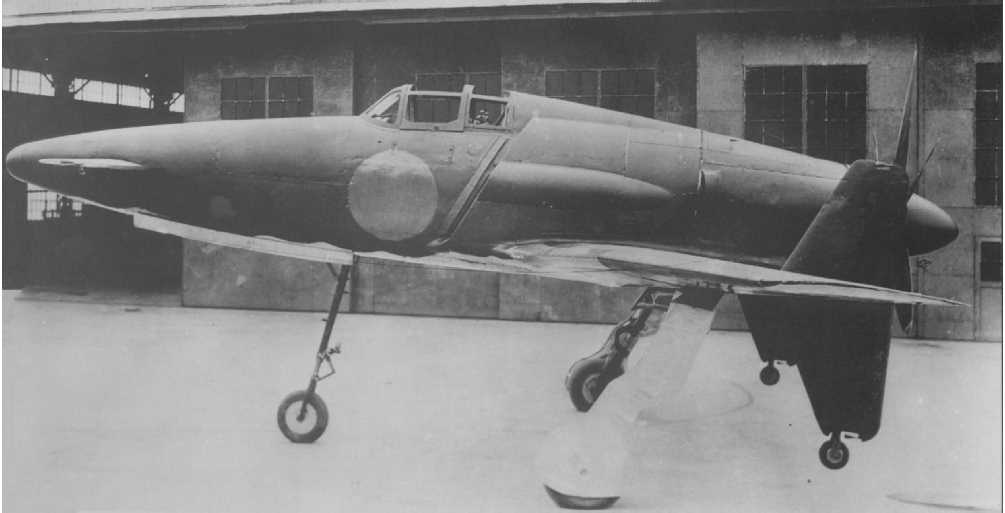
The Kyushu J7W Shinden is a late-war Japanese prototype aircraft that was intended to be used as an interceptor to counter squadrons of Boeing B-29 Superfortress bombers.

The first interceptor squadrons were formed during World War I to defend London against attacks by Zeppelins and later against fixed-wing long-range bombers. Early units generally used aircraft withdrawn from front-line service, notably the Sopwith Pup. They were told about their target's location before take-off from a command centre in the Horse Guards building. The Pup proved to have too low performance to easily intercept Gotha G.IV bombers, and the superior Sopwith Camels supplanted them.

The term "interceptor" was in use by 1929. Through the 1930s, bomber aircraft speeds increased so much that conventional interceptor tactics appeared impossible. Visual and acoustic detection from the ground had a range of only a few miles, which meant that an interceptor would have insufficient time to climb to altitude before the bombers reached their targets. Standing combat air patrols were possible but only at great cost. The conclusion at the time was that "the bomber will always get through".

The invention of radar made possible early, long-range detection of aircraft on the order of 100 miles (160 km), both day and night and in all weather. A typical bomber might take twenty minutes to cross the detection zone of early radar systems, time enough for interceptor fighters to start up, climb to altitude and engage the bombers. Ground controlled interception required constant contact between the interceptor and the ground until the bombers became visible to the pilots and nationwide networks like the Dowding system were built in the late 1930s to coordinate these efforts.

During World War II the effectiveness of interceptor aircraft meant that bombers often needed to be escorted by long range fighter aircraft. Many aircraft were able to be fitted with Aircraft interception radar, further facilitating the interception of enemy aircraft.

The introduction of jet power increased flight speeds from around 300 miles per hour (500 km/h) to around 600 miles per hour (1,000 km/h) in a step and roughly doubled operational altitudes. Although radars also improved in performance, the gap between offense and defense was dramatically reduced. Large attacks could so confuse the defense's ability to communicate with pilots that the classic method of manual ground controlled interception was increasingly seen as inadequate. In the United States, this led to the introduction of the Semi-Automatic Ground Environment to computerize this task, while in the UK it led to enormously powerful radars to improve detection time.

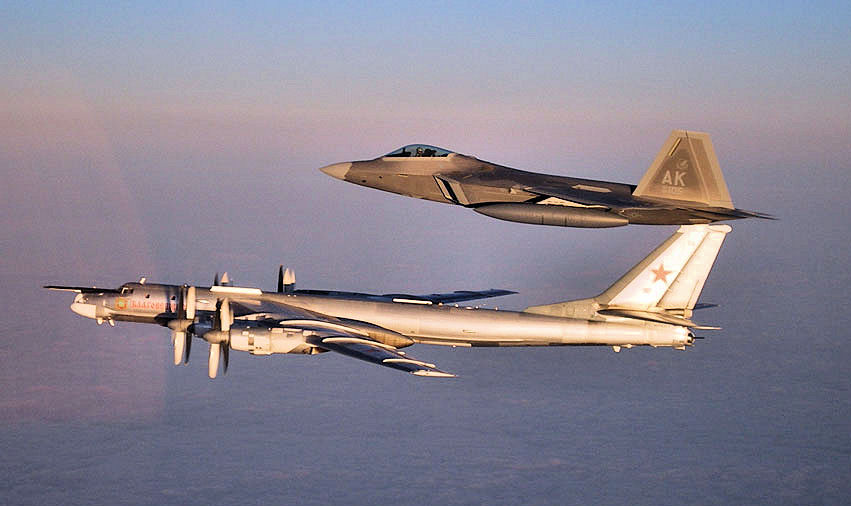
A USAF F-22 Raptor air superiority fighter intercepting a Russian Tu-95 near Alaska

The introduction of the first useful surface to air missiles in the 1950s obviated the need for fast reaction time interceptors as the missile could launch almost instantly. Air forces increasingly turned to much larger interceptor designs, with enough fuel for longer endurance, leaving the point-defense role to the missiles. This led to the abandonment of a number of short-range designs like the Avro Arrow and Convair F-102 in favor of much larger and longer-ranged designs like the North American F-108 and MiG-25.

In the 1950s and 1960s during the Cold War, a strong interceptor force was crucial for the opposing superpowers as it was the best means to defend against an unexpected nuclear attack by strategic bombers. Hence, for a brief period of time they fared rapid development in both speed, range, and altitude. At the end of the 1960s, a nuclear attack became unstoppable with the introduction of ballistic missiles capable of approaching from outside the atmosphere at speeds as high as 3 to 4 miles per second (5 to 7 km/s). The doctrine of mutually assured destruction replaced the trend of defense strengthening, making interceptors less strategically logical. The utility of interceptors waned as the role merged with that of the heavy air superiority fighter.

The interceptor mission is, by its nature, a difficult one. Consider the desire to protect a single target from attack by long-range bombers. The bombers have the advantage of being able to select the parameters of the mission – attack vector, speed and altitude. This results in an enormous area from which the attack can originate. In the time it takes for the bombers to cross the distance from first detection to being on their targets, the interceptor must be able to start, take off, climb to altitude, maneuver for attack and then attack the bomber.

A dedicated interceptor aircraft sacrifices the capabilities of the air superiority fighter and multirole fighter (i.e., countering enemy fighter aircraft in air combat manoeuvring), by tuning its performance for either fast climbs or high speeds. The result is that interceptors often look very impressive on paper, typically outrunning, outclimbing and outgunning slower fighter designs. However, pure interceptors fare poorly in fighter-to-fighter combat against the same "less capable" designs due to limited maneuverability especially at low altitudes and speeds.

=== Point-defense interceptors ===
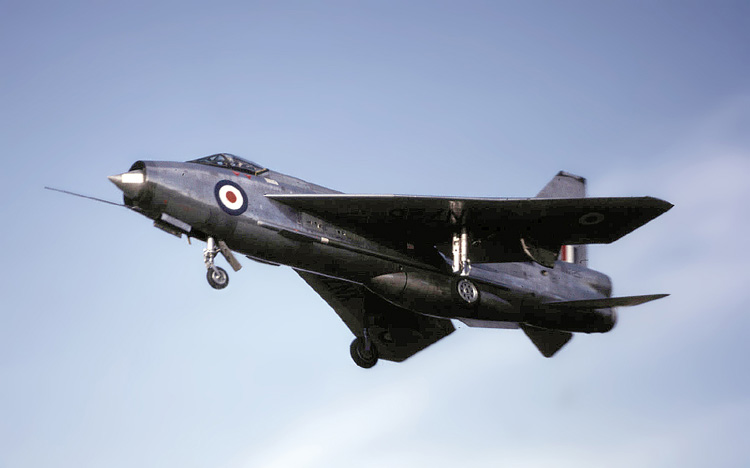
RAF English Electric Lightning point defense interceptor

In the spectrum of various interceptors, one design approach especially shows sacrifices necessary to achieve decisive benefit in a chosen aspect of performance. A "point defense interceptor" is of a lightweight design, intended to spend most of its time on the ground located at the defended target, and able to launch on demand, climb to altitude, manoeuvre and then attack the bomber in a very short time, before the bomber can deploy its weapons.

At the end of Second World War, the Luftwaffe's most critical requirement was for interceptors as the Commonwealth and American air forces pounded German targets night and day. As the bombing effort grew, notably in early 1944, the Luftwaffe introduced a rocket-powered design, the Messerschmitt Me 163 Komet, in the very-short-range interceptor role. The engine allowed about 7 minutes of powered flight, but offered such tremendous performance that they could fly right by the defending fighters. The Me 163 required an airbase, however, which were soon under constant attack. Following the Emergency Fighter Program, the Germans developed even odder designs, such as the Bachem Ba 349 Natter, which launched vertically and thus eliminated the need for an airbase. In general all these initial German designs proved difficult to operate, often becoming death traps for their pilots, and had little effect on the bombing raids. Rocket-boosted variants of both of Germany's jet fighters; the Me 262 in its "C" subtype series, all nicknamed "home protector" (Heimatschützer, in four differing formats) and the planned He 162E subtype, using one of the same BMW 003R turbojet/rocket "mixed-power" engine as the Me 262C-2b Heimatschützer II, but were never produced in quantity.

In the initial stage of Cold War, bombers were expected to attack flying higher and faster, even at transonic speeds. Initial transonic and supersonic fighters had modest internal fuel tanks in their slim fuselages, but a very high fuel consumption. This led fighter prototypes emphasizing acceleration and operational ceiling, with a sacrifice on the loiter time, essentially limiting them to point defense role. Such were the mixed jet/rocket power Republic XF-91 or Saunders Roe SR.53. The Soviet and Western trials with zero-length launch were also related. None of these found practical use. Designs that depended solely on jet engines achieved more success with the F-104 Starfighter (initial A version) and the English Electric Lightning.

The role of crewed point defense designs was reassigned to uncrewed interceptors—surface-to-air missiles (SAMs)—which first reached an adequate level in 1954–1957. SAM advancements ended the concept of massed high-altitude bomber operations, in favor of penetrators (and later cruise missiles) flying a combination of techniques colloquially known as "flying below the radar". By flying terrain masking low-altitude nap-of-the-earth flight profiles the effective range, and therefore reaction time, of ground-based radar was limited to at best the radar horizon. In the case of ground radar systems this can be countered by placing radar systems on mountain tops to extend the radar horizon, or through placing high performance radars in interceptors or in AWACS aircraft used to direct point defense interceptors.

=== Area defense ===
As capabilities continued to improve – especially through the widespread introduction of the jet engine and the adoption of high speed, low level flight profiles, the time available between detection and interception dropped. Most advanced point defence interceptors combined with long-range radars were struggling to keep the reaction time down enough to be effective. Fixed times, like the time needed for the pilot to climb into the cockpit, became an increasing portion of the overall mission time, there were few ways to reduce this. During the Cold War in times of heightened tensions, quick reaction alert (QRA) aircraft were kept piloted, fully fueled and armed, with the engines running at idle on the runway ready to take off. The aircraft being kept topped up with fuel via hoses from underground fuel tanks. If a possible intruder was identified, the aircraft would be ready to take off as soon as the external fuel lines were detached. However, keeping QRA aircraft at this state of readiness was physically and mentally draining to the pilots and was expensive in terms of fuel.

As an alternative, longer-range designs with extended loiter times were considered. These area defense interceptors or area defense fighters were in general larger designs intended to stay on lengthy patrol and protect a much larger area from attack, depending on greater detection capabilities, both in the aircraft themselves and operating with AWACS, rather than high speed to reach targets. The exemplar of this concept was the Tupolev Tu-28. The later Panavia Tornado ADV was able to achieve long range in a smaller airframe through the use of more efficient engines. Rather than focusing on acceleration and climb rate, the design emphasis is on range and missile carrying capacity, which together translate into combat endurance, look-down/shoot-down radars good enough to detect and track fast moving interdictors against ground clutter, and the capability to provide guidance to air-to-air missiles (AAM) against these targets. High speed and acceleration was put into long-range and medium-range AAMs, and agility into short range dog fighting AAMs, rather than into the aircraft themselves. They were first to introduce all-weather avionics, assuring successful operations during night, rain, snow, or fog.

Countries that were strategically dependent on surface fleet, most notably US and UK, maintained also fleet defense fighters, such as the F-14 Tomcat.

== Development ==
=== Soviet Union and Russia ===
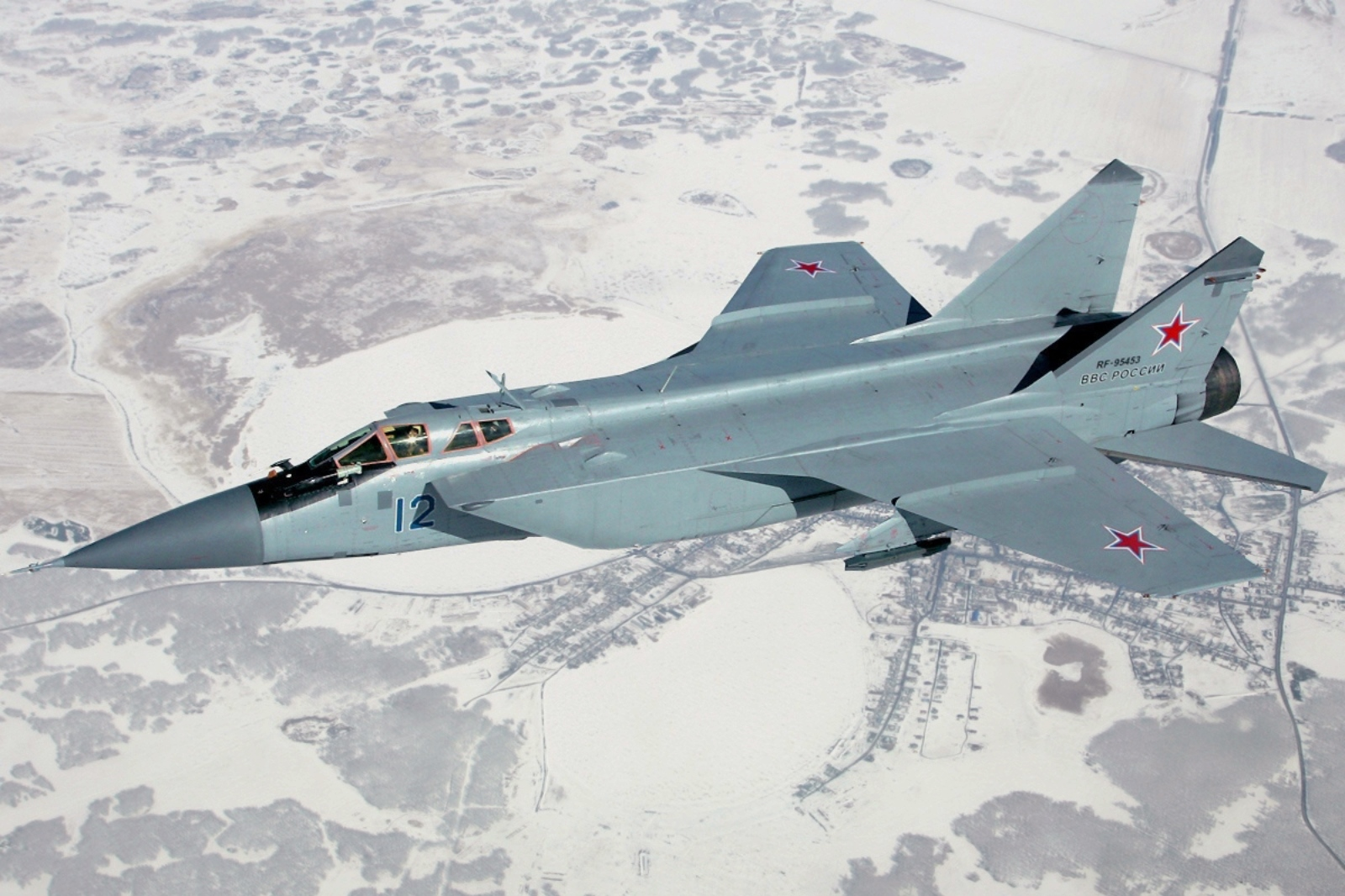
Mikoyan MiG-31

During the Cold War, an entire military service, not just an arm of the pre-existing air force, was designated for deployment of interceptors. The aircraft of the Soviet Air Defence Forces (PVO-S) differed from those of the Soviet Air Forces (VVS) in that they were by no means small or crudely simple, but huge and refined with large, sophisticated radars; they could not take off from grass, only concrete runways; they could not be disassembled and shipped back to a maintenance center in a boxcar. Similarly, their pilots were given less training in combat maneuvers, and more in radio-directed pursuit.

The Soviets' main interceptor was initially the Su-9, which was followed by the Su-15 and the MiG-25 "Foxbat". The auxiliary Tu-128, an area range interceptor, was notably the heaviest fighter aircraft ever to see service in the world. The latest and most advanced interceptor aircraft in the Soviet (now Russian) inventory is the MiG-31 "Foxhound". Improving on some of the flaws on the proceeding MiG-25, the MiG-31 has better low altitude and low speed performance, in addition to carrying an internal cannon.

Russia, despite merging the PVO into the VVS, continues to maintain its dedicated MiG-31 interceptor fleet.

=== United States ===
In 1937, USAAC lieutenants Gordon P. Saville and Benjamin S. Kelsey devised a pair of proposals for interceptor aircraft, the first such designation in the US. One proposal was for a single-engine fighter, the other for a twin-engine. Both were required to reach an altitude of 20,000 feet (6,100 m) in six minutes as a defense against bomber attack. Kelsey said later that he used the interceptor designation to sidestep a hard USAAC policy restricting fighters to 500 pounds (230 kg) of armament. He wished for at least 1,000 pounds (450 kg) of armament so that American fighters could dominate their battles against all opponents, fighters included. The two aircraft resulting from these proposals were the single-engine Bell P-39 Airacobra and the twin-engine Lockheed P-38 Lightning. Both aircraft were successful during World War II in standard fighter roles, not specifically assigned to point defense against bombers.

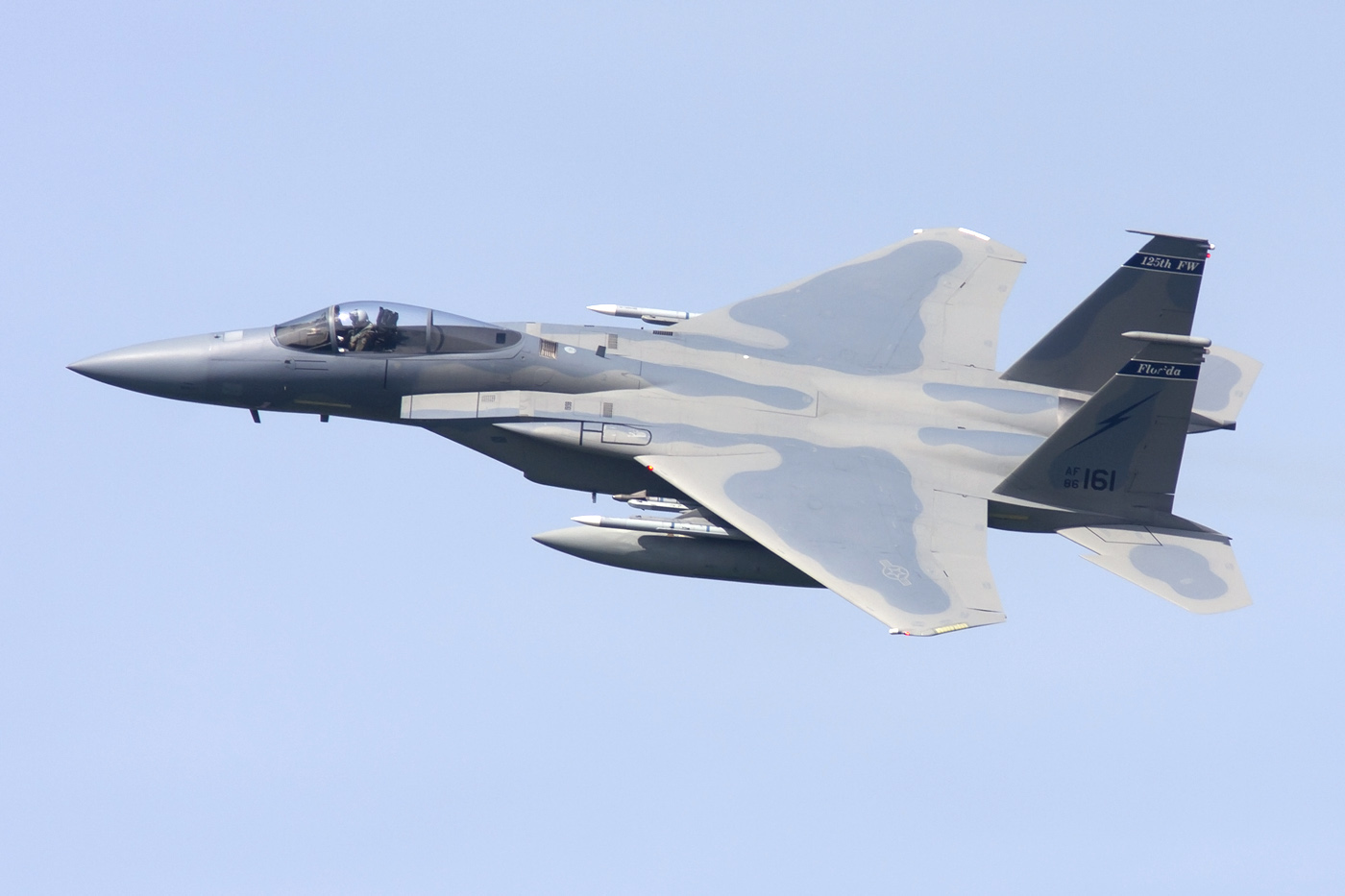
A USAF F-15C

From 1946 to 1980 the United States maintained a dedicated Aerospace Defense Command, consisting primarily of dedicated interceptors. Many post-war designs were of limited performance, including designs like the F-86D and F-89 Scorpion. In the late 1940s ADC started a project to build a much more advanced interceptor under the 1954 interceptor effort, which eventually delivered the F-106 Delta Dart after a lengthy development process. Further replacements were studied, notably the NR-349 proposal during the 1960s, but came to nothing as the USSR strengthened their strategic force with ICBMs. Hence, the F-106 ended up serving as the primary USAF interceptor into the 1980s.

As the F-106 was retired, intercept missions were assigned to the contemporary F-15 and F-16 fighters, among their other roles. The F-16, however, was originally designed for air superiority while evolving into a versatile multirole fighter. The F-15, with its Mach 2.5 maximum speed enabling it to intercept the fastest enemy aircraft (namely the MiG-25 Foxbat), is also not a pure interceptor as it has exceptional agility for dogfighting based upon the lessons learned from Vietnam; the F-15E Strike Eagle variant adds air interdiction while retaining the interception and air-to-air combat of other F-15s. Presently, the F-22 is the USA's latest combat aircraft that serves in part as an interceptor due to its Mach 2+ speed as well as supercruise capabilities, however it was designed primarily as a stealth air superiority fighter.

In the 1950s, the United States Navy led an unsuccessful F6D Missileer project. Later it launched the development of a large F-111B fleet air defense fighter, but this project was cancelled too. Finally, the role was assigned to the F-14 Tomcat, carrying AIM-54 Phoenix missiles. Like the USAF's F-15, the USN's F-14 was also designed primarily as an air superiority (fighter-to-fighter combat) and F-14s served the interceptor role until it received upgrades in the 1990s for ground attack. Both the fighter and the Phoenix missile were retired in 2006.

=== United Kingdom ===
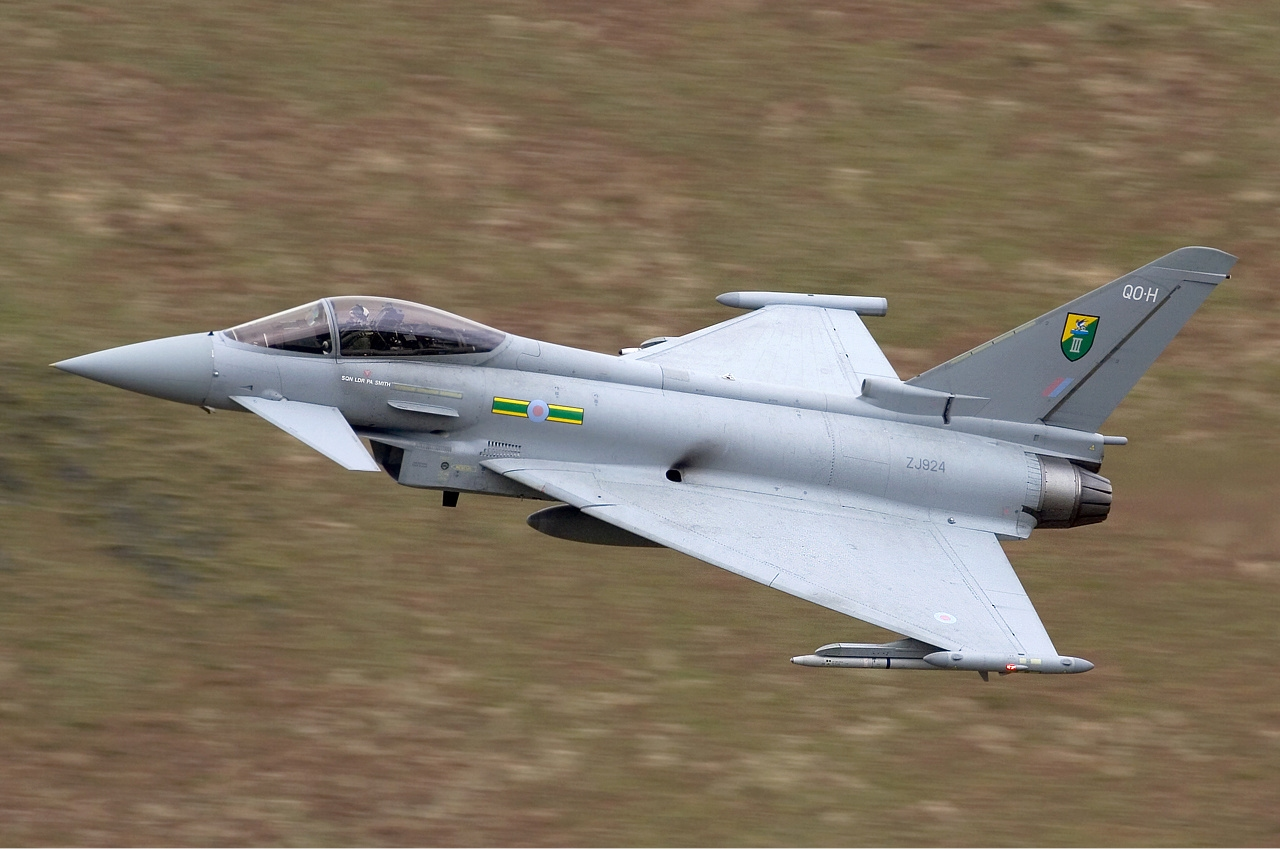
A Eurofighter Typhoon with the RAF

The British Royal Air Force operated a supersonic day fighter, the English Electric Lightning, alongside the Gloster Javelin in the subsonic night/all-weather role. Efforts to replace the Javelin with a supersonic design under Operational Requirement F.155 came to naught. The UK operated its own, highly adapted version of the McDonnell Douglas F-4 Phantom as its primary interceptor from the mid-1970s, with the air defence variant (ADV) of the Panavia Tornado being introduced in the 1980s. The Tornado was eventually replaced with a multirole design, the Eurofighter Typhoon.

=== China ===
The Shenyang J-8 is a high-speed, high-altitude Chinese-built single-seat interceptor. Initially designed in the early 1960s to counter US-built B-58 Hustler bombers, F-105 Thunderchief fighter-bombers and Lockheed U-2 reconnaissance planes, it still retains the ability to 'sprint' at Mach 2+ speeds, and later versions can carry medium-range PL-12/SD-10 MRAAM missiles for interception purposes. The PLAAF/PLANAF currently still operates approximately 300 or so J-8s of various configurations.

=== Other countries ===
Several other countries also introduced interceptor designs, although in the 1950s–1960s several planned interceptors never came to fruition, with the expectation that missiles would replace bombers.

The Argentine FMA I.Ae. 37 was a prototype jet fighter developed during the 1950s. It never flew and was cancelled in 1960.

The Canadian subsonic Avro Canada CF-100 Canuck served in numbers through 1950s. Its supersonic replacement, the CF-105 Arrow ("Avro Arrow"), was controversially cancelled in 1959.

The Swedish Saab 35 Draken was specifically designed for intercepting aircraft passing Swedish airspace at high altitudes in the event of a war between the Soviet Union and NATO. With the advent of low flying cruise-missiles and high-altitude AA-missiles the flight profile was changed, but regained the interceptor profile with the final version J 35J.

== See also ==
- Anti-aircraft warfare
- Escort fighter
- Point defense
- Interception procedure
