= Gordon P. Saville =

United States Air Force general

Gordon Philip Saville
- Major General Gordon Philip Saville
- Born: September 14, 1902; Macon, Georgia, US
- Died: January 31, 1984 (aged 81); Lackland Air Force Base, Bexar County, Texas, US
- Military career
- Allegiance: United States
- Branch: U.S. Army Reserve; U.S. Army Air Corps; U.S. Army Air Forces; United States Air Force
- Service years: 1923–1951
- Rank: Major General
- Commands: XII Fighter Command; First Tactical Air Force; III Tactical Air Command; Air Defense Command
- Conflicts: World War II
- Awards: Distinguished Flying Cross; Distinguished Service Medal (2); Bronze Star Medal; Legion of Merit; Air Medal

Gordon Philip Saville (September 14, 1902 – January 31, 1984) was a United States Air Force major general who was the top authority on US air defense from 1940 to 1951. Blunt and direct in manner, Saville had been an outspoken proponent of tactical aviation in the 1930s against a brotherhood of airmen who promoted strategic bombing.

Saville succeeded Claire L. Chennault as America's leading fighter aircraft tactician. With Benjamin S. Kelsey, Saville co-wrote the technical specifications which led to the Lockheed P-38 Lightning and the Bell P-39 Airacobra fighters. In 1949 he selected the North American F-86 Sabre as America's main defense fighter, and in 1950 he approved a guided air-to-air missile system that would be carried aboard the proposed supersonic 1954 interceptor; the missile produced was the AIM-4 Falcon.

Saville was a technical and scientific-minded leader who helped pioneer advanced mathematics for operations research, and computer systems for centralized coordination of air defense. He advocated the expansion of radar installations to create an unbroken air defense network. He explored the concept of a military aircraft designed around an integrated electronics fire-control system built by various subcontractors. After retiring from the military, Saville worked in the defense industry.

== Early career ==
Gordon Philip Saville was born in Macon, Georgia, on September 14, 1902. His Regular Army officer father propelled Saville's older brother to enroll at the United States Military Academy at West Point, and he urged Saville to accept an appointment to the United States Naval Academy. However, Saville wanted to fly so he rejected formal military schools. Instead, he attended the University of Washington, Antioch College, and then the University of California and was commissioned a second lieutenant in the United States Army Reserve on November 5, 1923, in the infantry, seeing active duty in August 1924 and August 1925. While on reserve duty at Crissy Field in San Francisco, Saville watched Army Air Service pilots training on military aircraft. He determined that he would join them or leave the military.

Saville became a flying cadet with the Army Air Service in March 1926, and entered the primary flying school at Brooks Field, Texas. During this time his service branch reformed as the United States Army Air Corps (USAAC). In September of that year he was transferred to the advanced flying school at Kelly Field, Texas, from which he graduated on February 28, 1927, gaining a commission as second lieutenant in the Air Reserve. He was assigned to the Fifth Observation Squadron at Mitchel Field, New York and in June 1927, he was appointed a second lieutenant in the Air Corps of the Regular Army. At Mitchel, Saville served ably as adjutant to Lieutenant Colonel Benjamin Foulois, but Foulois was unhappy with Saville's absence during weekend train trips to Connecticut to see Ina Isola Hards, his girlfriend. Hards was an honors graduate of Wellesley College where she had performed in theatre plays and had served as class officer. Foulois' wife successfully addressed the problem by inviting Miss Hards to stay at the Foulois home on weekends. Saville married Hards in the Church of Transfiguration in New York City in September 1928; her father, Ira A. Hards, producer of the Mae West Broadway play Diamond Lil, walked her down the aisle. As a wedding present, Foulois granted Saville's request for a transfer back to Crissy Field.

Saville was made adjutant of Crissy Field in December 1928. He and his wife produced a daughter in July 1930, Ina Gordon Saville. Later that year Saville transferred to Mather Field, California, where he was appointed adjutant of the field and of the 20th Pursuit Group. The Savilles had a son, Edward A. Saville, in October 1931. In 1932, Saville and family traveled to Barksdale Field, Louisiana, along with the 20th Pursuit Group.

== Tactics and theory ==
At Foulois' recommendation, Saville entered the Air Corps Tactical School at Maxwell Field, Alabama, in August 1933. Saville graduated in May 1934, at the top of his class, and remained at the school as an instructor in the Maps and Photographs Section. At ACTS, Saville joined Claire L. Chennault in favoring an air defense strategy hinging on a strong fighter force. Saville argued against the so-called Bomber Mafia; he did not believe that fleets of bombers were unstoppable, and he considered close coordination between ground units and tactical air power a key part of Army doctrine. In July 1935, at the temporary rank of captain, he was named recorder of the Air Corps Board at Maxwell Field, in addition to his duties as fighter aviation instructor. Saville removed a degree of independent command from fighter squadron leaders who previously could ignore instructions radioed from the ground. Backed by Brigadier General Henry Conger Pratt, Saville's unpopular control methods proved their worth, as ground controllers were often in possession of better information than squadron leaders in flight. From 1935 to 1937, as Chennault was eased out by the bomber advocates, Saville took his place as the top fighter proponent. Saville avoided Chennault's fate by refraining from disputing the bomber's important role in offensive operations. He felt that the fighter aircraft was undervalued in its defensive role.

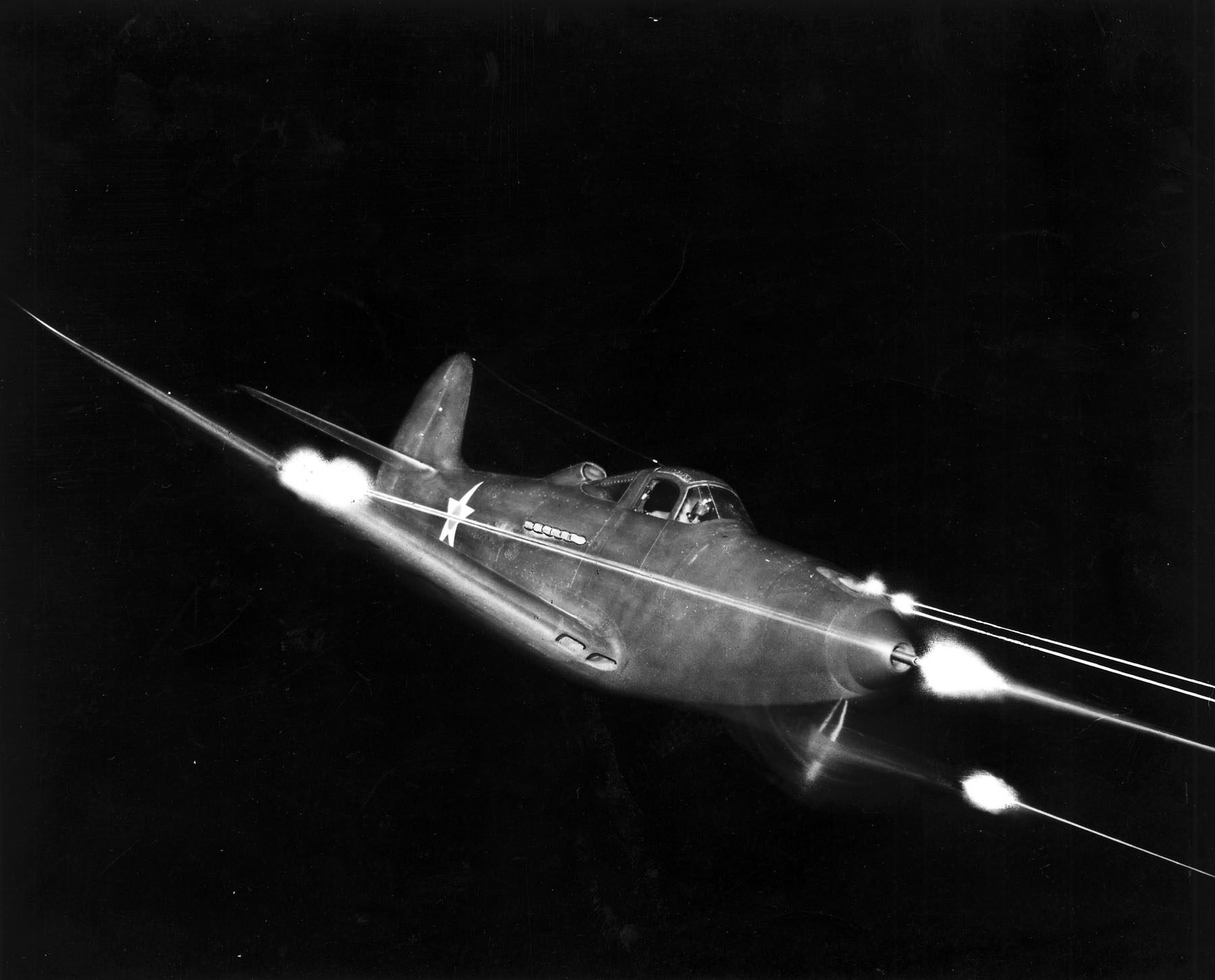
Saville helped specify the Bell P-39 Airacobra, designed around a large autocannon

In February 1937, Saville paired with Lieutenant Benjamin S. Kelsey, Project Officer for Fighters at the USAAC, to find a way to get around the USAAC's arbitrary 500-pound (225 kg) limit on the weight of fighter aircraft armament. The two men settled on the term "interceptor", creating a new Army classification for fighters, not a new mission. They issued a specification for two new heavily armed fighters via Circular Proposal X-608 and Circular Proposal X-609. These were requests for fighters having "the tactical mission of interception and attack of hostile aircraft at high altitude". Specifications called for at least 1,000 pounds (450 kg) of heavy armament including a cannon, one or two liquid-cooled Allison V-1710 engines each with a General Electric turbo-supercharger, tricycle landing gear, a level airspeed of at least 360 miles per hour (580 km/h) at altitude, and a climb to 20,000 feet (6,100 m) within 6 minutes—the toughest set of specifications USAAC had presented to that date. From these specifications a competition was held, and eventually the single-engine fighter became the Bell Aircraft P-39 Airacobra, and the twin-engine fighter became the Lockheed P-38 Lightning. Saville's rank of captain was made permanent in June 1937.

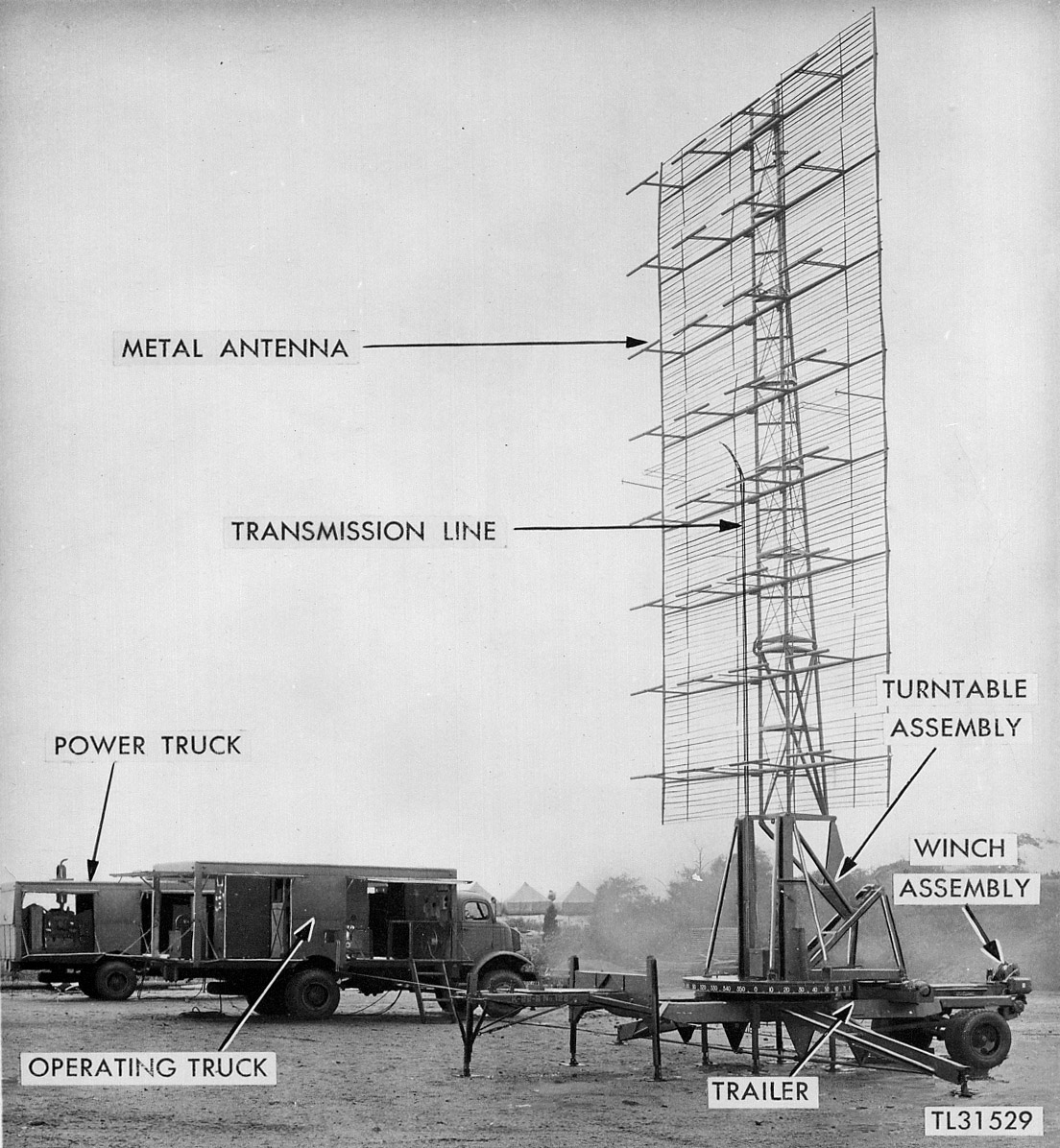
Saville was an early proponent of radar such as this SCR-270 set

Saville entered the Command and General Staff School at Fort Leavenworth, Kan., in September 1938, and graduated the following June. He then was assigned to Washington, D.C., as assistant to the chief of the Plans Division in the Office of the Chief of Air Corps. He assumed the role of assistant intelligence and operations officer of the Air Defense Command (ADC) at Mitchel Field in March 1940. Led by Brigadier General James E. Chaney, the ADC was tasked with testing various air defense measures to determine what worked. Chaney was unfamiliar with air defense, and he made Saville the coordinator of all projects. This was the first time Saville was able to test and implement his theories on a large scale. New SCR-270 radar units were tried out and incorporated into the command scheme, giving greater reach to ground controllers. Army maneuvers held at Watertown, New York, in August 1940 allowed Saville to prove that fighter aircraft could protect a domestic target from air attack long before anti-aircraft artillery could fire, a result that Chaney said "astonished" high-ranking Army observers.

In October 1940, Saville flew to London with Chaney for temporary duty as a military air observer studying British air defenses, and returned to Mitchel Field after two months to become executive officer at the temporary rank of major of the First Interceptor Command. He began drafting a comprehensive air defense doctrine which combined features of the British system with those advocated by Chennault and himself. Saville was promoted to the permanent rank of major in February, 1941, and from March 25 to April 12, he conducted an intensive course in air defense given to 60 fighter group staff, including Kenneth P. Bergquist, posted to Hawaii's fighter wing. In August 1941, he returned to London and observed British air defense measures until December 1941. During this time, Saville's Air Defense Doctrine draft was reviewed by the USAAC, but it was not approved or published. Saville's proposed defense involved rigorous round-the-clock coordination between ground observers, radar installations, and centralized command posts to filter reports to defense forces consisting of anti-aircraft artillery batteries, barrage balloons, and fighter wings. Unusually, Saville proposed that fighter wings involved in air defense be completely separate from fighter wings making attacks on enemy air forces.

== World War II ==
After the attack on Pearl Harbor, Saville was assigned to United States Army Air Forces (USAAF) headquarters in Washington as director of the country's air defenses, which he considered inadequate. Because of the greatly increased civilian interest in air defense, much of Saville's unpublished air defense doctrine was copied into the War Department's Training Circulars No. 70 and 71, published nine and eleven days after Pearl Harbor, respectively. These training materials emphasized regional command and control of air defenses. Fighter group commanders were to direct the efforts of anti-aircraft artillery officers—one of Saville's suggestions that had been a sticking point, resisted by artillerists. Before these plans were implemented, British radar pioneer Robert Watson-Watt surveyed West Coast defenses and found them "dangerously unsatisfactory", a confirmation of Saville's assessment. Saville found Watson-Watt's report "a damning indictment of our whole warning service."

Saville was made lieutenant colonel on January 5, 1942. In tackling the problem of air defense of the Panama Canal Zone, he brought together civilian mathematicians and military defense experts to organize the first operations research group in the Air Corps, following two such groups formed by the Navy. Saville was promoted to brigadier general on November 2.

Once it was clear that U.S. territory was not in danger of being attacked by enemy air units, Saville's expertise in air defense was not needed. In March 1943, he was made director of tactical development at the Army Air Forces School of Applied Tactics (AAFSAT) at Orlando, Florida, where he reorganized the Army Air Forces Board by July 2, 1943. Saville's structure put tactical and strategic development on equal footing, and tied together the efforts of the Chief of Air Staff for Operations, Commitments, and Requirements (OC&R), the Proving Ground Command and the School of Applied Tactics. Saville charged the AAFSAT with developing air defense doctrines and tactics, and with the testing of air defense equipment and methods.

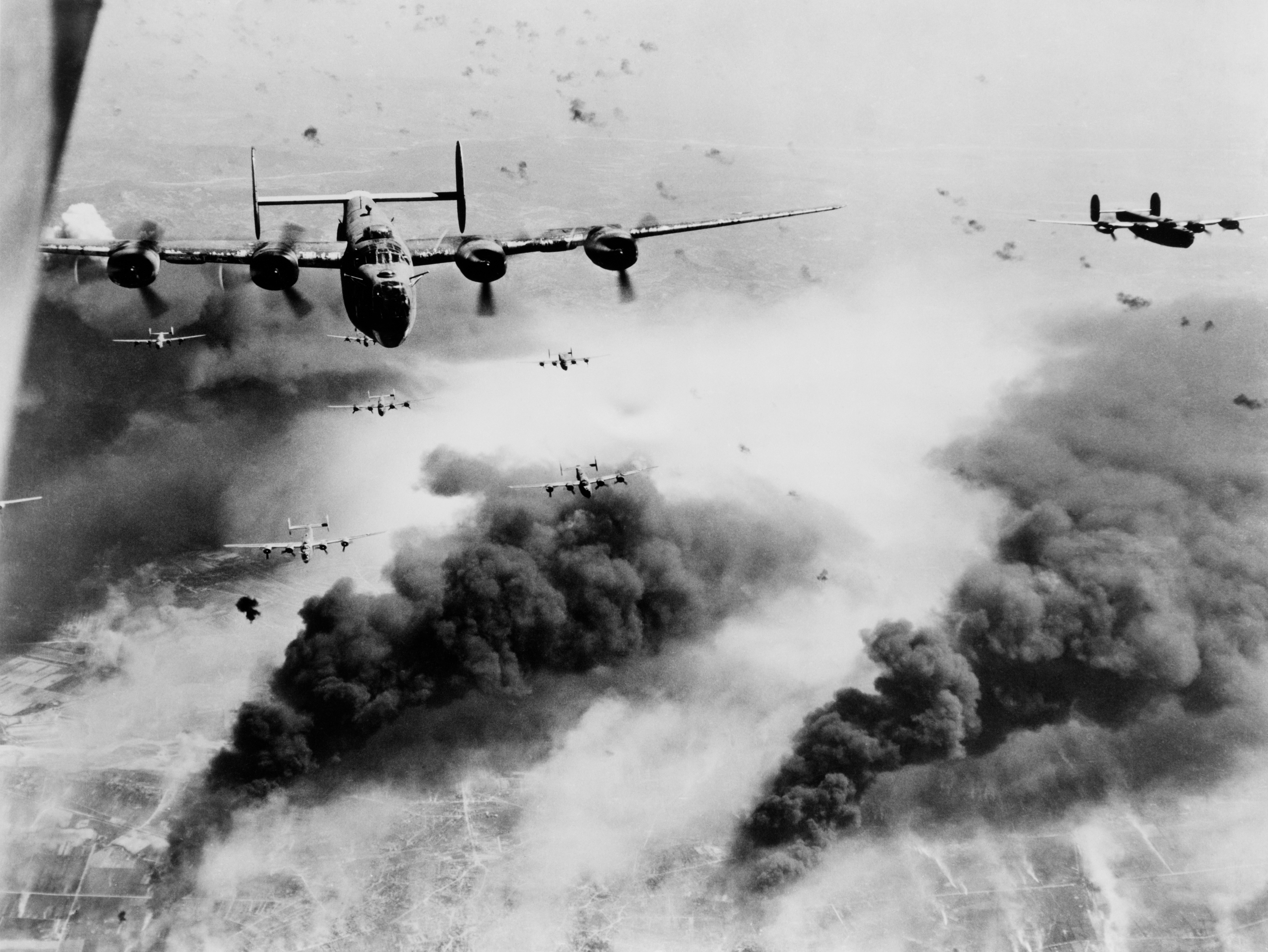
Saville thought Operation Tidal Wave was a "suicidal" plan.

Later that month he was ordered to the North African theater, where he served as chief of staff of the Mediterranean Air Command. Under Carl Andrew Spaatz, Saville argued against the plans for Operation Tidal Wave in August, the air attack on oil refineries in Ploieşti. After the operation resulted in heavy American casualties with little effect on oil production, Saville described it as a "goddamned thing... ridiculous and suicidal."

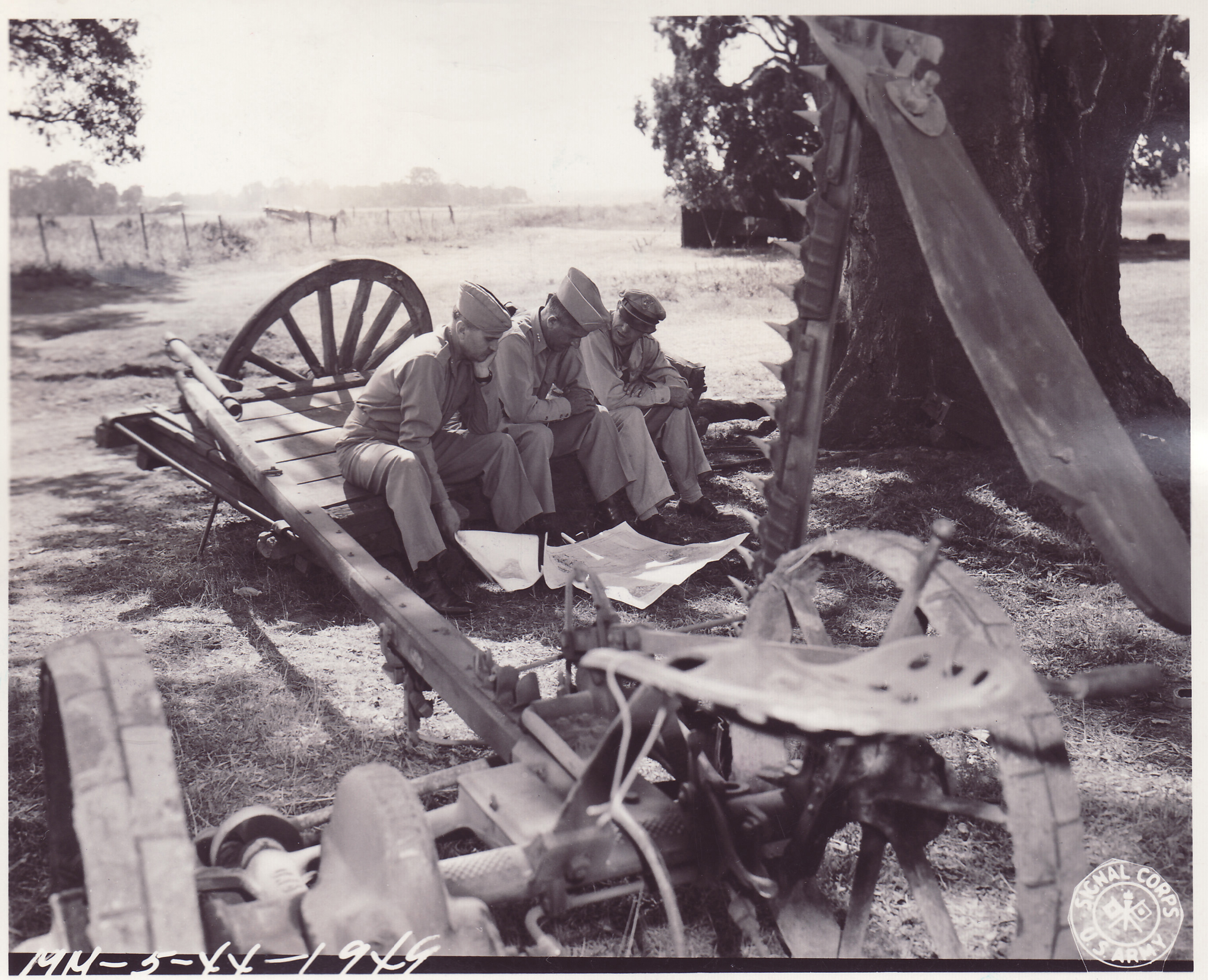
General officer conference on Corsica in June 1944: Saville (left) joins Jacob L. Devers and John K. Cannon in planning the invasion of Southern France

In October 1943, he was appointed commander of the XII Fighter Command (XXII Tactical Air Command), and in January 1944 was named deputy commander of the XII Air Support Command (XII Tactical Air Command) in the Mediterranean. There, Saville achieved close coordination between air power and the infantry. Tactics used by Saville were employed again during the Normandy Invasion, with fighter aircraft clearing enemy units from roads behind the front lines. He took part in Operation Strangle, the effort to deny roads and rail to German supply columns. In this, Saville was critical of the inaccuracy of high-altitude bombing; he wrote privately to a friend in April, "Our waste of effort in trying to hit railroad tracks and bridges is simply fantastic." Saville was promoted to major general on June 30, 1944, distinguishing himself during Operation Dragoon, the invasion of Southern France. He assumed command of the First Tactical Air Force in January 1945.

The following month, Saville returned to the United States for temporary assignment to USAAF headquarters, and in March 1945 became commander of the III Tactical Air Command at Barksdale Field. Two months later, he was appointed deputy commander of Air Transport Command at Washington.

== Cold War ==
In January 1947, Saville was sent to Brazil to serve as chief of the Air Section of the Joint Brazil – United States Military Commission, stationed at the American Embassy at Rio de Janeiro. Saville took his family with him to Brazil; he enrolled his daughter in the American School of Rio de Janeiro, where she graduated high school in June. During this time the USAAF reformed as an independent service branch; United States Air Force (USAF).

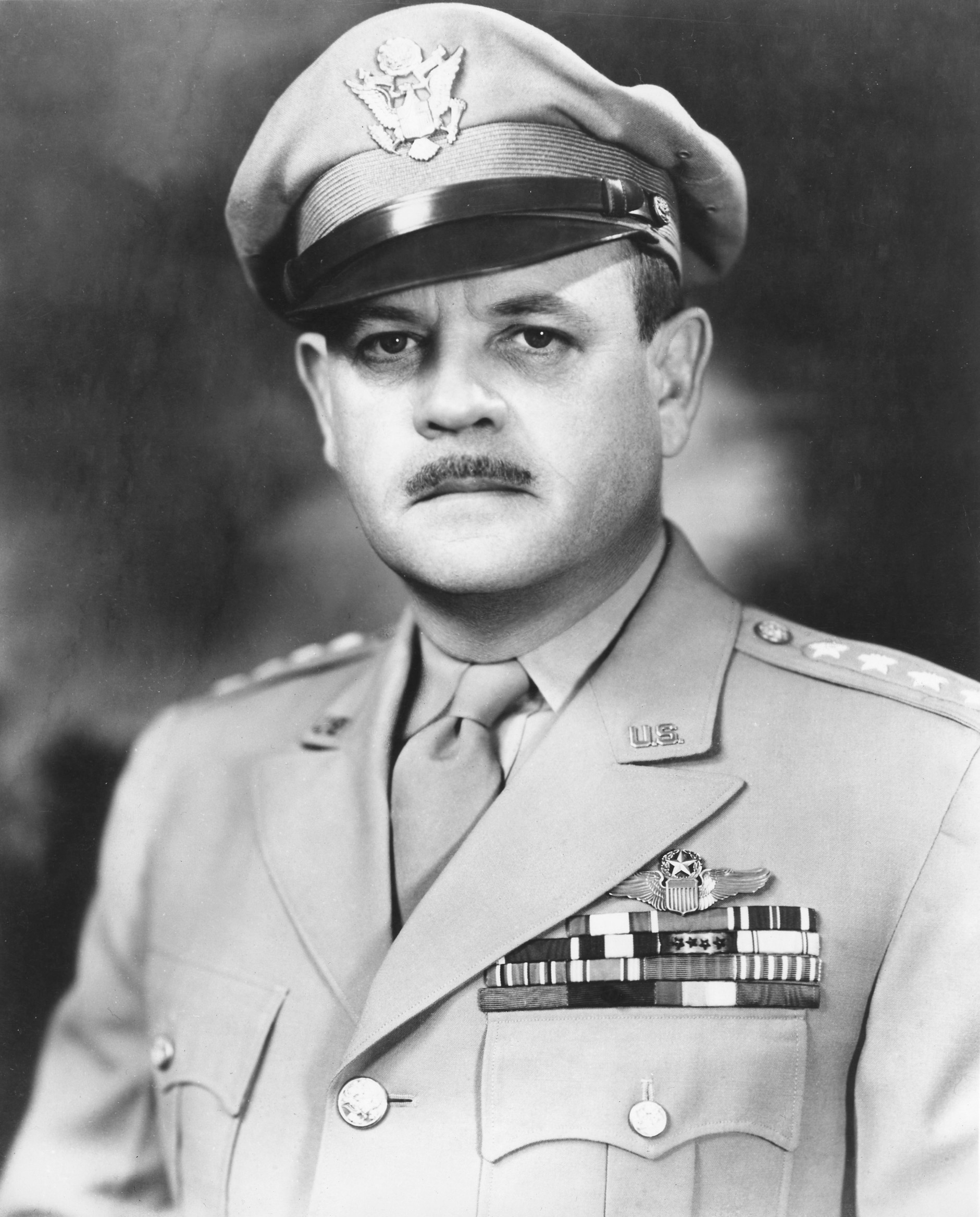
Muir S. Fairchild urged Saville to rework U.S. air defenses

In May 1948, Muir S. Fairchild was made vice chief of staff of the USAF. In light of the developing Cold War and the threat of Soviet long-range bombers, Fairchild determined that Saville's expertise was critically needed. Fairchild ordered Saville, the top U.S. authority on air defense and a scientifically minded pragmatist, to return stateside in June 1948, for assignment to the ADC headquarters at Mitchel Air Force Base.

Saville evaluated the ambitious Radar Fence Plan of Major General Francis L. Ankenbrandt, which had recently failed in Congress because it was too expensive in manpower and material, and would take too long to put in place. Fairchild and Saville determined to devise a more practical radar defense plan, one that would bypass the slow approval methods previously established. In pushing his plan to fruition, Saville angered other officers who expected to have a say in air defense; he said, "I wasn't going to stand in line and wait." He first focused on a foundation of radar systems, and concluded that the U.S. should spend $116 million in 1949 and 1950, to build 75 radar sites and 20 control centers in the continental U.S., with 10 more radar sites facing the Soviet Union from the Territory of Alaska, controlled through a territorial center. The radar sites would primarily be composed of older World War II-era microwave units, but these would be augmented by a few advanced radar units, carefully positioned. Dubbed the "Lashup" plan (from "lash-up", meaning "hastily improvised"), it was about 20% of the cost of Ankenbrandt's Radar Fence Plan, and it was more flexible in terms of future expansion.

In September, Saville told Secretary of Defense James Forrestal, Secretary of the Air Force Stuart Symington, and the assembled Air Force staff that America's air defenses were wholly inadequate. The Chiefs of Staff agreed that air defense was second in importance only to a strong retaliation force, one that would give pause to an aggressor. In November, Saville was named commanding general of ADC. He worked to combine it with Tactical Air Command (TAC) to form the backbone of the Continental Air Command (CONAC) organization. In February 1949, Saville updated the House Armed Services Committee on the necessity of radar air defense, and in March the Lashup plan was approved by Congress.

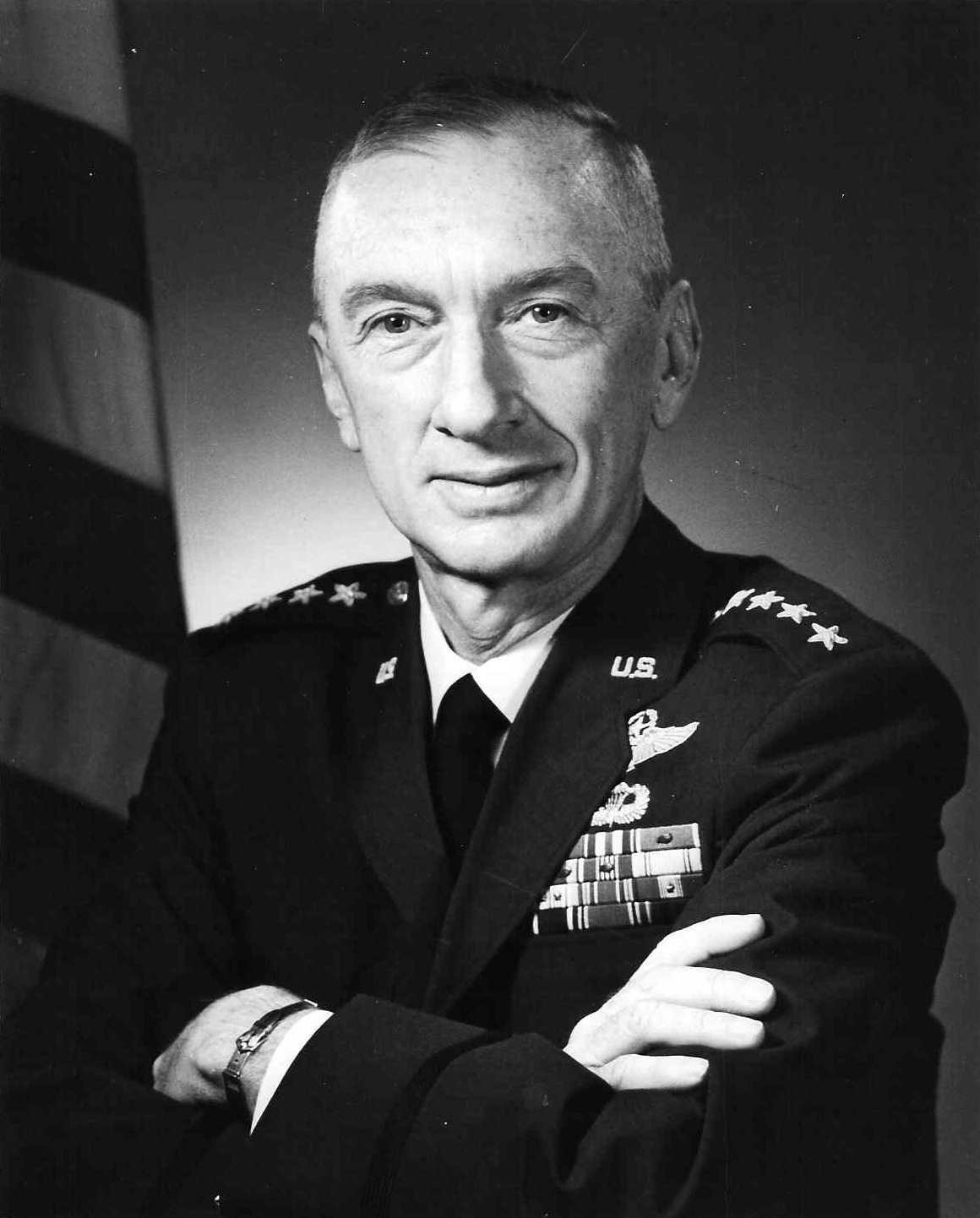
Bruce K. Holloway helped Saville with fighter defenses

Earlier, in mid-1948, Saville asked Colonel Bruce K. Holloway to evaluate existing fighter aircraft defense capabilities. Holloway teamed with Major General William E. Kepner, commander of the Air Proving Ground at Eglin Air Force Base, to measure interceptor performance under realistic conditions. Tests showed that the Northrop P-61 Black Widow, the Lockheed P-80 Shooting Star and the North American F-82 Twin Mustang, then in service, were completely inadequate to stop high-altitude bomber attacks at night or in bad weather. Fairchild learned of this failure and formed a team to evaluate two prototype interceptors, the Northrop XP-89 Scorpion and the Curtiss-Wright XP-87 Blackhawk, in October 1948. As a member of the team, Holloway was disappointed with the performance of the prototypes, and he recommended that both aircraft be refused for air defense. Fairchild canceled the Curtiss machine but the Northrop, the "best of a poor lot", was pushed into immediate service. Holloway and Saville agreed that America needed a fighter that could take off under "zero-zero" conditions of no visibility, and they felt that such a design should be in production by 1954, when the Soviets were expected to have fleets of bombers. Until then, an interim solution was sought. In a May 1949 meeting of the USAF Senior Officers Board, Saville recommended that the North American F-86 Sabre be procured in quantity, as it was in his opinion the best available American all-weather fighter for air defense. The government quickly ordered 124 F-86D interceptors, as a start.

In April 1949, General Ennis Whitehead was put in charge of CONAC. He devised his own command methods rather than those established by Saville, making Saville redundant in his role as air defense chief. In support of Saville, Colonel Jacob E. Smart, assistant to USAF Commander Henry H. Arnold, wrote that Saville's unorthodox methods since the end of World War II provided "the only tangible results toward building an air defense system" of any worth. Smart said that Saville, though a "thorn in the side to many people", should be credited for all recent air defense progress in the U.S. Saville was moved from air defense operations to long-range planning and research. In September 1949, Arnold appointed Saville head of the newly established Directorate of Requirements in the Office of the Deputy Chief of Staff for Operations at USAF headquarters. The following January, Saville became deputy chief of staff for Development, Air Research and Development Command, a new staff section at USAF headquarters. To equip the U.S. with a fighter that could defend against the new threat of Soviet nuclear bombers, Saville initiated a design competition for a fire-control system (FCS) codenamed MX-1179, the basis of a guided air-to-air missile system simple enough that it could be operated alone by the pilot of a supersonic fighter rather than by a weapons officer. The proposed fighter concept was referred to as the 1954 interceptor, resulting directly in the 1956 Convair F-102 Delta Dagger, and several other fighter models indirectly. Saville was less concerned with the aircraft details than with the weapons system; regarding the FCS he said, "when that system is developed, we're going to put aluminum around it, engines on it, and a pilot to run the aluminum, and that is the interceptor."

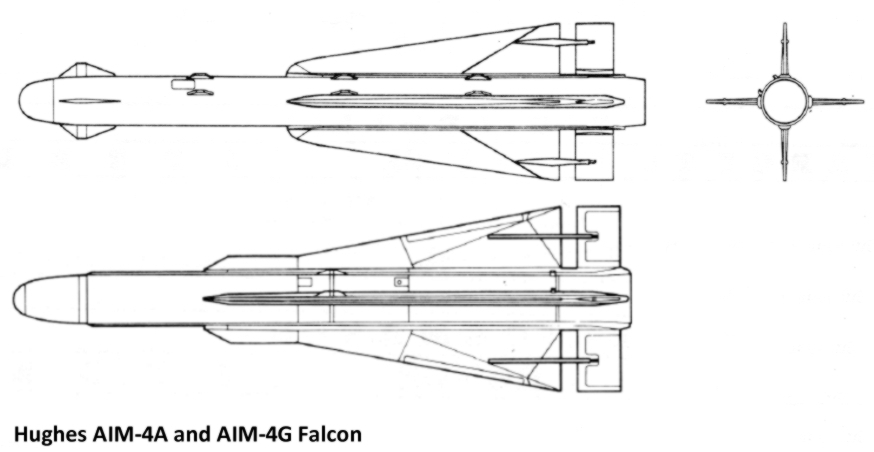
Early and later models of the AIM-4 Falcon

From a handful of company designs, Saville selected Hughes Aircraft to make the FCS. Saville worked closely with Dr. Ruben F. Mettler of Hughes, to lay out the desired strategy of the weapons system and to describe the expected fighter tactics. This weapon would eventually be developed as the AIM-4 Falcon after much urging by Saville. The Falcon was used successfully for more than a decade, beginning in 1956. Designing an aircraft around a weapons system was something Saville had witnessed in the development of Bell's P-39 Airacobra around a large autocannon, but he further refined the concept and made it a requirement for government contractors, a practice that is continued to this day. Saville put an end to specific design goals in aircraft requests for proposal (RFPs); instead, he briefed potential designers on general requirements and discussed with them the defense problems the aircraft was to solve.

In early 1950, Saville served on the Guided Missiles Interdepartmental Operational Requirements Group (GMIORG), a military and civilian committee tasked with the coordination of research on guided missiles, as well as the development of tactics and overall strategy. In his role as USAF Deputy Chief of Staff for Development, Saville helped direct missile work, but soon replaced himself on the GMIORG with Major General Robert M. Lee, commander of TAC. Saville was more interested in air-to-air guided missiles than in ground-based ballistic missiles, which became the focus of the committee.

Saville and Fairchild went to Congress in 1950, and obtained $114 million for the development of an electronic computer-based air defense system, a project headed by George E. Valley Jr., who was a physicist at Massachusetts Institute of Technology (MIT). The computer, named Whirlwind, helped the USAF develop the Semi Automatic Ground Environment (SAGE) air defense system.

In March 1950, Fairchild died. Fairchild had been Saville's champion in the USAF, and Saville had used Fairchild's influence as a shield to "get things done", according to Smart. In the process, Saville had made enough enemies in the Air Staff that he realized Fairchild's absence would greatly limit his career advancement. He began planning his retirement, finishing ongoing projects, and first selecting then grooming his replacement: Brigadier General Laurence C. Craigie. In June 1950, Saville gave a lecture on air defense at the Air War College, Maxwell AFB, Alabama, telling the students that the optimal air defense system as he envisaged might be able to destroy 60% of an attacking bomber force, but that realistic results would be closer to 30% reduction. He emphasized the need for better intelligence regarding Soviet offensive airpower capabilities, to increase the accuracy of air defense predictions.

In late 1950, USAF Chief Scientist Louis Ridenour initiated Project Charles at MIT to study problems of air defense. The study determined that Valley's methods were the best option. In May 1951, the project was reformed as Project Lincoln to investigate unusual reconnaissance methods; this group met at Beacon Hill, Boston, and became known as the Beacon Hill Study Group. Saville expanded the group by naming 15 men to the project, all experts in their fields, including Edwin H. Land, James Gilbert Baker, Edward Mills Purcell, Richard Scott Perkin and USAF Colonel Richard S. Leghorn. The project led to the establishment of Lincoln Laboratory, a research and development project of the Defense Department.

== Civilian career ==
In the Army, Navy, Air Force Journal, Saville announced the engagement of his daughter Ina Gordon Saville to James R. Pitts, a cadet at West Point. Ina graduated from the College of William and Mary in 1951, with a degree in English, then married Pitts on June 17. In July 1951, Saville retired from the USAF.

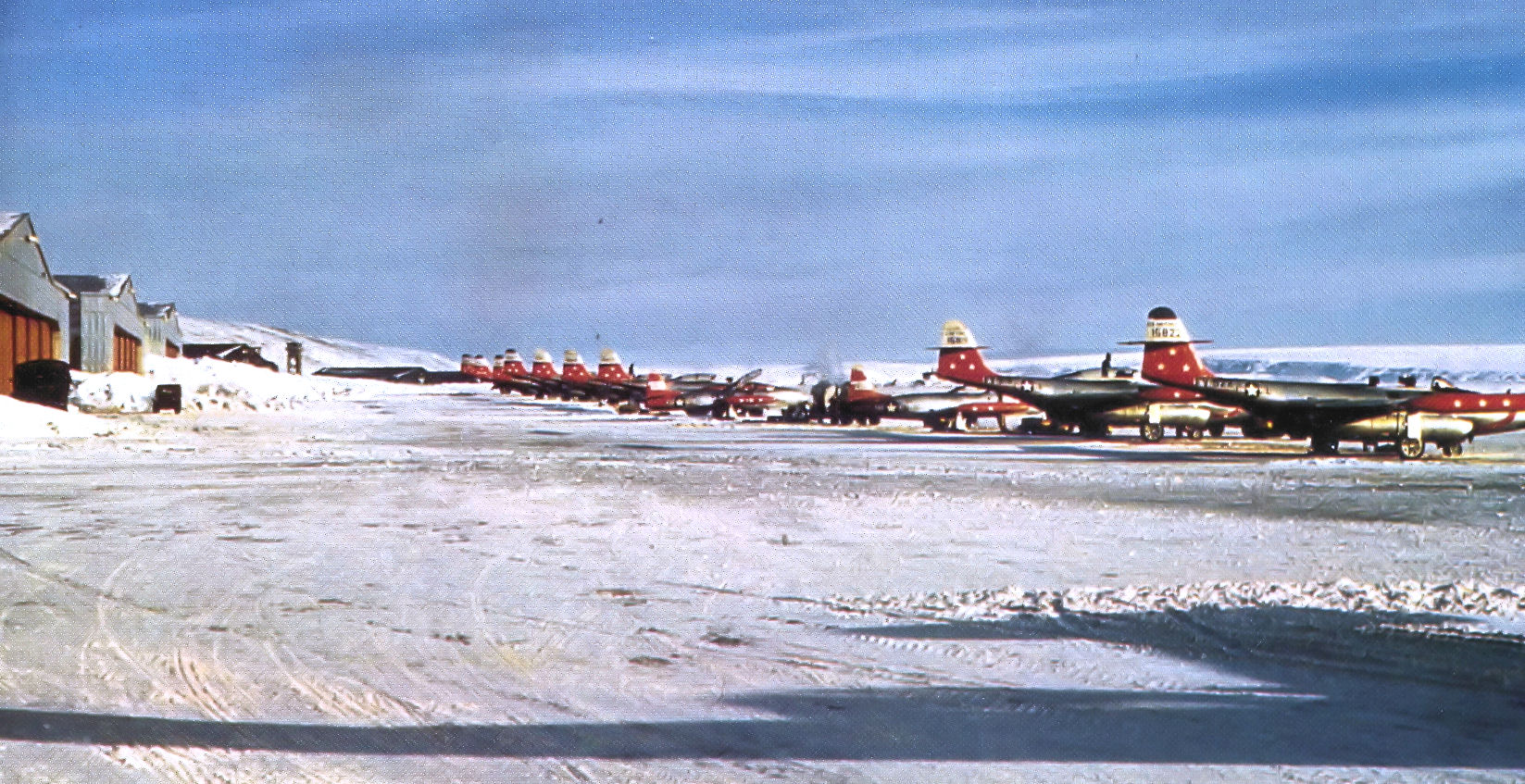
Thule Air Force Base was one of the larger bases Saville approved to increase America's air defenses.

Saville was invited to join a November 1952 experimental commercial flight from Los Angeles to Copenhagen, flying to Denmark in a Scandinavian Airlines System (SAS) DC-6B named Arild Viking, stopping first in Edmonton, Canada, then at the newly operational Thule Air Force Base in Greenland, which Saville had previously approved for major construction. The 28-hour, 5,940-mile (9,560 km) flight plan pioneered a polar route for SAS. Saville accompanied Colonel Bernt Balchen, the Norwegian-born commander of Thule AFB.

In 1953, Saville wrote a feature for Air Force Magazine, describing a strong air defense as one of the essential elements for preventing wars. He said "only a fool would run into a hornet's nest of opposition." However, he emphasized that a perfect air defense could never succeed in preventing an attack by itself, only in blunting it. A powerful counterattack force was required.

In December 1954, Saville celebrated the marriage of his airman son Edward to Lettice Lee von Selzam, a debutante from Wisconsin. Saville's younger son John served as best man. Edward was a lieutenant in the USAF, and among the eight ushers were five other USAF lieutenants.

Saville was hired in November 1954, to work for Ramo-Wooldridge, a company that formed from the FCS team at Hughes. Saville was made Director of Military Requirements, a new position tailored to his unique background. In this liaison role, Saville met regularly with military leaders to ensure that Ramo-Wooldridge projects answered America's defense needs. When Thompson Products merged with Ramo-Woodridge to form TRW, Saville became vice president of the new company. Saville retired in 1963, and became a consultant to TRW and to other government agencies. In the mid-1960s Saville invested in cattle ranches, embarking upon what he called a "third career" as a cattle rancher. He was invited to participate in a panel discussion at the annual Conference on World Affairs in 1966.

== Death and legacy ==
Saville died on January 31, 1984, and was interred at Arlington National Cemetery.

In his career, Saville was awarded the Distinguished Service Medal with oak leaf cluster, the Legion of Merit, the Distinguished Flying Cross, the Bronze Star Medal and the Air Medal. He was rated a Command Pilot, Combat Observer, Aircraft Observer and Technical Observer.

Saville's daughter Ina bore four daughters in the 1950s, and died in 2005. Saville's son Edward produced two sons and a daughter. He retired from the USAF at the rank of lieutenant colonel and lives in Beaufort, South Carolina; his wife "Letty" died in 2000.
