= Republic XF-91 Thunderceptor =

Experimental interceptor aircraft

XF-91 Thunderceptor
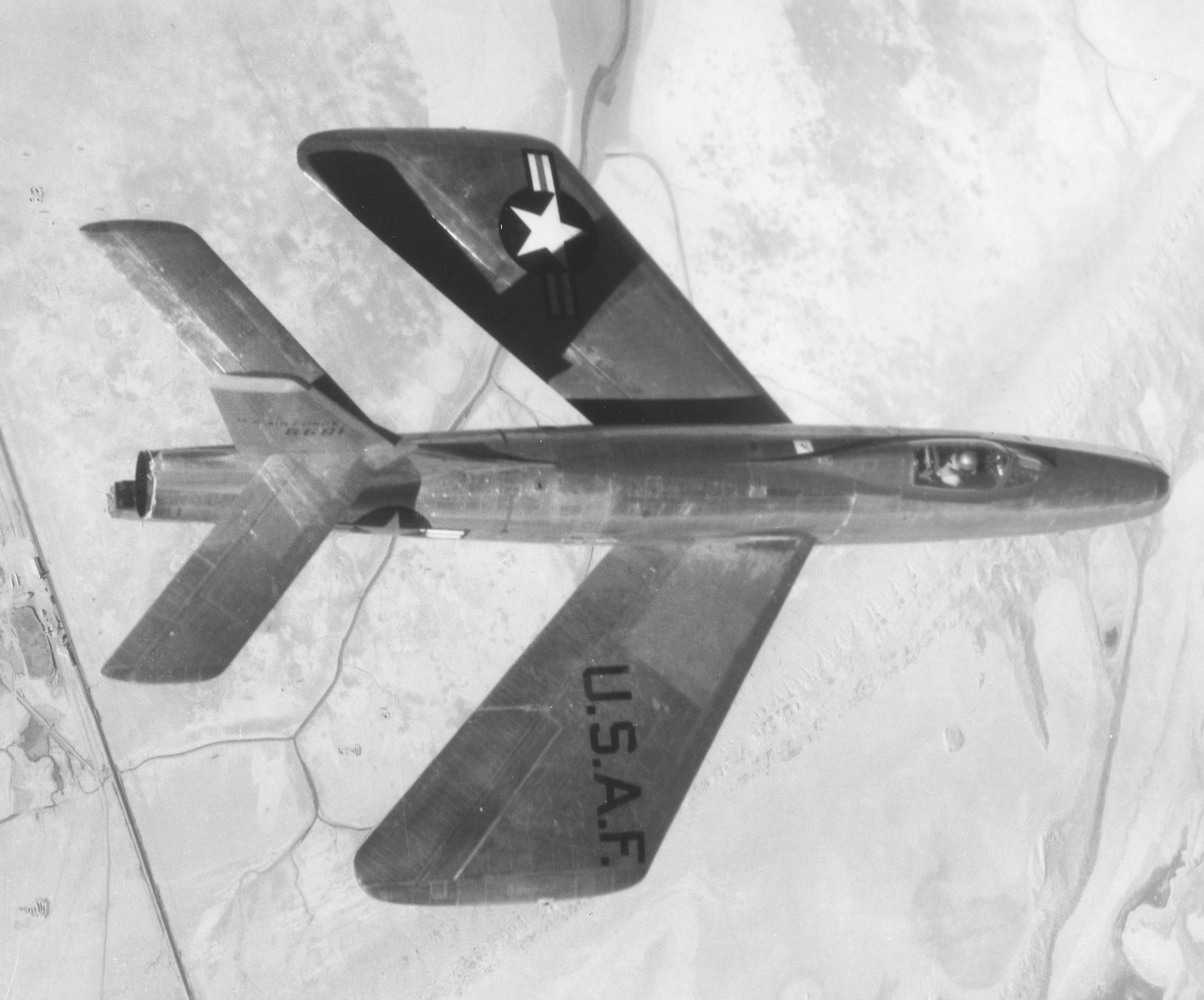

General information
- Type: Prototype interceptor aircraft
- Manufacturer: Republic Aviation
- Status: Canceled
- Number built: 2

History
- First flight: May 9, 1949
- Developed from: Republic F-84 Thunderjet

The Republic XF-91 Thunderceptor (originally designated XP-91) is a mixed-propulsion prototype interceptor aircraft, developed by Republic Aviation. The aircraft would use a jet engine for most flight, and a cluster of four small rocket engines for added thrust during climb and interception. The design was largely obsolete by the time it was completed due to the rapidly increasing performance of contemporary jet engines, and only two prototypes were built. One of these was the first American fighter to exceed Mach 1 in level flight.

A unique feature of the Thunderceptor was its unusual inverse tapered wing, in which the chord length increased along the wing span from the root to the tip, the opposite of conventional swept wing designs. This was an attempt to address the problem of pitch-up, a potentially deadly phenomenon that plagued early high-speed models. The Thunderceptor's design meant the entire wing stalled smoothly, more like a straight-wing design.

== Design and development ==
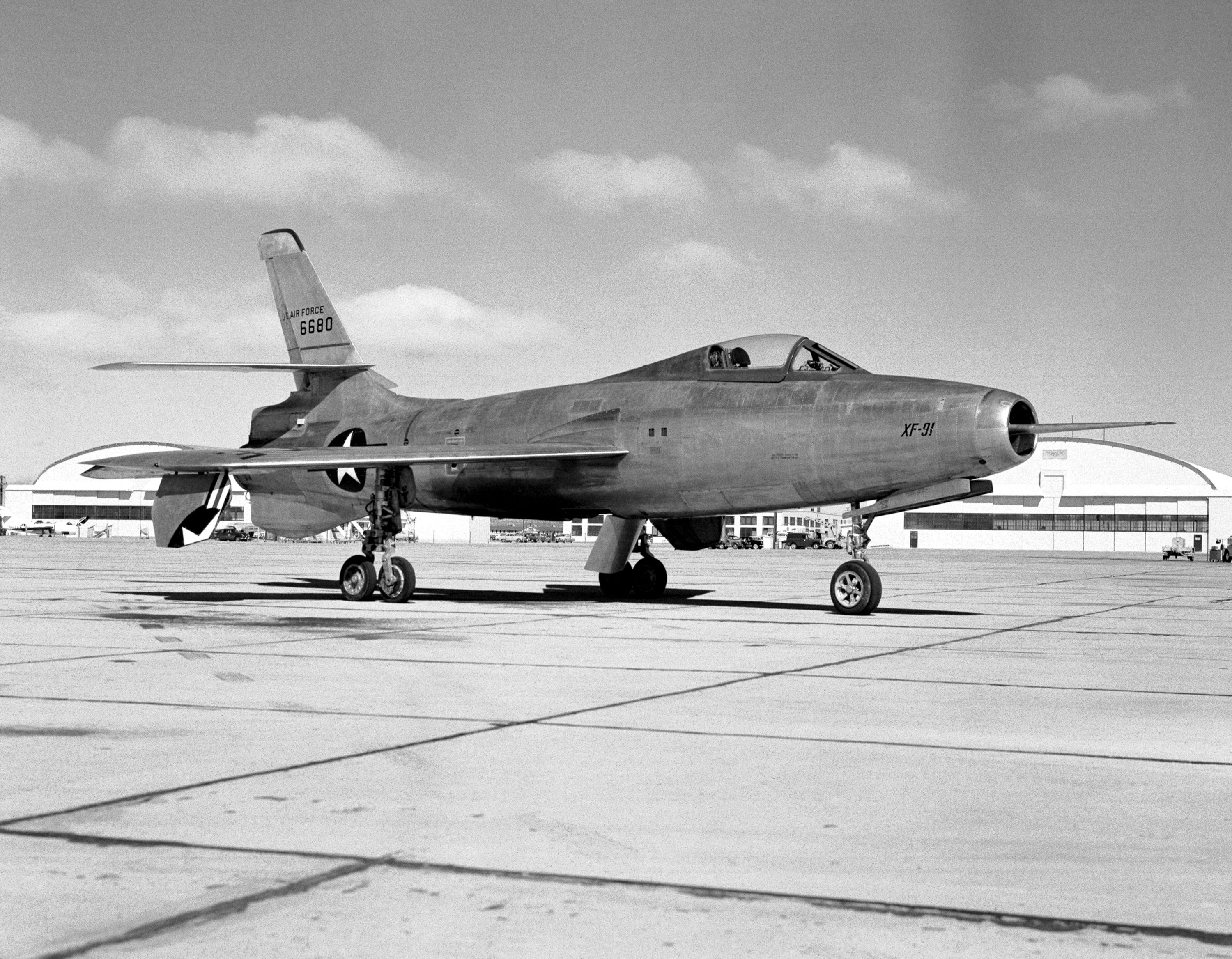
XF-91 in 1951 at Edwards Air Force Base.

During the development of the XP-84, Republic, under the guidance of Alexander Kartveli, looked at the installation of rockets to fighters. The company was inspired by German wartime aircraft: the rocket-powered Messerschmitt Me 163 and the experimental rocket-boosted turbojet Messerschmitt Me 262C Heimatschützer (home protector) series of interceptor prototypes.

The Thunderceptor design was one of two swept-wing modifications based on the original Republic F-84 Thunderjet, the other being the Republic F-84F Thunderstreak which was developed later. A serious problem with most swept wing designs of the era was dangerous performance at low speeds and high angle of attack. The stagnant airflow over the wing tended to "slide" towards the wingtips, which caused them to stall before the rest of the wing. In this situation the center of lift would rapidly shift forward relative to the center of mass, pitching the nose up and leading to an even greater angle of attack or, in extreme cases, end-over-end tumbling of the aircraft. Aircraft caught in this regime would often stall and crash, and a rash of such accidents with the North American F-100 Super Sabre led to the term "Sabre dance". (Note: The most famous incident was the loss of an F-100C Super Sabre during an attempted emergency landing at Edwards AFB, California on 10 January 1956 which was caught by film cameras set up for an unrelated test. The pilot fought to retain control as he rode the knife-edge of the flight envelope but fell off on one wing, hit the ground, and exploded with fatal results.)

The Thunderceptor's most notable design feature was intended to address this problem. The wings were built to have considerably more chord (distance from the leading edge to the trailing edge) at the tip than root, allowing them to generate more lift. This neatly addressed the problem of Sabre dance by delaying the point of stall on the tip to that of the entire wing. A side-effect of this design was that the tips had more internal room, so the landing gear was mounted to retract outwards with the wheels lying in the wingtips, using two smaller wheels in a tandem arrangement for each main gear strut, instead of one larger one. Another design change was the ability to vary the angle of incidence of the wing as a whole, tilting it up for low speed operations during takeoff and landing, and then "leveling it off" for high-speed flight and cruise. This allowed the fuselage to remain closer to level while landing, greatly improving visibility.

In keeping with its intended role as an interceptor, the nose was redesigned to incorporate a radar antenna, forcing the air intake for the engine to be moved from its original nose-mounted position to a new intake below it. The fuselage was otherwise very similar to the F-84's. The first prototype did not include the radome, although this was fitted to the second prototype.

== Testing and evaluation ==
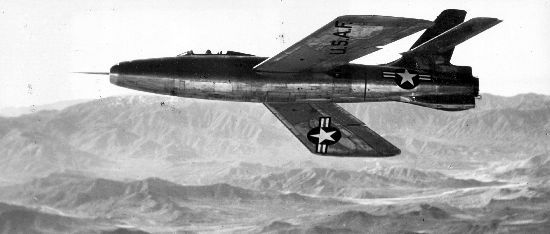
XF-91 Thunderceptor during testing

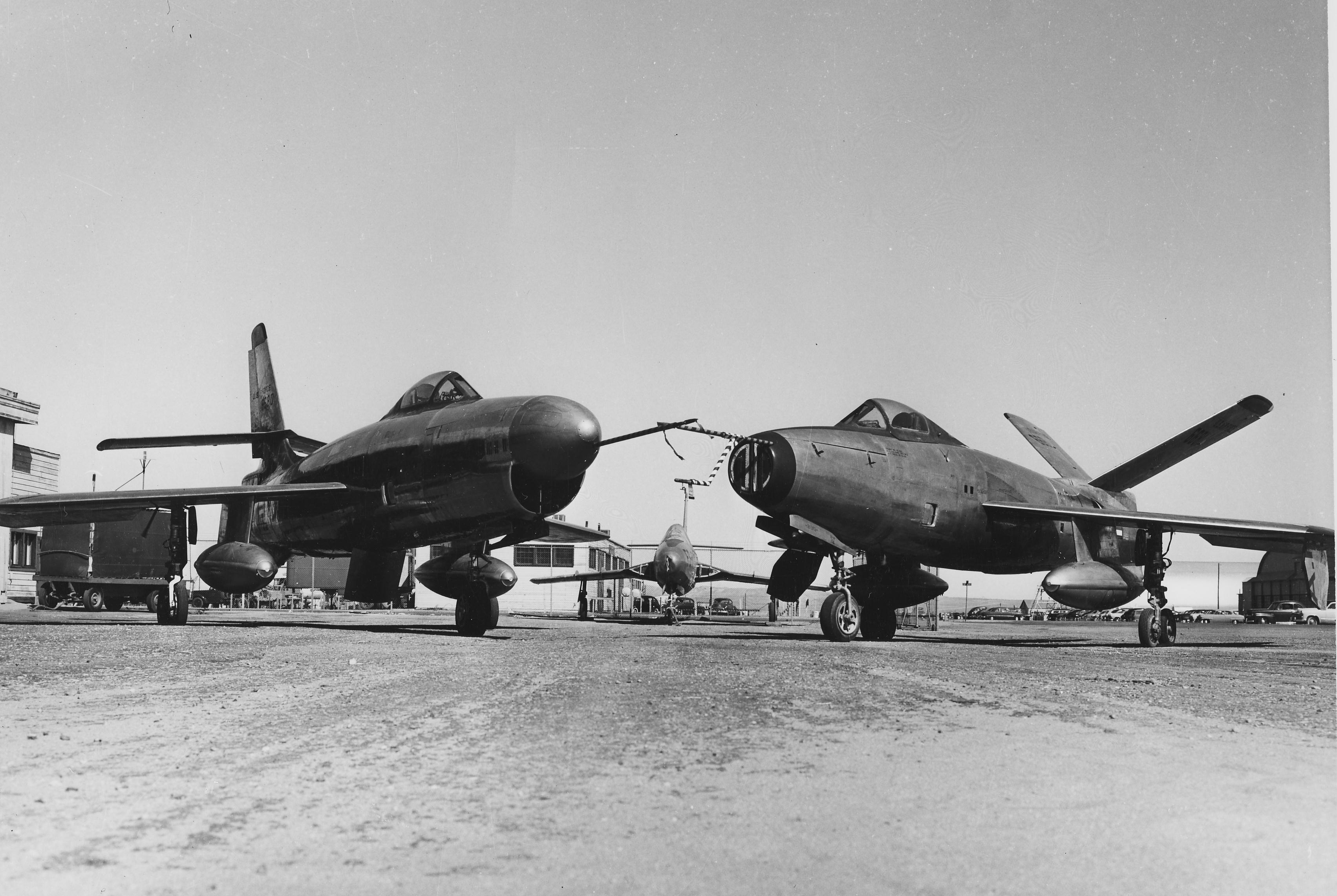
On the left is Republic XF-91 (serial number 46-680) after the nose radome installation and on the right is XF-91 (serial 46-681) after the V-tail modification.

The first prototype made its first flight on 9 May 1949, breaking the speed of sound in December 1951. It was later modified with a small radome for gunnery ranging (although not the "full" radome of the second prototype). The second prototype included a full radome and chin-mounted intake, but was otherwise similar. With both the jet and rockets running, the aircraft could reach Mach 1.71. Both prototypes completed 192 test flights over the course of five years.

The second prototype, 46-681, had an engine failure during takeoff from Edwards AFB in the summer of 1951. Republic test pilot Carl Bellinger escaped from the aircraft just as the tail melted off only 90 seconds into the flight. By the time fire apparatus arrived, driving seven miles (11 km) across the dry lake bed, the tail section had been reduced to ashes. 46-681 was then fitted with a "V" (or "butterfly") tail, and was flight-tested with this configuration. It was later used at Edwards AFB as a crash-crew training simulator, then scrapped.

As an interceptor the Thunderceptor was soon eclipsed by designs from other companies, but like the Thunderceptor none of these would go into production. The United States Air Force decided to wait the short time needed to introduce newer and much more capable designs created as a part of the 1954 interceptor project. The Thunderceptor, like the other interceptor designs of the era, had extremely short flight times on the order of 25 minutes, making them almost useless for protecting an area as large as the United States. The 1954 designs outperformed the XF-91 in speed, range, and loiter time, as well as including the radar and fire-control systems needed for night and all-weather operation. The era of the dedicated day fighter-type interceptor was over.

== Aircraft on display ==
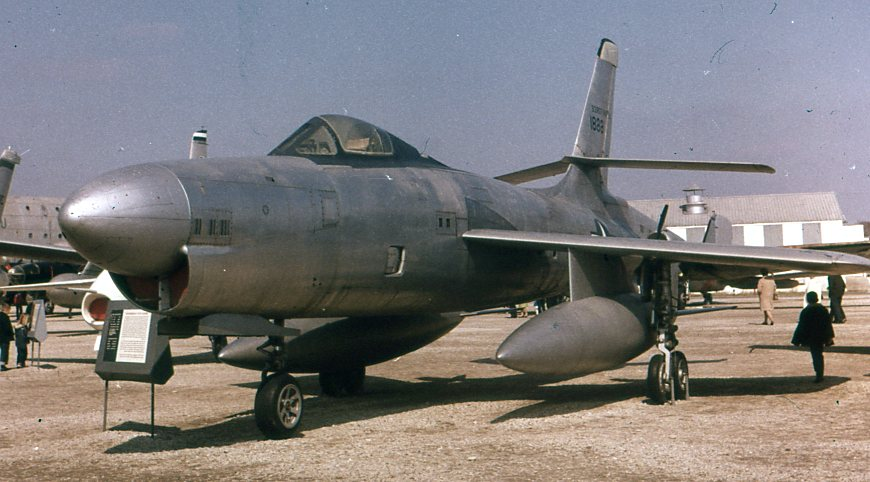
XF-91 Thunderceptor, s/n 46-680 on display

The surviving prototype, 46–0680, is exhibited in the Research & Development Gallery at the National Museum of the United States Air Force at Wright-Patterson AFB in Dayton, Ohio.

== Specifications (XF-91 Thunderceptor) ==

Data from The Complete Book of Fighters, Air Force Legends #210 : Republic XF-91 Thunderceptor

General characteristics

- Crew: 1
- Length: 43 ft 3 in (13.18 m)

47 ft 6 in (14 m) with butterfly tail
46 ft 9 in (14 m) with radome nose

- Wingspan: 31 ft 2.7 in (9.517 m)
- Height: 18 ft 1.1875 in (5.516563 m)

16 ft 6 in (5 m) with butterfly tail

- Wing area: 320 sq ft (30 m^{2})
- Airfoil: Republic R-4,40-1710-1.0
- Empty weight: 15,853 lb (7,191 kg)
- Gross weight: 18,600 lb (8,437 kg)
- Max takeoff weight: 28,516 lb (12,935 kg)
- Fuel capacity: 46-680 559 US gal (465 imp gal; 2,120 L) internals (JP)

46-681 231 US gal (192 imp gal; 870 L) JP in fuselage tank

50 US gal (42 imp gal; 190 L) LOX in forward fuselage
87 US gal (72 imp gal; 330 L) LOX in rear fuselage
191 US gal (159 imp gal; 720 L) water-alcohol in forward fuselage
- 2x drop tanks

60 US gal (50 imp gal; 230 L) (JP), 216 US gal (180 imp gal; 820 L) LOX, 265 US gal (221 imp gal; 1,000 L) water-alcohol in each

- Powerplant: 1 × General Electric J47-GE-7 (later GE-17) turbojet engine, 5,200 lbf (23 kN) thrust dry

6,100 lbf (27 kN) with water injection dry, 6,900 lbf (31 kN) with afterburner

- Powerplant: 1 × Reaction Motors XLR11-RM-9 four-combustion chamber liquid-fuelled rocket engine, 6,000 lbf (27 kN) thrust with chambers individually switchable

- Fuel: Water-alcohol (25% H_{2}O / 75% C_{2}H_{6}O)
- Oxidiser: Liquid Oxygen (LOX)

Performance

- Maximum speed: 984 mph (1,584 km/h, 855 kn) at 47,500 ft (14,478 m)
- Maximum speed: Mach 1.49
- Range: 1,171 mi (1,885 km, 1,018 nmi)
- Service ceiling: 50,000–55,000 ft (15,000–17,000 m)
- Time to altitude: 50,000 ft (15,240 m) in 5 minutes 30 seconds
- Wing loading: 58.12 lb/sq ft (283.8 kg/m^{2})
- Thrust/weight: 0.60

Armament

- Guns: provision for:

- 4 × 20 mm (0.787 in) M3 cannons with 200 rpg (F-91)

or

- 4 × T-110 cannons with 15 T-131 rounds each (F-91-1)

or

- 4 × 20 mm (0.787 in) M24 cannons with 200 rpg (F-91-3)

- Rockets:

- up to 6 × 5 in (127 mm) HVAR (F-91B)

or

- 48 × 2.75 in (70 mm) Mighty Mouse rockets in extendable launcher clusters

- Missiles: 4 × Hughes AIM-4 Falcon air-air missiles (F-91-2)

== See also ==
Aircraft of comparable role, configuration, and era

- Avro 720
- Saunders-Roe SR.53
- Saunders-Roe SR.177

Related lists

- List of military aircraft of the United States
- List of fighter aircraft
