= WS-201 =

US Air Force interceptor aircraft development program

WS-201A, informally known as the 1954 Interceptor, was a United States Air Force project to develop a dedicated interceptor aircraft that would enter service in 1954. Several aircraft were developed as part of the project, leading to the F-102 Delta Dagger, F-106 Delta Dart, Republic XF-103 and, indirectly, the F-101B Voodoo and F-104 Starfighter. The electronics and weapons developed for the program would become common on US designs, including the AIM-4 Falcon missile and a variety of Hughes Aircraft–supplied radar and fire control systems. The project also led, eventually, to the upgrading of the SAGE battle control computers to directly control the interceptors for much of their flight. Although greatly delayed, the resulting systems operated for approximately 20 years, into the 1980s.

== Background ==
The "1954 interceptor" concept first appeared shortly after the creation of the Air Force from the former US Army Air Force in the post-World War II era. With the re-arrangement of command, several new organizations within the Air Force were created, including Tactical Air Command (TAC) and Air Defense Command (ADC), who shared an interest in fighter aircraft. TAC was primarily tasked with offensive duties, but required capable fighters to protect their offensive capability. ADC was tasked solely with the defense of the US from enemy attack, in particular long-range bombers. Soon after their formation, TAC and ADC started moving away from each other in their requirements.

In early 1949 ADC started a Request for Proposals (RFP) for an advanced interceptor capable of attacking Soviet bombers that were expected to enter service in the early 1950s. Several jet-powered interceptors were already under development at that point, typically adaptations of existing fighters like the F-86 Sabre (the F-86D Sabre Dog), the F-94 Starfire (adapted from the P-80 Shooting Star), with the exception being the all-new F-89 Scorpion. These were all subsonic aircraft, and it was felt they would have insufficient performance to effectively intercept high-speed jet bombers known to be under development in the Soviet Union.

To counter these threats, ADC prepared a request for an entirely new aircraft expected to perform "hot war" interceptions at supersonic speeds. For reasons that are not clear, they also demanded that the entire system be flown and operated by a single pilot. Given the complexity of the radar systems and the aircraft themselves, this would require an advanced autopilot system that was integrated with the fire control system to reduce pilot workload. Given the perceived threat, the new designs were expected to enter service in 1954.

== WS-201A ==
The Air Force realized that the complexity of these newer systems would make integration difficult. In the past, aircraft airframes, engines and weapons were fairly common in size and general layout, allowing existing designs to be modified to change any one component with relative ease. For the 1954 interceptor, new equipment such as missiles and radar systems would be radically different between designs. There was little expectation that one missile could be swapped for another, for instance, due to different electronic requirements as well as different mechanical layout.

To deal with this problem the Air Force introduced the "Weapons Systems" concept, where an entire aircraft (or other system) would be ordered as a complete working assembly. Although the parts going into it would be ordered under separate contracts, the requirements of the system as a whole would be known to all of the participants in advance, and one of the companies would be considered "prime" on ensuring all the parts would fit when they were delivered. The 1954 interceptor was the first fighter aircraft ordered under the Weapon System concept, and became "WS-201A". Contracts for the various parts making up 201A were sent out as soon as they completed documenting them, starting with the electronics suite, then the missile, and finally airframe and engine.

Studies of the electronics suite had started in February 1949, prior to the 201A specification, and were folded into the project. In January 1950 they sent out the MX-1179 contract tender to eighteen electronics contractors, but only Bendix, General Electric, Hughes Aircraft, North American Aviation, Sperry, and Westinghouse responded. Hughes was announced as the winner in July 1950, with what would become the MA-1. The original contract specified that MX-1179 would "direct some type of air-to-air guided missile." Hughes had already won the MX-904 contract for the missile GAR-1 Falcon. This was selected for 201A mainly because it seemed to be the only one that could meet the 1954 operational date.

The airframe and engine contract was issued as MX-1554 on 18 June 1950, with a January 1951 deadline for submissions. MX-1554 also stated that the winner of the airframe contract would also be named the lead "integrator" of the overall Weapon System. When the deadline was reached, nine different proposals were submitted; Republic Aircraft entered three designs, North American two, and Chance-Vought, Convair, Douglas, and Lockheed each submitted a single design. On 2 July 1951 the Air Force announced that Convair, Lockheed, and Republic had been selected to continue development through the mockup stage, and a winner would be selected at that point.

Shortly after, the Air Force decided that it also needed a day fighter to combat the new MiG-15s that were being encountered over Korea. Existing designs like the P-80 Shooting Star and F-84 Thunderjet were outperformed by the MiG, and while the newer F-86 Sabre was more than capable of holding its own, it was not clear that would be the case in a war situation in Europe against "front line" Soviet pilots. A plane of considerably greater performance was needed to guarantee leadership in this role, so the Lockheed entry was redirected toward a day fighter role, evolving into the F-104 Starfighter. Convair and Republic continued on with the original MX-1554.

It became clear that the Republic design was far too advanced for the 1954 operational deadline, and on 11 September 1951 the Convair design was selected as the MX-1554 airframe and was designated F-102. Republic was to continue development of their more powerful design at a lower priority, becoming the F-103. With the introduction of these programs, work on the Republic XF-91A, originally slated as an interim interceptor, ended in October 1951 in favor of the new designs.

Although the F-102 had been selected as the "low tech" solution to meet the 1954 deadline, practically every part of the 201A system encountered delays. It was clear that the engine, a Wright-modified version of the Bristol Olympus known as the J67, would not be ready for a 1954 service entry. Additionally, the MX-1179 fire-control system seemed to be a risky proposition, and was a source of delay. In December the Air Force decided to reduce the risk by splitting the program in two, producing a reduced-performance version with interim engines and fire control as an "Interim Interceptor", and continuing with the original design over a longer period as the "Ultimate Interceptor". The Interim design would use the Westinghouse J40 engine, already available (although low power), and the Hughes E-9 fire-control system, a slightly updated version of the system being used in the F-86D.

Meanwhile, practically every part of the F-103 program was going wrong. Construction of the airframe required extensive use of titanium to endure the high heat load of extended Mach 3+ operation. This proved more difficult to fabricate than expected. The engine, a combination of a Wright-modified version of the Bristol Olympus and a "combined cycle" ramjet from Marquardt, also encountered extensive problems and the J67 eventually ended in failure. Nevertheless, the expected performance was so high that the program was allowed to continue.

== Interim measures ==
The delays seriously upset the original timetable, and it was clear by 1952 that even the "low tech" F-102 would not be able to meet the 1954 deadline. Although it was expected that the F-102B would be an excellent long-term solution, something was needed quickly to fill the performance gap between the existing subsonic designs and the continuing delays in the existing F-102 design. ADC argued that having a second design would also guarantee that problems in either program would be less likely to effect defense as a whole.

The only design with the needed performance at that time was the McDonnell F-88. This design had originally been ordered by Strategic Air Command (SAC) as a long-range "penetration fighter" to escort their heavy bombers. When newer bomber designs offered performance so great that the F-88 could not hope to keep up with them, TAC then took over the work and started modifying it as a low-level nuclear-armed fighter-bomber, renaming it as the F-101 Voodoo on 26 November 1951.

ADC also became interested in the Voodoo in October 1952, but funding from higher headquarters was difficult to obtain. They rejected modifying the F-101, mainly due to its high cost, and suggested solving the problem by increasing the numbers of F-86Ds and speeding up work on the F-102. In April ADC once again asked for the F-101, this time justifying it as a longer-range counterpart for use in areas not widely covered by radar. It appears this suggestion was also rejected.

In August 1953 the Soviets detonated their first hydrogen bomb, and ADC's concerns became more urgent. The Air Force Council issued proposals to industry for a new design to work alongside the F-102 that would help fill the gap between the F-89 and F-106. After short consideration of alternatives—an updated F-89 and an interceptor version of F-100—the two-seat modification of F-101 was finally selected for development. Known as F-101B, it would be equipped with the MG-3/Falcon suite from the F-102, but operated by a weapons officer instead of the pilot. It would greatly simplify the complexity of the system as a whole.

== Continued problems ==
Work on the airframes continued through 1952 and into 1953. NACA wind tunnel tests in early 1953 showed that the maximum altitude of 57,000 feet and combat radius of 350 miles predicted by Convair were too optimistic. Drag turned out to be higher than expected, but NACA was able to suggest the application of the recently developed area rule to combat this problem. Convair did not immediately put these recommendations into effect, and the initial two flying prototypes, of an order of 42 aircraft, continued with the original design. When these flew starting in October 1953, NACA's estimates were proven correct, and the F-102 had only a marginal performance improvement over the F-86D it was supposed to replace.

== See also ==
- Operational Requirement F.155—British interceptor program of 1955
