= Benjamin S. Kelsey =

United States Air Force general (1906–1981)

Ben Kelsey
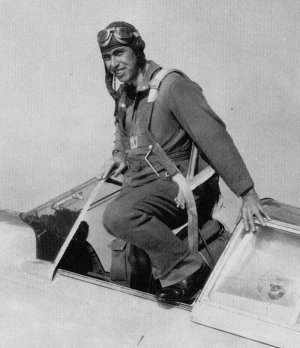
- Ben Kelsey exits a Curtiss P-36A after a flight test in early 1938 at Wright Field.
- Born: March 9, 1906; Waterbury, Connecticut, U.S.
- Died: March 3, 1981 (aged 74); Stevensburg, Virginia, U.S.
- Military career
- Allegiance: United States
- Branch: US Army Air Corps; US Army Air Forces; United States Air Force
- Service years: 1929–1955
- Rank: Brigadier General (temporary)
- Nickname: "Ben"
- Awards: Distinguished Service Medal; Distinguished Flying Cross; Legion of Merit; Air Medal; French Croix de Guerre; Belgian Croix de guerre Octave Chanute Award

Benjamin Scovill Kelsey (March 9, 1906 – March 3, 1981) was an American aeronautical engineer and test pilot. Serving as America's chief fighter projects officer, he helped bring success in World War II to the United States Army Air Forces by initiating the manufacture of innovative fighter aircraft designs, and by working to quickly increase American fighter production to meet the needs of the coming war.

Kelsey co-authored the technical specifications which led to the development of the P-39 Airacobra and the P-38 Lightning. He worked around Air Corps strictures to initiate the development of drop tanks for American fighters. Kelsey was the driving force behind a program of advanced airfoil research which eventually resulted in the P-51 Mustang.

After the war, Kelsey served in various staff assignments supervising weather operations, personnel and materiel. He was an important committee member of the group that approved and funded the rocket-powered North American X-15.

== Early career ==
Benjamin S. Kelsey was born in Waterbury, Connecticut, in 1906, and was raised there. At the age of 15 he completed a flying course with the Curtiss Flying Service at Garden City, New York. He graduated from Massachusetts Institute of Technology (MIT) with a Bachelor of Science degree in mechanical engineering in June 1928, and stayed to teach and conduct research work in the aeronautics department. With fellow aeronautical engineering student Everard M. Lester, Kelsey wrote "A Study in Cams as Applied to the Main Driving Member in Reciprocating Engines".

Kelsey flew extensively for commercial concerns as well as privately, and obtained a transport pilot license. He joined the United States Army Air Corps and was commissioned a second lieutenant on May 2, 1929. At Mitchel Field, he worked with the Guggenheim Fog Flying Laboratory. As stipulated by Harry Guggenheim, Kelsey flew as Lieutenant Jimmy Doolittle's safety pilot during the first fully 'blind' instrument flight on September 24, 1929, showing observers that he was not in control by keeping his hands visible outside the cockpit. The following year he graduated from Primary and Advanced Flying Schools, and in 1931 he obtained his Master of Science degree in aeronautical engineering at MIT. Assigned with the 20th Pursuit Group at Mather Field and later at Barksdale Field, he served in various tactical unit duties.

== Fighter development ==
In 1934, Kelsey was transferred to Materiel Command at Wright Field near Dayton, Ohio, and served as fighter project officer in the Engineering Section. In this role he was the only person responsible for Air Corps fighter development, and was kept busy with inquiries and proposals from aircraft manufacturers. Kelsey continued to research blind landing techniques and develop instrument flying practices and hardware. On October 1, 1934, he was promoted to first lieutenant.

=== Allison V-1710 ===
Kelsey stayed current with efforts by Allison Engine Company to create a liquid-cooled engine suitable for fighters—such engines were seen as offering the possibility of greater speed and higher altitude than air-cooled engines. In late 1936 to early 1937, Kelsey flight-tested the 12-cylinder Allison V-1710-C6 as installed in the experimental Consolidated XA-11A, reaching an altitude of 26,400 ft without turbo-supercharging. The V-1710 passed difficult Air Corps endurance and reliability tests, and demonstrated a smooth, predictable power curve. Kelsey would subsequently base important fighter specifications on engines of this series.

As Project Officer for Fighters, Kelsey tested a great number of aircraft models, possibly flying more new types of US fighters than any other pilot. He was first to fly the Bell twin-Allison XFM-1 Airacuda prototype on September 1, 1937.

=== P-39 Airacobra ===
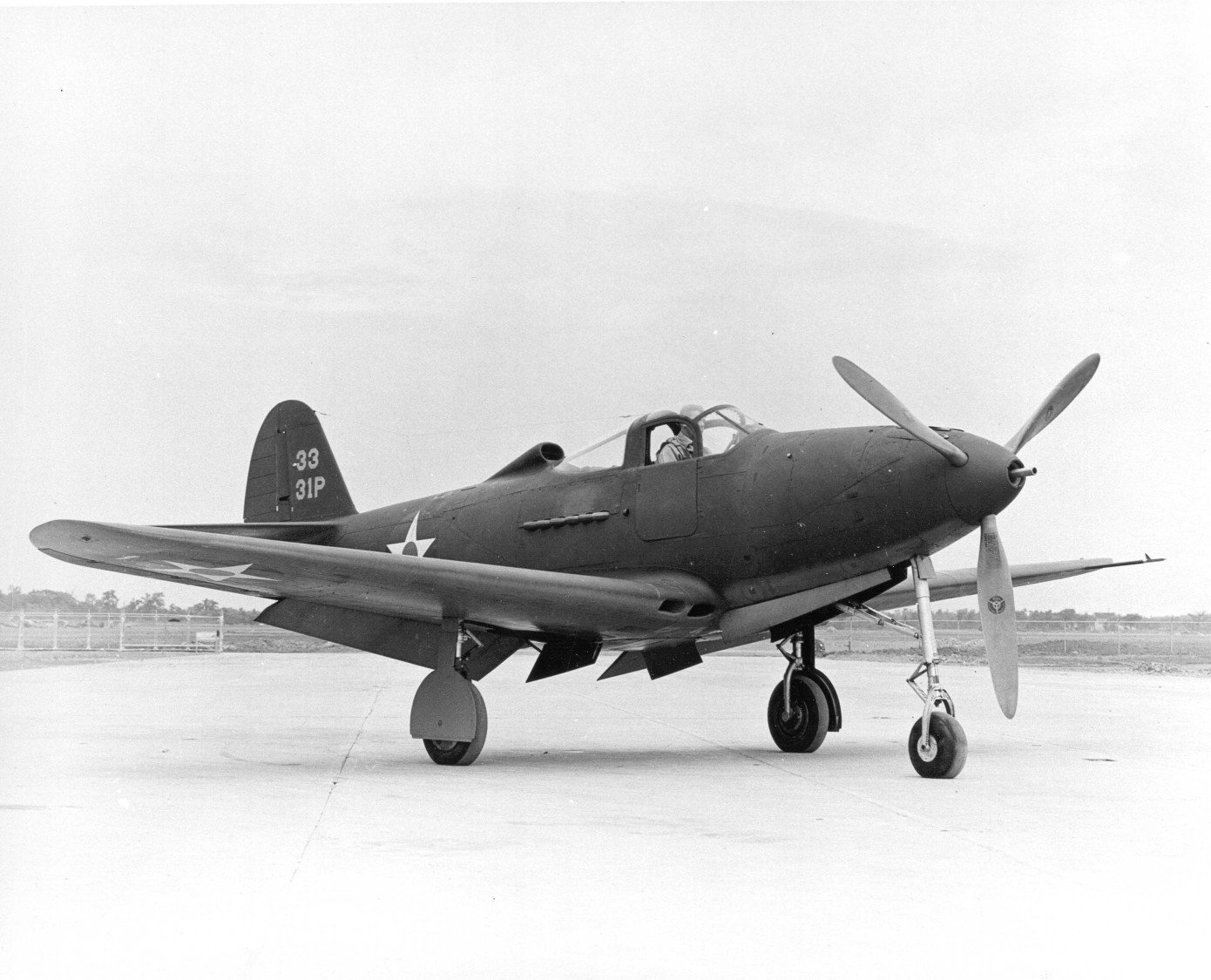
A P-39C Airacobra at Selfridge Field

Kelsey became frustrated by inflexible Air Corps restrictions on pursuit (fighter) aircraft which limited the weight of all guns and ammunition to 500 lbs. He wished for at least 1,000 pounds (450 kg) of armament so that American fighters could dominate their battles. With Lieutenant Gordon P. Saville, Kelsey formulated two new high-altitude fighter specifications in February 1937; one for a single-engine fighter and one for a twin-engine fighter. In Circular Proposal X-608 and X-609, the two men employed the word "interceptor" which had not yet been applied to American military aircraft specifications. In this way, they bypassed the Air Corps limitations. Despite the new term, the proposed aircraft were not fundamentally different in role than traditional pursuit aircraft—just heavier and more powerful. Kelsey specified Allison V-1710 engines with General Electric turbo-superchargers and tricycle landing gear in both proposals, aiming for 360-mile-per-hour (580 km/h) performance, long range, the ability to climb to 20,000 feet (6,100 m) in six minutes, and very heavy armament including a cannon.

Bell Aircraft won the single-engine X-609 contract with their design of the P-39 Airacobra. After the prototype flew, Kelsey was called to England, and handed oversight of the project off to colleagues who, in keeping with advice from the National Advisory Committee for Aeronautics (NACA), ordered the removal of turbo-superchargers from the aircraft. The P-39 was from that point forward unable to compete in the European Theater against high-altitude German fighters. In Soviet hands, however, the Airacobra excelled in air-to-air combat at low and medium altitudes, racking up the highest individual pilot scores for any American-made fighter type, higher than any other American fighter aircraft ever made.

=== P-38 Lightning ===
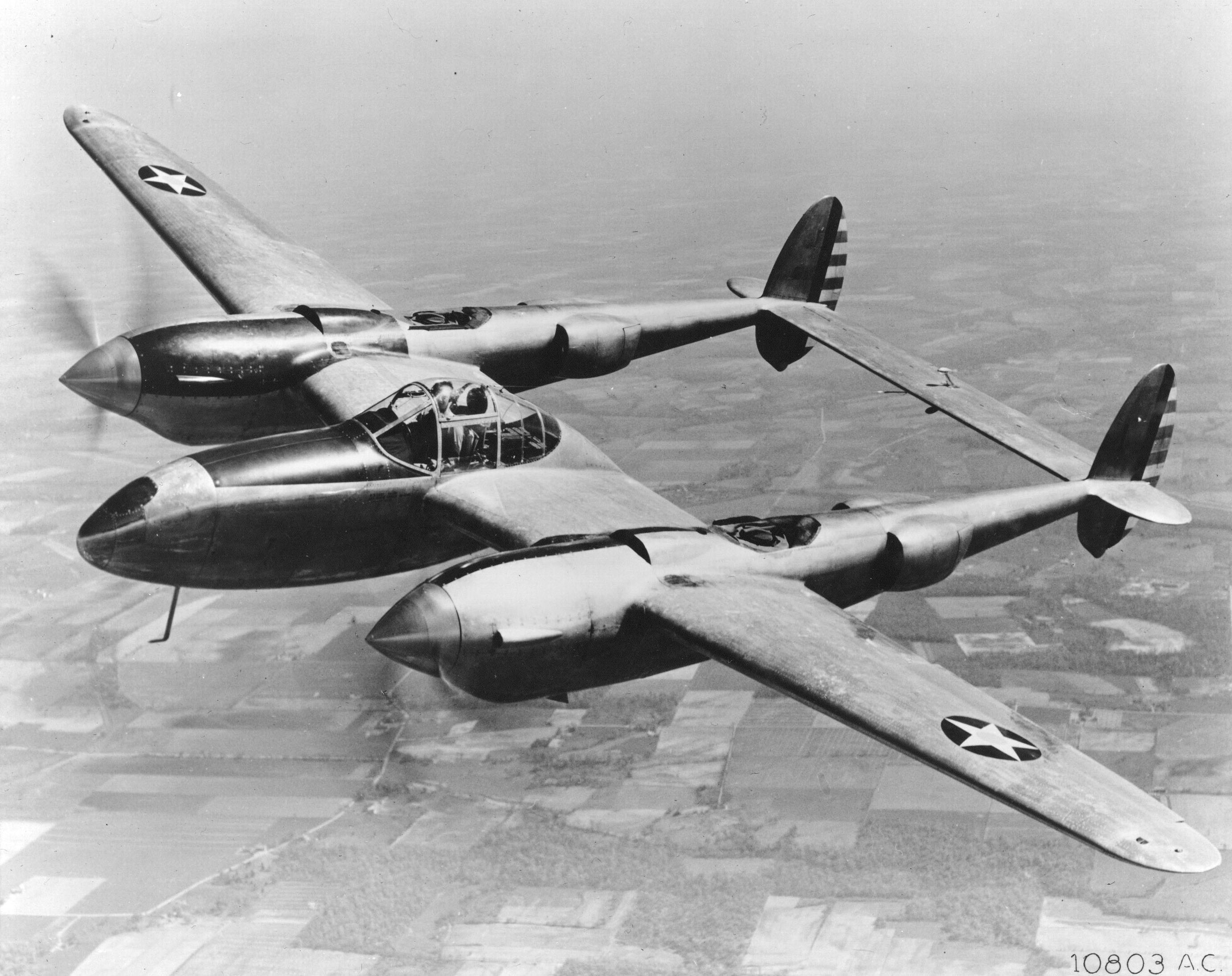
A prototype of the Lockheed P-38 Lightning

Lockheed won the X-608 proposal with their twin-engine Model 22 design, signing a contract with the Air Corps in June 1937. Kelsey flew the first prototype of the P-38 Lightning, the XP-38, on January 27, 1939. After Lockheed performed a series of tests and associated engineering adjustments, Kelsey took the prototype across the country on a record-breaking speed flight in February 1939. Just short of his goal, as he was directed into the landing pattern at Mitchel Field behind three slow trainer aircraft, his prototype's carburetors iced up and the engines would not respond—they continued to idle and would not increase in power. Without the ability to add power, Kelsey fell short of the runway and belly-landed into a sand trap at a golf course, destroying the plane but suffering only minor scratches himself. General Henry "Hap" Arnold was very happy with the speed demonstration and ordered Kelsey to proceed with further development of the design. In May, Kelsey was promoted to the rank of captain.

The P-38 ended up being the "sweetheart of Kelsey's flying career", according to author Jeff Ethell. Kelsey stayed in close contact with the twin-engine fighter during every phase of its development and implementation. As part of Operation Bolero, the first-ever delivery of fighter aircraft flying under their own power from the US to the UK, Kelsey piloted a P-38 to the UK in late July 1942. After meeting with British airmen and reviewing the newest developments of air combat, Kelsey returned to the US by ship.

On April 9, 1943, Kelsey performed a flight test on a modified P-38G to see if Lockheed's newly developed dive flap could be engaged after terminal velocity was reached in a dive. After climbing to 35,000 ft, Kelsey initiated a dive. At maximum speed, he pulled the lever to engage the new flaps but nothing happened. Pulling harder, the handle came off in his hand. Kelsey applied full rudder and aileron at the same time, and suddenly the aircraft lost one wing and the whole tail, and entered an inverted flat spin. Kelsey bailed out and suffered a broken ankle upon landing. The P-38 crashed upside down into a hillside near Calabasas, California.

=== P-51 Mustang ===
The existence of the P-51 Mustang has been credited to Kelsey's dogged determination to see the project to completion. He formulated the specifications for the Curtiss XP-46 and placed an order for two prototypes in September 1939, hoping that the advanced aircraft would replace the P-40 Warhawk which had not demonstrated above-average fighting qualities. Production of the new design was canceled by General Henry "Hap" Arnold as it was anticipated that a four-month delay in Curtiss fighter deliveries would be incurred by the radical change. Kelsey's boss, Colonel Oliver P. Echols, shopped the design to the Anglo-French Purchasing Commission who were told to find an aircraft manufacturer that wasn't busy with war production. Echols and Kelsey made it understood that the NACA airflow research data collected on the XP-46 would be made available to the new manufacturer. North American Aviation (NAA) expressed interest and was sold the NACA data for $56,000. They produced a new design, the NA-73, which was approved by the British who christened the fighter "Mustang". Echols and Kelsey arranged to get two prototypes out of the British contract, and, on July 7, 1941, even before the prototypes arrived at Wright Field, Kelsey ordered 150 P-51s from NAA. Nine months later Kelsey ordered 500 nearly identical A-36 Apache models that he was able to purchase with funds intended for attack bombers. In this manner Kelsey kept the assembly line busy, so that the factory would be primed to make Mustang fighters once a new contract could be arranged. After the US declared war in December 1941, thousands of military aircraft were ordered, and NAA ramped up for Mustang production.

Once the Mustang was in combat in the European Theater of Operations (ETO), Kelsey was able to collect pilot's opinions of the aircraft as well as going out on combat missions himself to determine whether improvements could be made to the design. Kelsey clarified and expedited the communication of battlefield requests back to the NAA production team such that the turnaround time of modifications was minimized.

=== France and Britain ===
From May to July 1940 Kelsey was sent as assistant military attache for air to Europe to assess the technical progress of German, French and British fighter aircraft. Kelsey traveled to France with Colonel Carl "Tooey" Spaatz, Lieutenant Colonel Frank O'D. "Monk" Hunter and Major George C. Kenney to witness firsthand how France's defenses were insufficient. (Each of these men later attained the rank of general.) Kelsey and the group of American airmen saw that self-sealing fuel tanks were critical in air combat. As well, fighters appeared to require bullet-proof windscreens and better oxygen systems. After passing through Paris, Spaatz and Kelsey flew back to London on May 31. In England, Kelsey determined that the threat posed to Allied convoys by German air and naval power meant that an aerial ferry route should be established over the North Atlantic so that long-range aircraft could be flown to the United Kingdom rather than shipped. Kelsey spent a month touring British airfields, air groups and aircraft manufacturing facilities, receiving excellent cooperation from Royal Air Force (RAF) personnel. While Spaatz and Hunter remained in England, Kelsey helped a group of war refugees travel to the United States, returning himself to Wright Field as chief of the Pursuit Branch in the Production Engineering Section. In March 1941, Kelsey was promoted to major (temporary).

=== Spitfire evaluation ===
In April 1941, the RAF sent two Spitfire Mark VA fighters to Dayton for testing. The variant used a pressurized cockpit for high-altitude pilot comfort—the pilot would not have to wear an oxygen mask. Kelsey ferried one of the aircraft to and from Los Angeles so that it could be examined further at a California facility. Because of the Spitfire's inherent range limitations, Kelsey was forced to make a number of refueling stops at little-used air fields. Kelsey noted engine overheating during taxiing and brake fade on long desert runways in the presence of significant crosswind. He found long cross-country flight very tiring due to the Spitfire's marginal stability (which gave it high maneuverability in combat.) Kelsey felt that the highly lauded fighter would not have been approved for purchase in the United States where requirements included long range.

=== Drop tanks ===
In November 1941, Kelsey asked his Lockheed contacts to design drop tanks to extend the range of the P-38, even though Air Corps policy at the time was absolutely inflexible toward fighter aircraft carrying external fuel tanks—the so-called Bomber Mafia favoring heavy bombers wanted no challenge from fighters and medium bombers in the long-range department. Lockheed proceeded with the request, starting with a batch of 100 P-38Es intended for photo reconnaissance, despite having no written orders, only Kelsey's handshake. Thus, when combat requirements called for longer range via drop tanks, the P-38 was already equipped with fuel lines, hardpoints, and a supply of drop tanks. One famous example of these drop tanks was in Operation Vengeance, April 1943, when P-38Gs needed extra range to intercept and kill Admiral Isoroku Yamamoto.

=== North Atlantic ferry operation ===
In January 1942, a month after the United States declared war, Kelsey was promoted to the temporary rank of lieutenant colonel. In the spring of 1942 Kelsey was attached to the VIII Fighter Command at Dow Field near Bangor, Maine, to assist in preparing for trans-Atlantic ferry flights in support of Operation Bolero. As an acting colonel, Kelsey was assigned to the 14th Fighter Group for the purpose of flying one of the group's fighters and for making sure preparations were sufficient. In July, with the call sign Shoe Black 7, he flew a P-38F in the first ferry flight of fighters across the North Atlantic to England. Returning to the States in September 1942, he resumed his former position as chief of the Pursuit Branch, and the following July he was named chief of the Flight Research Branch, Flight Test Division.

Going to England in November 1943, Kelsey was deputy chief of staff of the IX Fighter Command, and the following February he was appointed chief of the Operation Engineering Section of the Eighth Air Force Headquarters. In February 1945 he was assigned to the Materiel Division at Air Corps Headquarters.

== Staff roles ==
After Germany surrendered, Kelsey was assigned to the Materiel Command at Wright Field as chief of the All-Weather Operations Section. He reverted to the permanent rank of major in 1946, and from December 1946 to January 1948 he served successively as assistant deputy commanding general for personnel; deputy commanding general for personnel, and chief of personnel and administration.

Returning to Air Force Headquarters in February 1948, Kelsey was chief of the Control Group in the Office of the Deputy Chief of Staff for Materiel. Kelsey attained the permanent rank of colonel in April. Entering the National War College in August 1948, he graduated the following June and remained there as an instructor. In June 1952 he was appointed Deputy Director of Research and Development in the Office of the Deputy Chief of Staff for Development at Air Force Headquarters, and was promoted to brigadier general in September.

=== X-15 ===
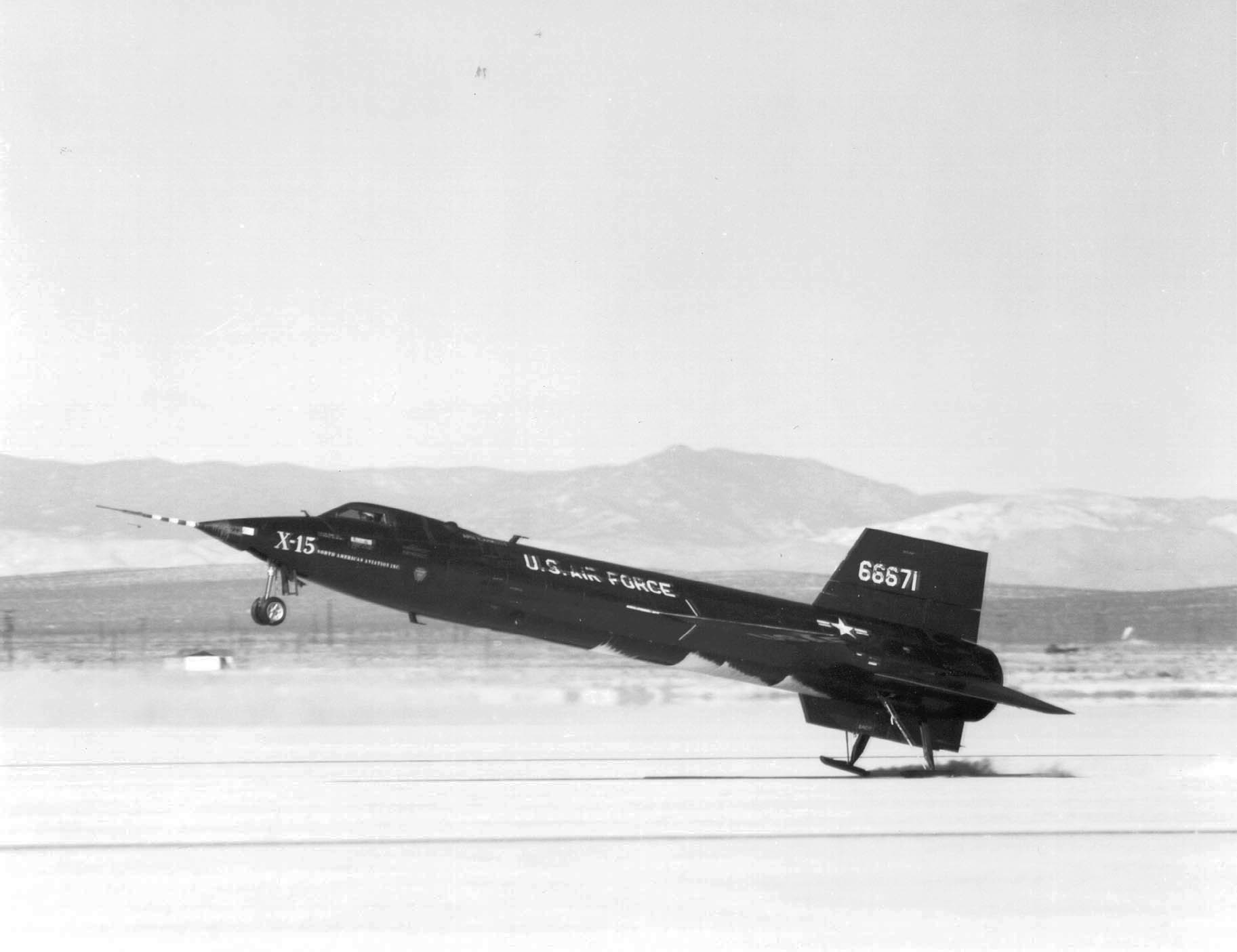
North American X-15 touching down

In October 1954, Kelsey was a key member of the Research Airplane Committee which underwrote the North American X-15. The committee, headed by Hugh Dryden, evaluated the proposed Mach 7 hypersonic aircraft design which aimed to reach altitudes of 300,000 ft. On the committee, Kelsey was sole representative for the Air Force, Dryden represented NACA, and two rear admirals represented the Navy. Dryden convinced the committee to move ahead with the project even though it was not clear there would be any military value gained from it.

Kelsey brought to the project the extensive support of the Air Force Flight Test Center, and began to shop the proposal around the industry. He invited 12 aviation contractors with prior fighter aircraft experience to bid on the project: Bell, Boeing, Chance-Vought, Consolidated (Convair), Douglas, Grumman, Lockheed, Martin, McDonnell, NAA, Northrop and Republic. Nine of these showed up to Kelsey's bidder conference in January 1955 where they were informed of late-1954 NACA wind tunnel research data collected at Langley Research Center. Five more companies dropped out before the May 9, 1955, submission deadline, but Bell, Douglas, North American and Republic responded with designs. The Douglas and NAA designs were ranked the highest, with slightly more interest expressed in the more expensive NAA concept which did not use standard alloys and thus would provide additional research information if implemented. Kelsey, Dryden and the committee awarded NAA the contract on September 30, 1955, even though the company was at capacity designing the XB-70 Valkyrie and F-107.

Kelsey reverted to his permanent rank of colonel December 30, 1955, and retired from active duty the following day.

== Personal life ==
Kelsey married Caryl Rathje and they had three sons: Benjamin Jr., Peter and David. Kelsey continued to fly after retirement. He owned a Cessna 190 and worked to restore a Pitts Special.

Kelsey wrote about aeronautical subjects and gave lectures. In 1959, he was honored by MIT with the Jerome C. Hunsaker Visiting Professor of Aerospace Systems award. In carrying out the duties of the award, Kelsey appeared in March 1960 at MIT, the University of Maryland, College Park and in Los Angeles to give a talk about the factors which determine the optimum size of aircraft. The engineering lecture was published in 1960.

In September 1977, Kelsey was invited to participate in a 50th anniversary symposium celebrating the P-38 Lightning, organized by Lockheed veterans. Tony LeVier, Kelly Johnson and some Lightning aces shared a panel discussion with him, and Kelsey participated in interviews recalling the history of fighter development in World War II.

== The Dragon's Teeth? ==
As the occupant of the Charles A. Lindbergh Chair in Aerospace History at the National Air and Space Museum, Kelsey wrote an overview of American aircraft development before and during World War II. The research was conducted in 1979 and 1980. Kelsey died of cancer at age 74 on March 3, 1981, at his home in Stevensburg, Virginia. The Dragon's Teeth?: The Creation of United States Air Power for World War II was published posthumously by the Smithsonian Institution in 1982.

In The Dragon's Teeth?, Kelsey observed that, for proper defense, a nation must maintain a "force in being", the same concept as 'fleet in being' but applied to the entire military of a nation at peace. He predicted that "Specific measures to counter a specific threat will almost guarantee that if an emergency occurs it will be in a different place and of a different nature." Instead of trying to solve every military challenge in advance, Kelsey wrote that a nation must save its money and keep a core of military engineering and manufacturing industries alive by giving them enough business so that they don't disappear. In response to an attack, these industries could quickly expand to meet the challenge. Kelsey compared this careful husbanding of the potential for war-making effort with the myth of Cadmus, a Phoenician prince who supposedly sowed dragon's teeth in the ground to create an instant army.

== Recognition ==
Kelsey was awarded:

- Distinguished Service Medal
- Legion of Merit
- Distinguished Flying Cross
- Air Medal with two oak leaf clusters
- French Croix de guerre
- Belgian Croix de guerre (Oorlogskruis)
- Octave Chanute Award (1944) from the Institute of Aeronautical Sciences for contributions to high speed flight testing.

== Effective dates of promotion ==
- First lieutenant (permanent) October 1, 1934
- Captain (permanent) May 2, 1939
- Major (temporary) March 15, 1941
- Lieutenant colonel (temporary) January 5, 1942
- Colonel (temporary) March 1, 1942
- Major (permanent) May 2, 1946
- Colonel (permanent) April 2, 1948
- Brigadier general (temporary) September 5, 1952
- Reverted to permanent rank of colonel December 30, 1955.

== See also ==
- Ben Rich
