= Haywood S. Hansell =

US Air Force major general, born 1903

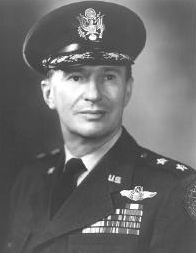
- Hansell, c. 1951
- Born: September 28, 1903; Fort Monroe, Virginia, U.S.
- Died: November 14, 1988 (aged 85); Hilton Head, South Carolina, U.S.
- Burial place: United States Air Force Academy Cemetery
- Military career
- Allegiance: United States of America
- Branch: United States Air Force
- Service years: 1928–1946; 1951–1955
- Rank: Major General
- Nickname: Possum
- Commands: 3rd Bombardment Wing; 1st Bombardment Wing; XXI Bomber Command
- Conflicts: World War II
- Awards: Distinguished Service Medal; Silver Star; Legion of Merit; Distinguished Flying Cross; Air Medal

Haywood Shepherd Hansell Jr. (September 28, 1903 – November 14, 1988) was an American general officer in the United States Army Air Forces (USAAF) during World War II, and later the United States Air Force. He became an advocate of the doctrine of strategic bombardment, and was one of the chief architects of the concept of daylight precision bombing that governed the use of airpower by the USAAF in the war.

Hansell played a key and largely unsung role in the strategic planning of air operations by the United States. This included drafting both the strategic air war plans (AWPD-1 and AWPD-42) and the plan for the Combined Bomber Offensive in Europe; obtaining a base of operations for the B-29 Superfortress in the Mariana Islands; and devising the command structure of the Twentieth Air Force, the first global strategic air force and forerunner of the Strategic Air Command. He made precision air attack, as both the most humane and effective means of achieving military success, a lifelong personal crusade that eventually became the key tenet of American airpower employment. Unfortunately, his air bombardment campaign over Japan proved to be a failure because of various elements, such as the interference of a powerful and consistent jet stream in that nation's airspace. He was replaced by General Curtis LeMay, who reoriented his air forces' tactics in reverse of Hansell's methods for an extremely destructive nighttime area fire bombing campaign over Japan.

Hansell also held combat commands during the war, carrying out the very plans and doctrines he helped draft. He pioneered strategic bombardment of both Germany and Japan, as commander of the first B-17 Flying Fortress combat wing in Europe, and as the first commander of the B-29 force in the Marianas.

== Childhood ==
Hansell was born in Fort Monroe, Virginia, on September 28, 1903, the son of First Lieutenant (later Colonel) Haywood S. Hansell, an Army surgeon, and Susan Watts Hansell, both considered members of the "southern aristocracy" from Georgia. His great-great-great-grandfather John W. Hansell served in the American Revolution, his great-great-grandfather William Young Hansell was an officer in the War of 1812, and his great-grandfather Andrew Jackson Hansell was an adjutant general. His grandfather, William Andrew Hansell, graduated from Georgia Military Institute and also served as an officer in the Confederate Army, first in the 35th Alabama, then as a topographical engineer. (Note: According to Banning, p. 98, William Andrew Hansell was enrolled at LaGrange Military Academy when the 35th Alabama was formed from its faculty and cadets, and served as its adjutant and a lieutenant in Company B. He resigned in 1862 to become a captain of CSA Engineers.)

Shortly after his birth, the family was stationed in Beijing, China, then in the Philippines, and Hansell learned both Chinese and Spanish at an early age. Captain Hansell was next stationed at Fort McPherson, Georgia, in 1913, and then at Fort Benning. His father, a firm disciplinarian, sent Hansell to live on a small, family-owned ranch in New Mexico because of a perceived lack of discipline in his schooling. There he learned horsemanship, shooting, and studied with a tutor.

== Education ==
Hansell entered Sewanee Military Academy, near Chattanooga, Tennessee, in 1916, where he acquired the lifelong nickname "Possum". Although his biographers offer a number of explanations behind the nickname, the most likely is that his facial features gave him the appearance of a possum. At Sewanee he developed a fondness for English literature. As a senior Hansell rose to cadet captain and developed a reputation as a martinet. His harshness with the Corps of Cadets, combined with an excessive number of demerits acquired while the school was temporarily quartered in Jacksonville, Florida, following a fire, led to his reduction to cadet private.

Partly as a result of this humiliation, Hansell declined an appointment to the United States Military Academy to attend the Georgia School of Technology, where he was a member of Sigma Nu. Despite problems understanding differential equations, and twice attempting to transfer to another school, which his father would not permit, he overcame his difficulties with complex mathematics and graduated in 1924 with a Bachelor of Science degree in mechanical engineering. While at Georgia Tech he participated in varsity football as a walk-on substitute, and boxing. Hansell was awarded Georgia Tech's highest individual recognition, membership in the ANAK Society.

From 1924 to 1928 he attempted without success to find employment as a civil engineer in California, where his father was now stationed. Instead he worked as an apprentice and journeyman boilermaker with the Steel Tank and Pipe Company in Berkeley, California. Advances in aviation in the 1920s led Hansell to undertake a career in aeronautical engineering, and to gain flying experience, he decided to join the United States Army Air Corps.

== Personality and family ==
Short in stature and slightly built, Hansell worked at being an athlete, becoming proficient in tennis, polo, and squash. Socially, he was a noted dancer, and acquired a reputation as "the unofficial poet laureate of the Air Corps." He was fond of Gilbert and Sullivan, Shakespeare, and Miguel de Cervantes' Don Quixote. General Ira C. Eaker described him as "nervous and high strung," and one biographer noted several incidents of imperious temper in social situations. However his correspondence secretary during World War II, T/Sgt. James Cooper, described him as "pleasant and diplomatic," and an aviation historian described him as "a forward-looking optimist with a sense of humor."

While stationed at Langley Field, Virginia, Hansell met his wife, Dorothy "Dotta" Rogers, a teacher from Waco, Texas, where they were married in 1932. He fathered three children, son "Tony" (Haywood S. Hansell III, born in 1933), daughter Lucia (1940), and son Dennett (1941). While frequent absences, long working hours, and Hansell's autocratic nature severely stressed their marriage during World War II, they remained married for 56 years until his death in 1988. Hansell's eldest son continued the family military tradition, graduating from the United States Military Academy in 1955, becoming a colonel in the United States Air Force, (Note: Col. Tony Hansell was a KC-97 and KC-135 pilot, a Forward Air Controller in Vietnam, and F-4 Phantom pilot with the 80th TFS in Japan. He followed in his father's footsteps by instructing at the Air Command and Staff College, and then holding staff positions in Strategy and Doctrine, with a tour as Assistant Deputy Chief of Staff-Plans, Headquarters USAF. Col. Hansell retired in 1985 and died in 2004. General Hansell's granddaughter, Lt. Col. Jennifer T. (Hansell) Perry, a USAF Security Forces officer, is the seventh generation to serve in the military, fourth generation career officer, and third generation Air Force. Per West-Point.org and obituary, San Antonio Express-News, December 6, 2004.) and marrying Olivia Twining, the daughter of General Nathan F. Twining.

== Early Air Corps career ==
=== Pursuit pilot ===
U.S. Army Air Corps roundel

On February 23, 1928, Hansell was appointed a flying cadet. He completed primary and basic flying schools at March Field, California, then advanced flight training in pursuit flying at Kelly Field, Texas. He graduated from pilot training on February 28, 1929, and was commissioned a second lieutenant in the Army Reserve. He received a regular commission as a second lieutenant, Air Corps, on May 2, 1929.

Hansell's first duty assignment was with the 2nd Bombardment Group at Langley Field, testing repaired aircraft. In June 1930, he spent three months temporary duty with the 6th Field Artillery at Fort Hoyle, Maryland. In September 1930, he returned to Langley Field and was detached to the Air Corps Tactical School as armament officer. While stationed at Langley, Hansell was involved in two minor accidents in aircraft he was piloting, and in early 1931 was forced to parachute to safety when his Boeing P-12 stalled during a test flight, going into an unrecoverable spin. He was found at fault for the accident and initially charged $10,000 by the Air Corps for the expense of the aircraft, but the cost was eventually written off.

In August 1931, Hansell was transferred to Maxwell Field, Alabama, as assistant operations officer, with flying duties in the 54th School Squadron, to support the ACTS, which had located to Maxwell from Langley in July. During that tour of duty he met Captain Claire L. Chennault, an instructor at the Tactical School, and joined "The Men on the Flying Trapeze", (Note: Sometimes incorrectly seen as "Three Men on a Flying Trapeze".) an Air Corps aerobatic and demonstration team. (Note: The team in 1932 consisted of Chennault, Hansell, and Sgt. John H. "Luke" Williamson. When Hansell left the team, he was replaced by Sgt. William C. "Billy" McDonald. The two sergeants later became flight instructors in China.) The team performed at the National Air Races at Cleveland, Ohio, in September 1934. Hansell also worked with Captain Harold L. George, chief of the Tactical School's bombardment section, where his military interest shifted from pursuits to bombers. (Note: Harold Lee George's reputation as a bombardment proponent was such that he was known in the service as "Bomber George" to distinguish him from Harold Huston George, a peer of nearly identical age and service experience, whose status as an ace during World War I and career in fighter units resulted in his moniker of "Pursuit George.") The friendship that developed from the working relationship led to George becoming both Hansell's mentor and patron.

=== Disciple of strategic airpower ===
Hansell was promoted to first lieutenant on October 1, 1934, and entered the Air Corps Tactical School at Maxwell Field as a student in the comprehensive 845-hour, 36-week course, studying not only air tactics and airpower theory, which comprised more than half of the curriculum, but also tactics of other services, combined (joint) warfare, armament and gunnery, logistics, navigation and meteorology, staff duties, photography, combat orders, and antiaircraft defenses. Among his instructors was Captain George, now director of the Department of Air Tactics and Strategy. George's classes were half lecture, half free discussion and conceptualizing, with George or his assistant Capt. Odas Moon expounding theories and having the students critically examine them for flaws and alternative ideas, debates that continued beyond the classroom as well.

Making up the 59 members of his class were five majors, 40 captains, 13 first lieutenants including himself, and one second lieutenant. In addition to 49 Air Corps officers were four Army officers, one from each of that service's combat arms, two Turkish Army aviators, one Mexican captain, and three Marine Corps aviators, including two future major generals. (Note: The future USMC generals were Lawson Sanderson, who commanded Pappy Boyington's air group in World War II, and future Director of Marine Aviation William J. Wallace. Wallace commanded all combat support aviation on Okinawa, including USAAF squadrons.) Among Hansell's Air Corps classmates were future generals Muir S. Fairchild, Barney Giles, Laurence S. Kuter, and Hoyt S. Vandenberg; test pilot Lester J. Maitland; and aviation pioneer Major Vernon Burge, who as a corporal in June 1912 had been the first certified enlisted military pilot. Hansell graduated in June 1935 and was invited to become an instructor at ACTS, one of nine in his class to become ACTS instructors, and the youngest in its history. He served on the faculty from 1935 to 1938 in the Department of Air Tactic's all-important Air Force Section, first under George, then Major Donald Wilson (another strategic bombing advocate), and lastly Fairchild.

Hansell became a member of a group known as the "Bomber Mafia", ACTS instructors who were both outspoken proponents of the doctrine of daylight precision strategic bombardment and advocates for an independent Air Force. Among the students instructed by Hansell were Eaker, Twining, Elwood R. Quesada, Earle E. Partridge, Kenneth Wolfe, Orvil A. Anderson, John K. Cannon, and Newton Longfellow, all of whom became general officers and strategic airpower advocates during World War II. During this time, Hansell also had a permanent falling out with Chennault after Chennault tried to recruit him to go to China to fly fighters for the Kuomintang government.

In September 1938, still a first lieutenant, Hansell entered the Command and General Staff School at Fort Leavenworth, Kansas, from which he was graduated in June 1939, shortly after promotion to captain. He then was assigned to the Office, Chief of Air Corps (OCAC), under General Henry H. Arnold, working a series of assignments as Arnold assembled an Air Staff to plan and execute a massive expansion of the Air Corps.

After duty in the Public Relations Section, OCAC from July 1 to September 5, 1939, he became assistant Executive Officer, OCAC to Ira Eaker from September 6 to November 20, 1939. In November 1939 he created, with Major Thomas D. White, the Intelligence Section, Information Division, OCAC. Hansell was its Officer in Charge, Air Corps Intelligence from November 21, 1939, to June 30, 1940; and its Chief, Operations Planning Branch, Foreign Intelligence Section from July 1, 1940, to June 30, 1941. He was promoted to major on March 15, 1941.

In the Air Intelligence Section, Hansell became responsible for setting up strategic air intelligence and analysis operations, creating three sections: analysis of foreign air forces and their doctrines, analysis of airfields worldwide including climate data, and preparation of target selection for major foreign powers. Much of the work was accomplished despite hindrance from the War Department's G-2 office, which felt that such analysis was not "proper military intelligence." Development of sources of information for such analyses also was primitive, and he used his assignment to OPB to recruit a number of civilian economic experts who had recently been commissioned in the military. Hansell also created contacts among Royal Air Force officers stationed in Washington, D.C. to enhance his sources.

On July 7, 1941, Hansell went to London, England, as a special observer attached to the military attaché, where he was privy to the inner workings of RAF intelligence and their target folders on the German industrial infrastructure. In his memoir, Hansell stated that in the exchange of information, the AAF received nearly a ton of material, shipped back to the United States in a bomber.

== AWPD-1 ==
"It is far beyond my ability to adequately describe the frustrations, disappointments, fragile hopes, determination, and soaring zeal that were mixed in the cauldron to make AWPD-1 and the plans modifying it. The frantic efforts to meet deadlines, the disagreements, the uphill fight against entrenched and hostile opinion, the dedicated crusade for the new role of air power, the slumbering dread that we might be wrong—that we might persuade our leaders to take a path that would lead to disaster—put a heavy burden on all of us."

— Haywood S. Hansell – The Strategic Air War Against Germany and Japan: A Memoir

On July 12, 1941, Hansell, just returned from London, was recruited by Harold George to join the Air War Plans Division of the newly created AAF Air Staff in Washington, D.C., as its Chief of European Branch. There a strategic planning team of former "bomber mafia" members (himself, George, Kuter, and War Plans Group chief Lt. Col. Kenneth N. Walker), put together an estimate for President Franklin D. Roosevelt of the numbers of aircraft and personnel needed to win a war against the Axis Powers, well beyond the scope requested of it by the War Plans Division of the General Staff.

Hansell's responsibility in the plan, designated AWPD–1, was information on German targets. Arnold had given George nine days to write the plan, which would be "Annex 2, Air Requirements" to "The Victory Program", a plan of strategic estimates involving the entire U.S. military.

Beginning on August 4, 1941, they drew up the plan in accordance with strategic policies promulgated earlier that year, outlined in the ABC-1 agreement with the British Commonwealth, and Rainbow 5, the U.S. war plan. The group completed AWPD-1 in the allotted nine days and carefully rehearsed a presentation to the Army General Staff. Its forecast figures, despite planning errors from lack of accurate information about weather and the German economic commitment to the war, were within 2 percent of the units and 5.5 percent of the personnel ultimately mobilized, and it accurately predicted the time frame when the invasion of Europe by the Allies would take place.

Hansell's contribution to the plan was based on a serious mistake, however. As had most observers, Hansell assumed that the Nazi economy was working at maximum capacity, when in fact it was still at 1938 levels of production, an error that led to an underestimation of the numbers of sorties, bomb tonnage, and time required for bombing to have a decisive effect. However, a more significant error in planning, the omission of long-range fighter escorts for the bombers, seriously affected the strategic bombing campaign that later took place. Hansell deeply regretted the omission but noted that it reflected the best available information at the time on fighter aircraft capabilities, which was that any means then available to extend range would also seriously degrade a fighter's air combat performance. Hansell wrote, "Failure to see this issue through proved one of the Air Corps Tactical School's major shortcomings."

A lack of knowledge about the capability of radar to create an effective centralized early warning system also contributed to the over-reliance on the self-defense capabilities of bombers. However Hansell also argued that ignorance of radar was fortuitous in the long run. He surmised that had radar been a factor in making doctrine, many theorists would have reasoned that massed defenses would make all strategic air attacks too costly, inhibiting if not entirely suppressing the concepts that proved decisive in World War II and essential to the creation of the United States Air Force.

== World War II service ==
=== Planning duties ===
Following the entry of the United States into World War II, Hansell received a rapid series of promotions, to lieutenant colonel on January 5, 1942, colonel on March 1, 1942, and brigadier general on August 10, 1942. In January 1942, he assisted George and Walker in presenting an organizational plan to the War Department for maintaining the Air Corps as part of the Army during World War II, while dividing the Army into three autonomous branches, a reorganization adopted on March 9, 1942, with the creation of the Army Air Forces, Army Ground Forces and Services of Supply. On March 10, 1942, Hansell was transferred from AWPD to the Strategy and Policy Group, Operations Division of the War Department General Staff and served on the eight-member Joint Strategy Committee as the USAAF representative.

Hansell, at the request of Major General Dwight D. Eisenhower, was assigned on July 12, 1942, as Officer in Charge, Air Section, ETOUSA headquarters, and simultaneously as deputy theater air officer for Major General Carl A. Spaatz, commander of the Eighth Air Force. His duties were to mold Eisenhower's opinion on the use of airpower, guided by Spaatz, but there is little indication that he succeeded. He also flew combat in a B-17 to gain first-hand experience with daylight precision bombing, attacking the Longueau marshalling yard at Amiens, France, on August 20, 1942. During the mission he developed frostbite on his hands and spent several days recovering from the effects.

On August 26, 1942, he was recalled to USAAF Headquarters to head the planning team for AWPD–42, a revision of the air strategy plan in light of ongoing crises in the war, completing it in 11 days. Even though the Navy rejected the plan outright (because it did not participate in its writing) and the Joint Chiefs of Staff did not accept it, presidential advisor Harry Hopkins recommended to Roosevelt that he follow the precepts unofficially, which was done. Hansell then returned to England, where he was ironically tasked with diverting a large portion of the strategic bomber force to the Twelfth Air Force to support Operation Torch.

=== Combat wing commander in Europe ===
On December 5, 1942, Hansell received his first combat command, the 3rd Bombardment Wing. Originally one of the three wings of General Headquarters Air Force, (Note: The 3rd Bombardment Wing was later redesignated the 98th Bomb Wing of the Ninth Air Force.) the 3rd was now part of the Eighth Air Force in England, planned as a Martin B-26 Marauder unit with the mission of supporting the Eighth's heavy bomber operations by bombing Luftwaffe fighter airfields. However the wing had no aircraft or units yet assigned, and on January 2, 1943, Hansell was shifted to command the 1st Bombardment Wing, the Boeing B-17 Flying Fortress component of VIII Bomber Command. (Note: Hansell's predecessor was Laurence Kuter, who had been transferred to North Africa as part of "Torch".) Hansell flew his first mission with his new command the next day to bomb the submarine pens at Saint-Nazaire, France. He saw first hand the effectiveness of German interceptors, as both wingmen of Hansell's bomber were shot down. Later that month, on a January 13 mission to Lille, France, the pilot of the B-17 in which he flew was killed in action and the plane nearly shot down.

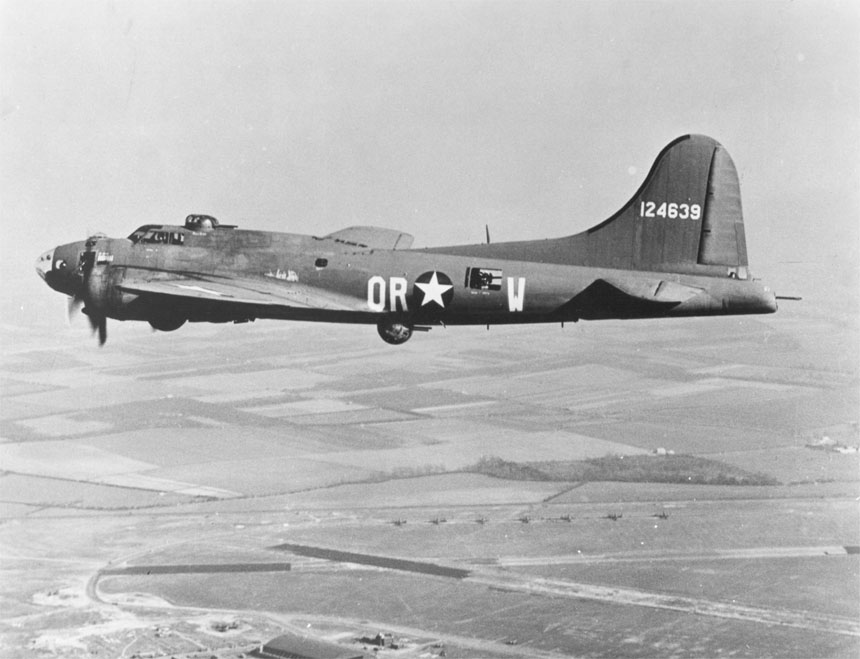
8th Air Force B-17 over RAF Bassingbourn

Hansell commanded the 1st Wing during six critical months when the B-17 force, with only four inexperienced groups, struggled to prove itself. Among the combat doctrines that Hansell developed himself or approved were use of the defensive combat box formation, detailed mission standard operating procedures, and all aircraft bombing in unison with the lead bomber, each designed to improve bombing accuracy.

Hansell recognized the most serious flaws in the daylight precision bombardment theory, that:

- Radar early warning and the lack of long-range escort fighters made deep penetration raids by massed bombers too costly to achieve strategic goals until a means of air superiority was attained, and that
- German industry, rather than being fragile and fixed, proved to be resilient and mobile.

These factors later influenced his planning of similar daylight raids against Japan.

Allied air power was decisive in the war in Western Europe. Hindsight inevitably suggests that it might have been employed differently or better in some respects. Nevertheless, it was decisive"

— United States Strategic Bombing Survey

On March 23, 1943, he headed up a committee of USAAF and RAF commanders to draw up a plan for the Combined Bomber Offensive (CBO). Despite the fact that it altered the target system priorities outlined in AWPD-42, and changed the overall goal of the offensive from knocking Germany out of the war using airpower to one of preparing for the invasion of Europe, Hansell approved the designation of the German aircraft industry as its most important target and the destruction of the German Luftwaffe as its top priority. Hansell wrote the final draft of the CBO plan himself. Although Hansell did not personally participate in later strategic bombing operations against Germany, he had been instrumental in setting in motion the plans and policies that led to the near total destruction of German war industry.

He continued to fly combat missions at the same rate as his group commanders, with his final mission to Antwerp on May 4, 1943, the date that the Joint Chiefs approved the CBO plan. On June 15, 1943, noting signs of fatigue and stress, Eaker decided to replace Hansell in command of the 1st Wing with veteran commander Brigadier General Frank A. Armstrong Jr., (Note: Armstrong did not command the wing long, injured in a fire in his quarters in July.) but retained him as a staff officer, first as an air planner in the COSSAC (Chief of Staff Supreme Allied Commander) headquarters until August 1, 1943, when Eisenhower named him deputy commander of the Allied Expeditionary Air Force. He conjointly was part of the Tactical Air Force Planning Committee, where he oversaw the planning for Operation Tidal Wave, the low-level bombing of oil refineries at Ploieşti, Romania, on August 1, 1943, and recommended approval of the Schweinfurt-Regensburg mission. While in Washington on this task, he was "captured" by Arnold and accompanied him to the Quadrant Conference in August, where he personally briefed President Roosevelt on strategic bombing to that point.

=== B-29 operations planning ===
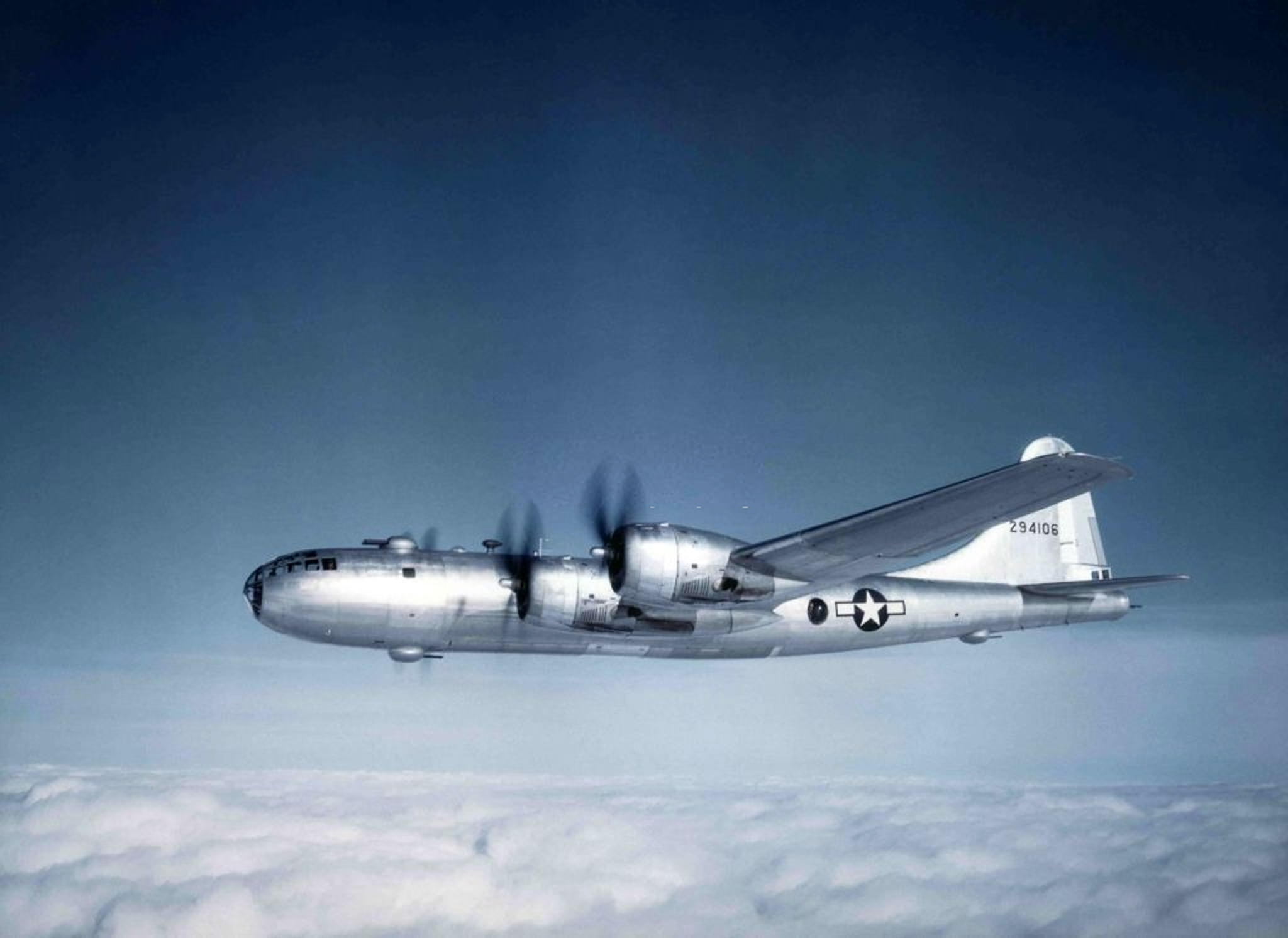
B-29 Superfortress

In October 1943, General Hansell was appointed chief of the Combined and Joint Staff Division, in the Office of the Assistant Chief of Air Staff for Plans, located at Headquarters USAAF. As such he became Air Planner on the Joint Planning Staff. He immediately affected planning of strategic air attacks on Japan. The JPS draft outline denigrated strategic bombing and declared that an invasion of the home islands was the only means of defeating Japan, but Hansell successfully argued that an invasion should be a contingency and occur only if bombing and a sea blockade of Japan failed to compel a surrender.

Hansell accompanied President Roosevelt and the Joint Chiefs aboard the USS Iowa to the Sextant Conference in November, then was appointed Deputy Chief of the Air Staff in December, working directly with Arnold. His main responsibility was developing the operational plans for the B-29 Superfortress, and he succeeded in gaining three key decisions from the JCS: there would be no diversion of B-29s to General Douglas MacArthur, the schedule for Operation Forager was moved forward more than a year to secure bases for the B-29 in the Mariana Islands, (Note: The invasion, a pet project of CNO Admiral Ernest J. King, had tentatively been set for early 1946, if at all.) and Twentieth Air Force operations would be entirely independent of control by all three Pacific theater commanders (MacArthur, Chester W. Nimitz, and Joseph Stilwell), reporting directly to the JCS.

Hansell drew up the tactical doctrine, SOPs, and the table of organization and equipment of the Twentieth Air Force, which was to be commanded by Arnold personally, including use of AAF Air Staff as the staff of the Twentieth. In addition to his own Air Staff duties, Hansell became chief of staff of the Twentieth Air Force on April 6, 1944. When Arnold was incapacitated by a heart attack in May, Hansell acted as de facto commander of the Twentieth Air Force.

=== B-29 commander ===
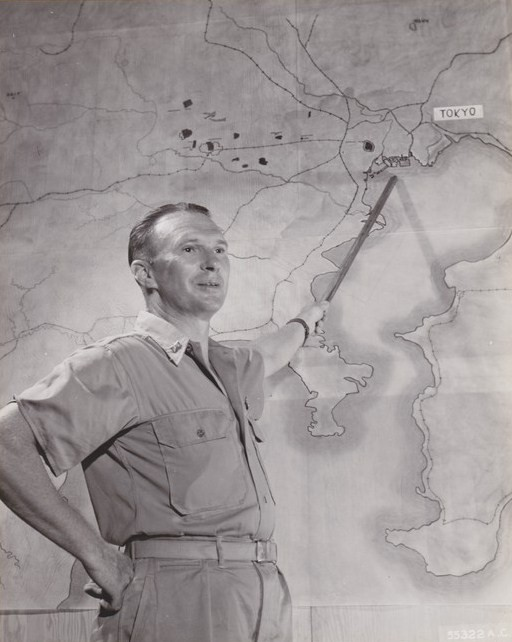
Brigadier General Hansell posing with a map of the Tokyo region during November 1944

On August 28, 1944, Arnold made Hansell commander of the XXI Bomber Command, despite misgivings among several senior leaders that while a superb staff officer, he did not have the "temperament" to be a combat commander. Aware of Arnold's legendary impatience, deputy AAF commander General Barney Giles, who was doubtful that Hansell could accomplish the task given him—setting up an effective air campaign in a brief period using an untried aircraft—obtained a commitment from Arnold that he would not relieve Hansell in only a few months. However Hansell's tenure was threatened from the start because his replacement on the Air Staff, Major General Lauris Norstad, did not support the concept of daylight precision bombing, instead advocating massive destruction of Japanese cities by firebombing, a tactic that had been promoted in AAF planning circles as early as November 1943. Fire raids on Japan were rapidly gaining widespread acceptance among AAF leaders, including Arnold, both to defeat Japan before an invasion was mounted and to satisfy a perception that the American public wanted revenge for three bloody years of war. Hansell, however, opposed the tactic as both morally repugnant and militarily unnecessary.

XXI Bomber Command arrived on Saipan on October 12, 1944, and from the start, Hansell was beset by a host of serious command problems, the worst of which were continued teething problems with the B-29, tardy delivery of aircraft, aircrews untrained in high altitude formation flying, primitive airfield conditions, lack of an air service command for logistical support, no repair depots, a total absence of target intelligence, stubborn internal resistance to daylight operations by his sole combat wing, (Note: Strong resistance by the Japanese during the seizure of the Marianas and subsequent low construction priorities assigned by the Navy resulted in up to two months' delay in the deployment of two additional wings scheduled to begin operations in December 1944 and January 1945. (Craven and Cate, Vol. 5, pp. 515–522, 569)) subordinates in the XXI Bomber Command who lobbied for his removal, and Hansell's inferiority in rank in dealing with other AAF commanders in the theater. (Note: Hansell's difficulties were exacerbated by petty jurisdictional resistance from the Army commander of the Pacific Ocean Area in Hawaii, General Robert C. Richardson, Jr., and the low priorities assigned to the buildup of Hansell's facilities in the Marianas by Nimitz's staff in favor of roads and naval installations, despite XXI BC being the only force on the islands conducting continuous combat operations. (Craven And Cate, Vol. 5, pp. 533–534, and 542).) Furthermore, Hansell was soon prohibited from flying combat missions with his command, possibly because of limited knowledge of the atomic bomb or the perception that he knew the existence of Ultra.

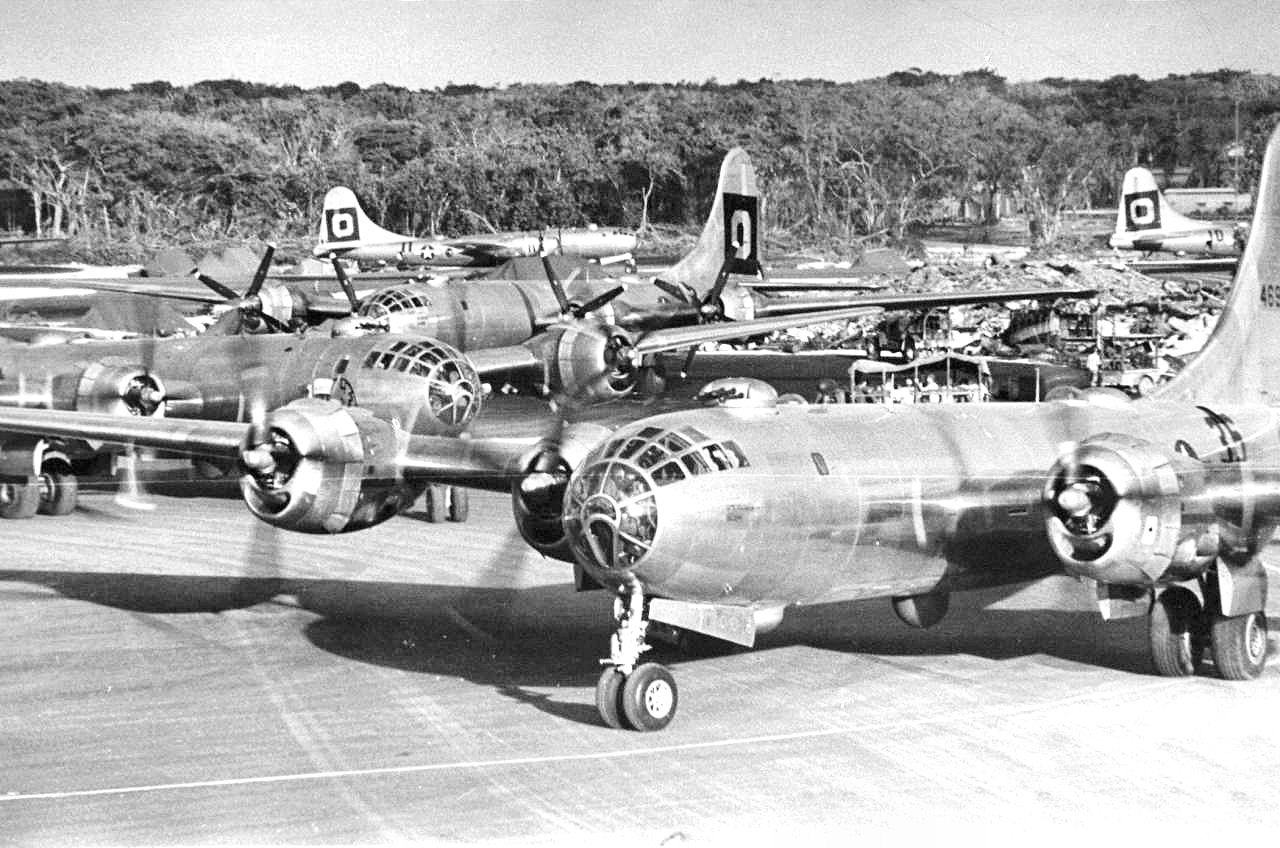
B-29 bombers of XXI Bomber Command

High altitude daylight B-29 raids against the Japanese aircraft industry began November 24, 1944 with operation San Antonio I, despite misgivings about high losses by both combat crews and Arnold. (Note: Only one B-29 was lost on the mission; it was rammed in the tail by a damaged interceptor. (Craven and Cate, Vol. 5, p. 559).) They were hampered by bad weather and jet stream winds and as a result appeared unproductive. Pressured by Arnold (through Norstad as an intermediary) for results, Hansell subjected his command to intensive corrective measures that caused more resentment among his aircrews. At the same time, commanders in China were strongly recommending removal of XX Bomber Command to another theater as soon as possible, which made Major General Curtis E. LeMay, now superior to Hansell in rank, available for command.

On January 6, 1945, Norstad visited Hansell's headquarters, abruptly relieved him of command, and replaced him with LeMay. (Note: Norstad and Hansell had worked closely together before Hansell's assignment to XXI BC and were personal friends. (Craven and Cate, Vol. 5, p. 567)) Hansell was offered the option of commanding XX Bomber Command while it transitioned to Guam, then becoming LeMay's deputy. Although he and LeMay were friends, LeMay had been Hansell's subordinate in England, and Hansell declined the offer. While all the command problems factored into his relief, the main reasons were Hansell's persistence in daylight precision attacks, reluctance to night firebombing, Norstad's view that Hansell was an impediment to instituting incendiary attacks, and the perception by Arnold and Norstad that the public relations effort by XXI Bomber Command had been unsatisfactory in preparing the American public for such attacks.

Hansell left Guam on January 21, 1945. Unknown at the time, his precision daylight attacks had succeeded, first in Japan's immediate and inefficient dispersion of its aircraft engine industry, and later in terms of actual destruction caused by the final raid under his command. A more immediate legacy of his command was his creation, in conjunction with the U.S. Navy, of an effective air-sea rescue system that saved half of all B-29 crews downed at sea in 1945.

== Impact on strategic doctrine ==
Hansell outlined an alternate strategy for defeating Japan of using precision bombing as its basis, which he believed would have also succeeded by November 1945 and obviate the need for either area bombing using incendiaries or using the atomic bomb. He did not find fault with the incendiary strategy per se, but rather with the premise that fire-bombing was necessary because otherwise Japan could not be defeated except by invasion of her home islands. Historian Michael Sherry concluded that the case he presented was "powerful". Arnold by implication had erred in changing AAF strategy, especially by taking into account the "deep and pervasive revulsion among the American people against strategic bombing of all sorts" that was a consequence.

"in all probability prior to 1 November 1945, Japan would have surrendered even if the atomic bomb had not been dropped, even if Russia had not entered the war, and even if no invasion had been planned or contemplated."

— United States Strategic Bombing Survey

The historian and Hansell biographer Dr. Charles Griffith concluded that Hansell sacrificed his command of the B-29 force and his later career on principle and adhered to the idea that precision, rather than area, bombing was more moral and also more effective as a strategy. His dismissal, Griffith argues, was a pivotal event in U.S. airpower doctrine, as the Air Force moved toward a strategy of bombing civilian populations, which led to an increasing dependence on the more potentially devastating, inflexible, and "Douhetian" doctrine of nuclear warfare that lasted for decades.

Conrad Crane took a somewhat different stance by arguing that despite the firebombing campaign in Japan, American air commanders throughout World War II and thereafter placed an emphasis on precision bombing and avoiding civilian casualties. The use of precision guided weapons in the Gulf War and beyond, he wrote, demonstrated "continued adherence to precision-bombing doctrine and...significant progress toward the ideal...first envisioned" by Hansell and the other Air Corps Tactical School theorists.

Hansell lectured on the theory of precision air attack throughout his life, particularly at the United States Air Force Academy and the Air War College. He authored three books on air strategy: The Air War Plan That Defeated Hitler (1972), The Strategic Air War Against Japan (1980), and Strategic Air War Against Germany and Japan: A Memoir (1986). Hansell continued to study modern weapons systems and became an advocate of the Strategic Defense Initiative and the B-2 Spirit bomber. However his main focus was in promoting technical advances in precision guided weapons to make precision bombing more practical and therefore more desirable as a military strategy.

== Retirement ==
After his removal from command on Guam, Hansell at his own request received a B-29 training assignment on February 15, 1945, command of the 38th Flying Training Wing at Williams Field, Arizona. (Note: Fogerty, Historical Study 91, specifically states Williams Field, not Kirtland, as is often seen.) In June 1945, he was transferred to Air Transport Command under his old mentor Lieutenant General Harold George, commanding the Caribbean Wing at West Palm Beach, Florida, from September 30, 1945, to January 14, 1946, and the North Atlantic Wing at Westover Field, Massachusetts, from July 1, 1946, to August 18, 1946.

Hansell took early retirement because of a loss-of-hearing disability, retiring with the rank of brigadier general on December 31, 1946. He held positions as vice president of Peruvian International Airlines until Peru nationalized the airline in 1949 and vice president of South Atlantic Gas Company from 1949 until his recall to the military.

He was recalled to active duty on July 15, 1951, by Air Force Chief of Staff Hoyt S. Vandenberg and assigned as Chief, Military Assistance Program Headquarters, USAF, acting as a senior program manager and advisor to the U.S. Joint Chiefs of Staff. On September 5, 1952, he was promoted to major general. In April 1953, Hansell was appointed the senior Air Force representative to the Weapons Systems Evaluation Group in the Research and Development Office of the Secretary of Defense, Washington, D.C. He retired a second time from the USAF in 1955.

Hansell worked for General Electric, becoming head of its subsidiary in the Netherlands until 1967, when he retired to Hilton Head, South Carolina. He died on November 14, 1988, in Hilton Head, of heart failure and pulmonary edema, as he was preparing to leave for a lecture in Canada. He was interred with full military honors at the United States Air Force Academy Cemetery.

== Awards and decorations ==
Hansell's decorations include:

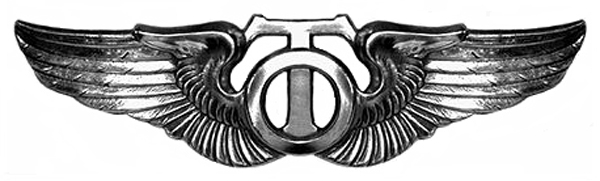

U.S. Air Force Command Pilot Badge
USAAF Technical Observer Badge
Army Distinguished Service Medal	Silver Star	Legion of Merit
Distinguished Flying Cross	Air Medal	Army Commendation Medal
American Defense Service Medal	American Campaign Medal	Asiatic-Pacific Campaign Medal with bronze campaign star
European-African-Middle Eastern Campaign Medal with bronze campaign star	World War II Victory Medal	National Defense Service Medal
Air Force Longevity Service Award with four bronze oak leaf clusters	Honorary Commander of the Order of the British Empire (United Kingdom)	Order of Merit of the Italian Republic degree unknown (Italy)

== Notes ==
Footnotes

Citations
