= Richard Carmichael =

Richard Carmichael may refer to:

- Richard Bennett Carmichael (1807–1884), American politician
- Richard Carmichael (physician) (1779–1849), Irish surgeon, medical writer and philanthropist
- Richard H. Carmichael, United States Air Force officer
