= Air War Plans Division =

American military organization

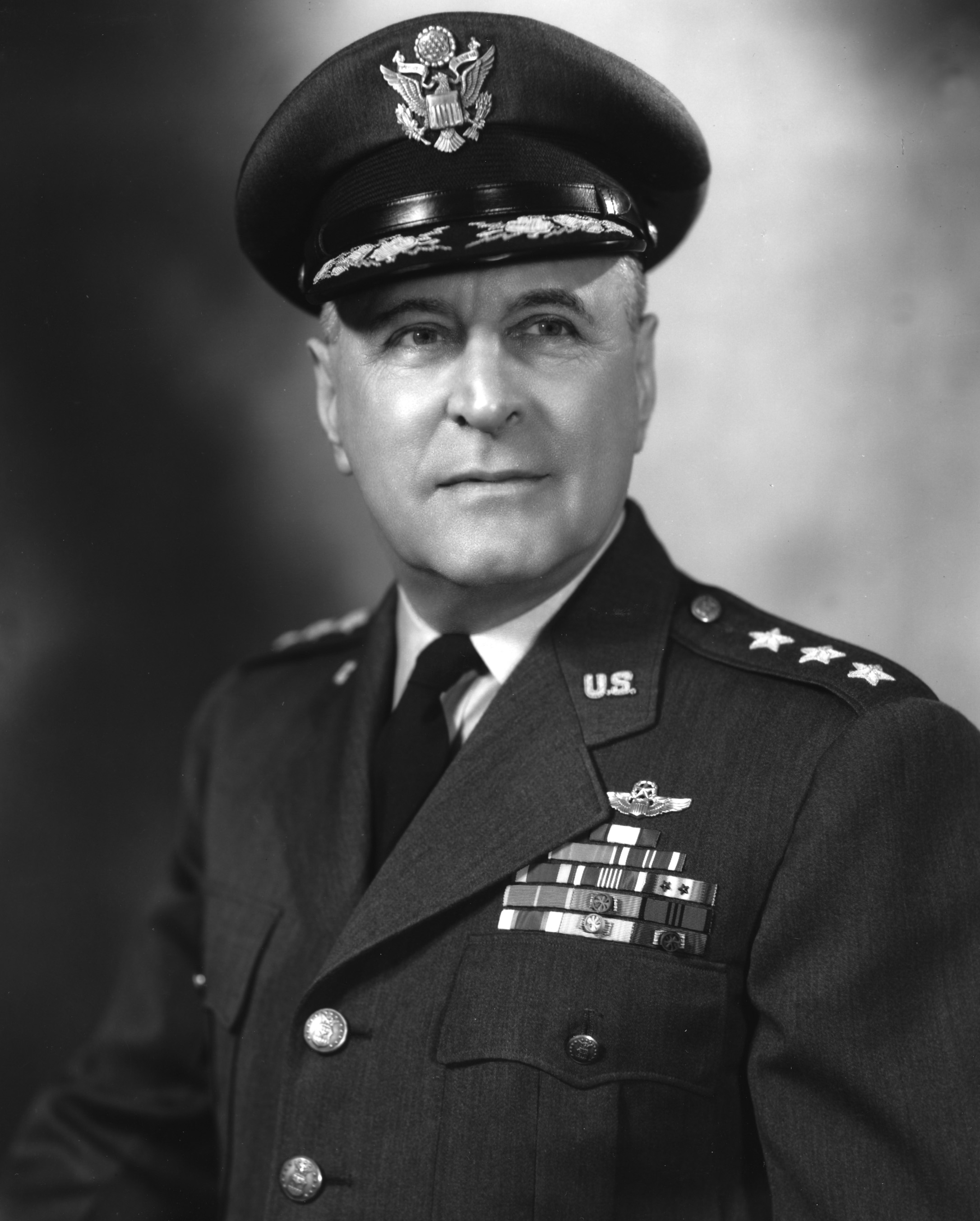
Harold L. George

The Air War Plans Division (AWPD) was an American military organization established to make long-term plans for war. Headed by Harold L. George, the unit was tasked in July 1941 to provide President Franklin D. Roosevelt with "overall production requirements required to defeat our potential enemies." The plans that were made at the AWPD eventually proved significant in the defeat of Nazi Germany.

The AWPD went beyond offering basic production requirements and provided a comprehensive air plan which was designed to defeat the Axis powers. The plan, AWPD-1, was completed in nine days. The plan emphasized using heavy bombers to carry out precision bombing attacks as the primary method of defeating Germany and its allies. A year later, after the United States became directly involved in World War II, AWPD delivered a second plan—AWPD-42—which slightly changed the earlier plan to incorporate lessons learned from eight months of the war. Neither AWPD-1 nor AWPD-42 were approved as combat battle plans or war operations; they were simply accepted as guidelines for the production of materiel and the creation of necessary air squadrons. Finally, in 1943, an operational aerial warfare plan was agreed in meetings between American and British war planners, based on a combination of British plans and those from the AWPD, to create the Anglo-American Combined Bomber Offensive (CBO).

== Founding ==
On 20 June 1941, the United States Army Air Forces (USAAF) were established as a way to combine and streamline two conflicting air commands: GHQ Air Force and the Army Air Corps. Major General Henry H. Arnold commanded the USAAF and formed an Air Staff to lead it; within the Air Staff, the Air War Plans Division was established with Lieutenant Colonel Harold L. George at its head. George was to coordinate his planning efforts with the War Plans Division (WPD) of the War Department.

Up to this point, the WPD was responsible for planning all aspects of Army and Army Air Corps expansion in the U.S. George was challenged by WPD, which contested AWPD's and Air Staff's authority to make strategic plans. WPD recommended that AWPD should be limited to tactical planning, and that the Air Staff, in a subordinate role, should advise the WPD rather than make its own operational or strategic plans. George pushed for greater autonomy—he wished to prepare all plans for all air operations.

On 9 July 1941, President Roosevelt asked Frank Knox, the Secretary of the Navy, and Henry L. Stimson, the Secretary of War, for an exploration of the total war production required for the United States to prevail in case of war. The WPD, in order to project long-term numbers, realized that the Rainbow 5 plan would be used as a basis for production quantities, but it lacked detailed air power figures. Stimson requested of Robert A. Lovett, Assistant Secretary of War for Air, that the USAAF be tapped for their ideas about production numbers. After some bureaucratic delay, the AWPD received the request.

== AWPD-1 ==
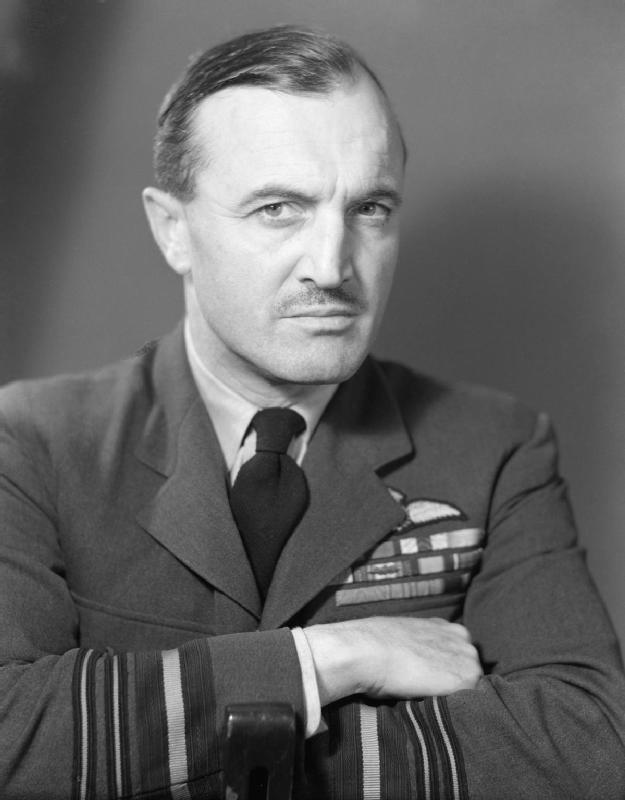
RAF Air Vice-Marshal John Slessor proposed a combined Anglo-American strategic bombing campaign.

In early 1941, American, Canadian and British war planners convened in Washington D.C. for a series of secret planning sessions called the American–British Conference, or ABC-1, to determine a course of action should the United States become a belligerent in the war. An overarching strategy of Europe first was agreed to, where American energies would primarily be directed against Germany, Italy and their European conquests, during which a secondary defensive posture was to be held against Japan. Royal Air Force Air Vice-Marshal John Slessor and other airmen present at the conference agreed on the general concept of using strategic bombing by both British and American air units based in the United Kingdom to reduce Axis military power in Europe. Incorporating this work in April 1941, the joint U.S. Army-Navy Board developed Rainbow 5, the final version of general military guidelines the U.S. would follow in case of war.

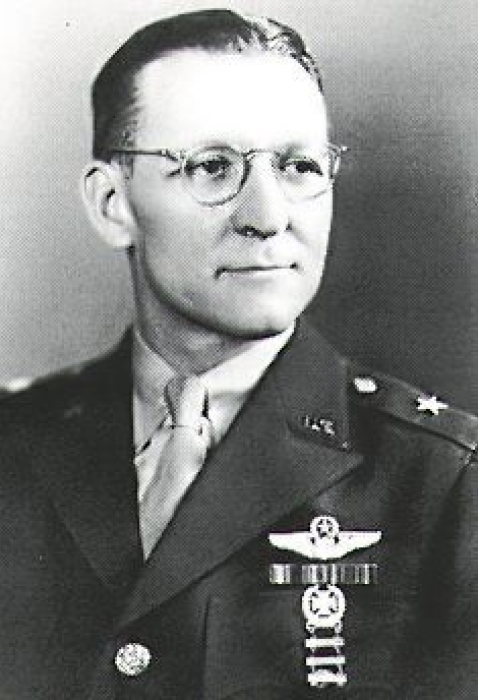
Kenneth Walker

At the beginning of August 1941, the AWPD consisted of only four officers: Harold L. George, Orvil Anderson, Kenneth Walker (each one a lieutenant colonel), and Major Haywood S. Hansell. To help answer the urgent need for planning, George could have sent a couple of his air officers to WPD to assist them, following the standard Army policy since air warfare first arose in World War I. An air plan would have been made emphasizing tactical air coordination with ground forces, one which targeted Axis military formations and supplies in preparation and support of an invasion. George wished to implement the strategic bombing theories that had been debated and refined at the Air Corps Tactical School (ACTS) during the preceding decade, but was sure that the Army and the War Department would not accept a strategy that assumed air attack would prevail alone. Instead, he intended to implement a middle path which began with strategic air attack but contained allowances for the eventual support of a ground invasion. In requesting autonomy to make his own plans, George gained approval from General Arnold and from General Leonard T. Gerow, head of the overworked WPD, who approved as long as AWPD held to the guidelines of ABC-1 and Rainbow 5.

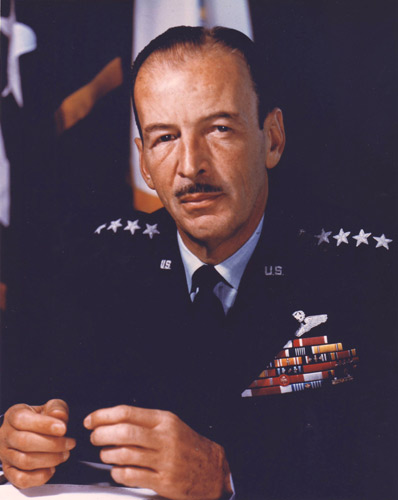
Laurence S. Kuter

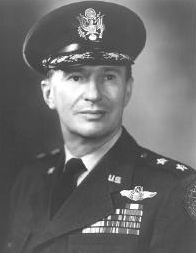
Haywood S. Hansell

George sought out men he knew were bombing advocates. He obtained temporary help from five more air officers: Lieutenant Colonels Max F. Schneider and Arthur W. Vanaman, and Majors Hoyt S. Vandenberg, Laurence S. Kuter, and Samuel E. Anderson. All but Samuel E. Anderson had passed through ACTS, where precision bombing theories were ascendant. Orvil Anderson was assigned to continue with ongoing projects while the rest of the men concentrated on the new request. On 4 August 1941, the augmented AWPD set to work.

George, Walker, Kuter, and Hansell provided the key concepts for the AWPD task force. George's vision was that the plan should not be a simple list of quantities of men and materiel—it should be a clear expression of the strategic direction required to win the war by use of air power. The main feature of the plan was the proposal to use massive fleets of heavy bombers to attack economic targets, the choke points of Axis industry. Hansell, fresh from a fact-finding mission to England in which he was briefed on British appreciations of German industrial and military targets, immediately became immersed in the job of target selection.

Munitions Requirements of the Army Air Forces to Defeat Our Potential Enemies, or AWPD-1, standing for "Air War Plans Division, plan number one", was the first concrete result of AWPD; it was delivered on 12 August after nine days of preparation. The plan used industrial web theory to describe how air power could be used to attack vulnerable nodes in Germany's economy, including electrical power systems, transportation networks, and oil and petroleum resources. The civil population of Berlin could be targeted as a final step to achieving enemy capitulation, but such an attack was optional: "No special bombardment unit [would be] set up for this purpose."

The plan also described, in less detail, how to use air power to draw a defensive perimeter around the Western Hemisphere and around America's interests in Alaska, Hawaii, the Dutch East Indies and the Philippines in the Pacific Ocean. In the Atlantic, AWPD indicated bases be developed in Iceland, Newfoundland, and Greenland to augment bases in the United Kingdom. Elsewhere, bases were to be established in India and staging areas arranged in Siberia.

Finally, the plan detailed large tactical air formations to assist in an invasion of Europe and to fight in the land campaigns to follow, to be ready by Spring 1944—the same time that invasion forces would be ready.

Army Chief of Staff General George Marshall approved AWPD-1 in September, as did Secretary of War Stimson. Army planners were worried that both the Soviet Union and the United Kingdom would be defeated, and that an invasion of Europe would become remote. The strategy of weakening Germany by bombing, long before an invasion could be prepared, gave hope that America would not lose any allies in the interim.

== AWPD-2 ==
On 9 September 1941, the president asked for more detail regarding allocation of aircraft based on estimates of peacetime production for the next nine months. In AWPD-2, Arnold and George designated two-thirds of the aircraft to be pooled for anti-Axis purposes such as Lend-Lease and one-third to be sent to the USAAF.

== Public knowledge ==
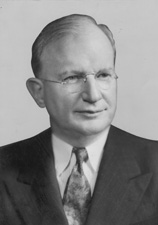
Senator Burton K. Wheeler compromised the secret plans in his wish to keep America out of the war.

Roosevelt incorporated the Army's, Navy's and Air Staff's detailed plans into an executive policy he called his "Victory Program". Roosevelt hoped to engage public opinion in favor of the Victory Program because the increase in production it promised meant more jobs and a healthier economy. Opponents of the policy included a powerful supporter of the isolationist America First Committee, Senator Burton K. Wheeler. Wheeler obtained a copy of the Victory Program, classified Secret, from a source within the Air Corps, and on 4 December 1941 leaked the plan to two isolationist newspapers, the Chicago Tribune and the Washington Times-Herald. Vocal public opposition to the plan ceased three days later on 7 December, when the Japanese attacked Pearl Harbor. Congress soon passed the Victory Program with few changes.

German agents monitoring American newspapers wired the compromised secret program to Berlin where Franz Halder, Chief of the German General Staff, realized its critical importance. On 12 December, Adolf Hitler issued Directive 39 which countered the American strategic bombing and invasion plans by massing air defenses around key industries and by greatly increasing Atlantic Ocean attacks so that an Allied invasion fleet could not be formed. Hitler directed his forces opposing the Soviet Union to go on the defensive so that they could hold their ground at least cost. Four days later, after visiting the Eastern Front and seeing the extent of his strategic failures there, Hitler "angrily and irrationally rescinded Directive 39" and focused his armies once again on the attack.

== AWPD-4 ==
After 7 December, all of America's former plans required revision—none had projected such early involvement in direct combat. Orvil Anderson was asked to rewrite the air plans. On 15 December, Anderson submitted AWPD-4, mostly a restatement of the goals of AWPD-1, but with augmented quantities to meet the greater needs of a two-front war. The number of combat aircraft was increased by 65%, and total aircraft production was more than doubled.

== AWPD-42 ==
On 24 August 1942, in light of the grim global situation, President Roosevelt called for a major reassessment of U.S. air power requirements, "in order to have complete air ascendancy over the enemy." The Japanese had expanded quickly in the Pacific Theater, North Africa was being rolled up by Rommel with Egypt threatened, Soviet forces were falling back against the German advances toward Stalingrad and the oilfields of the Caucasus, and German U-boats in the Atlantic sank 589 ships in early 1942. On 25 August, Arnold received word of the president's request from Army Chief of Staff George Marshall. The individual AWPD-1 team members had been reassigned to a wide variety of posts and duties, so to perform the reassessment Arnold recommended Hansell, recently made brigadier general. Marshall cabled Hansell in the UK, where he had been working under General Dwight D. Eisenhower as Air Planner, and under General Carl Andrew Spaatz as Deputy Theater Air Officer. Marshall ordered Hansell to hurry back to AWPD and that "the results of the work of this group are of such far-reaching importance that it will probably determine whether or not we control the air." Hansell brought with him VIII Bomber Command Chief of Intelligence Colonel Harris Hull and RAF Group Captain Bobby Sharp, as well as the little data compiled from five UK-based raids which had been flown by U.S. bombers. Hansell was assisted on a consultative basis by George, Kuter and Walker, old AWPD-1 hands, and by Lieutenant Colonel Malcolm Moss, who was a sharp businessman in civil life. The team had just 11 days to finish the work. Arnold was more closely involved than before in leading the group and formulating the new plan. Like AWPD-1, the new framework was based largely on untried bombing theory. The report, entitled Requirements for Air Ascendancy, 1942, or AWPD-42, was submitted to the Joint Chiefs of Staff (JCS) on 6 September 1942. Harry Hopkins had obtained his copy at 1 am the day it was to be released, and Hopkins read it in time to tell Roosevelt over breakfast that the plan was sound. Roosevelt called Stimson to say he approved it, but Stimson hadn't had not seen it; nor had Marshall when Stimson called him. Hansell left hurriedly for England so that he would not have to face Marshall's anger at being caught unprepared.

AWPD-42 was written under the assumption that the Soviet Union would be knocked out of the war, and that German forces in the East would then be brought to bear against the West. The plan thus assumed that German ground forces defending Europe would be numerically superior to Allied invasion forces, making invasion extremely costly and perhaps impossible. It was also assumed that two-front tension in the German economy would lessen, and Allied damage to Axis industry would be more easily absorbed. An increase in American air power was projected as the best way to reduce Axis industrial might. An air campaign against two major European objectives was encompassed: first to paralyze Axis industrial power, and second to defeat Axis air power. Axis aircraft factories and aircraft engine plants were to be targeted during 1943–1944 so that, in the spring of 1944, an invasion of Europe could be undertaken.

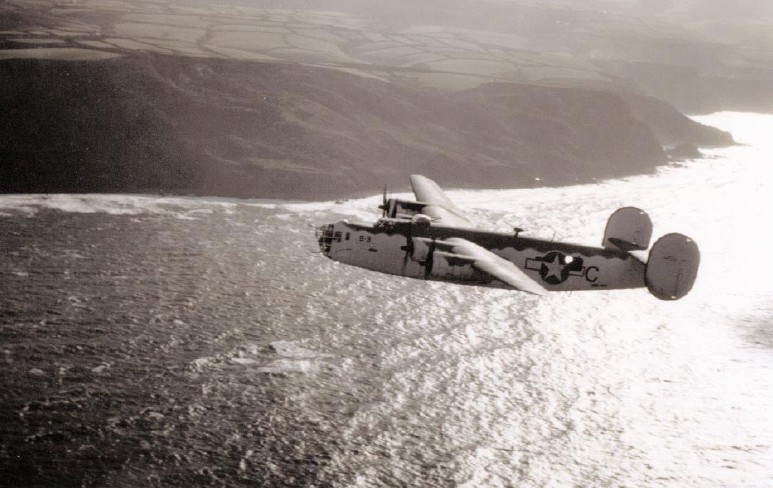
A U.S. Navy patrol bomber in 1943: the PB4Y-1 Liberator. Under AWPB-42, the aircraft would have been flown by Army Air Forces, not the Navy.

In the president's request, he had not asked for the combined numbers of U.S. Army and U.S. Navy aircraft; he asked for the "number of combat aircraft by types which should be produced in this country for the Army and our Allies in 1943..." This meant that the Navy's aircraft needs, which were significant, were not requested, but that the aircraft needs for America's allies would be included, allies that were to receive a certain number of Navy-type aircraft. Hansell decided to make his plan wholly inclusive of all American aircraft requirements—Army, Navy, and Allied—so that there would be no misunderstanding about how aircraft-producing resources would be allocated. Hansell accepted the aircraft production plans that the Navy submitted, but with one vital change: the four-engined bombers the Navy wanted would be built as Air Corps bombers, flown by USAAF units.

The Navy was not at all satisfied with AWPD-42. The Navy's intention to divert 1250 land-based heavy bombers from AAF requirements, to use for long-range patrol and for attacking enemy vessels, was dismissed in favor of USAAF flights to achieve the same goals. The Navy expected that command and control differences between the services, as well as differing targeting preferences, would create impossible barriers to successful employment of the notional USAAF patrol bombers against enemy naval forces. The Navy flatly rejected AWPD-42, which barred acceptance by the JCS, but by 15 October 1942 the president had established it as the U.S.'s aircraft manufacturing plan, saying that the lofty aircraft production proposal "will be given the highest priority and whatever preference is needed to insure its accomplishment."

== Quantities ==
AWPD-1 called for the production of 61,800 aircraft, of which 37,000 would be trainers and 11,800 would be for combat. The remaining 13,000 would be military transport aircraft and other types. Of the combat aircraft, 5000 were to be heavy and very heavy bombers. AWPD-4 increased the combat aircraft to 19,520 and the total to 146,000. Numbers increased again in AWPD-42, which proposed that combat aircraft should top 63,000 in 1943. Total U.S. aircraft production, including for the Navy, was set at 139,000 until it was realized that the goal could not be reached by American industry. 107,000 was instead proposed.

AWPD-1 projected a force of 2.1 million airmen. AWPD-42 increased this to 2.7 million.

In drawing up AWPD-1, George had predicted that two very heavy bombers that were on the drawing board, the Boeing B-29 Superfortress and the Consolidated-Vultee B-36, would be ready in time to take part in the attack on Germany. Delays in both programs kept them from consideration in Europe. In AWPD-42, the B-29 was shifted to attacks on Japan, and the B-36 development at Consolidated-Vultee was slowed in favor of manufacturing more B-24 Liberators. The extra-long range of the B-36 would not be needed now that the United Kingdom appeared secure from attack.

== Targets ==
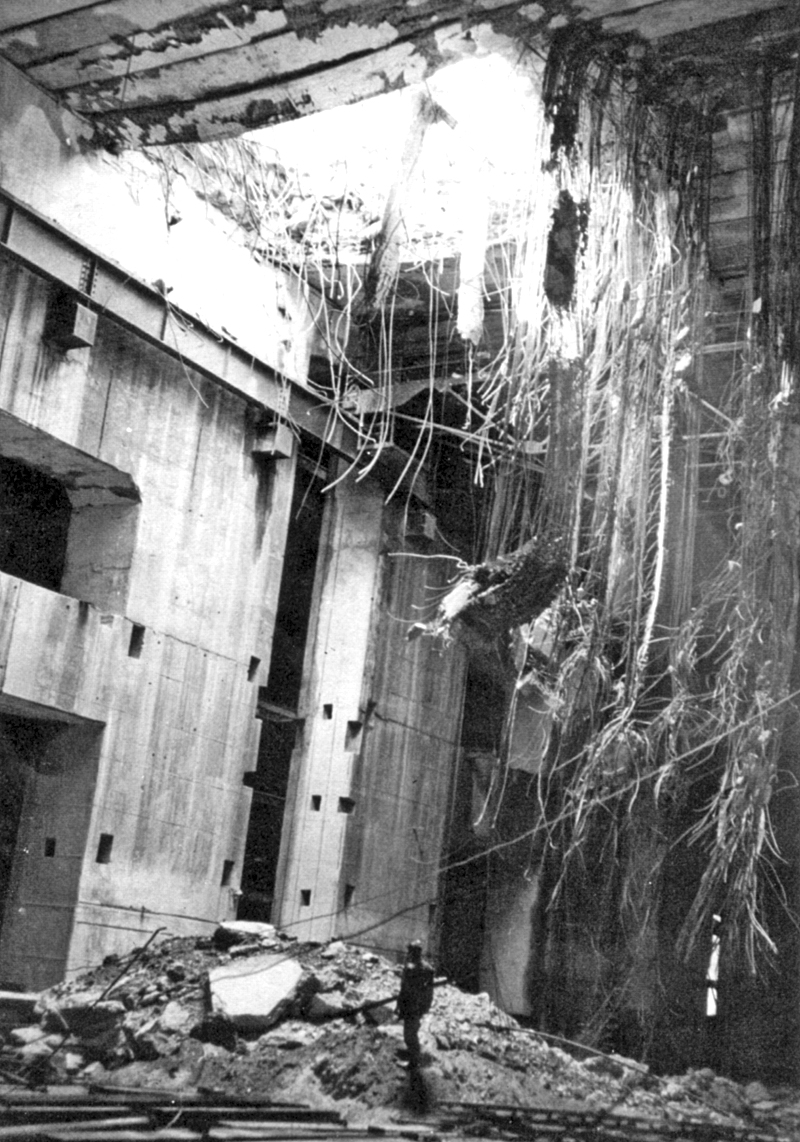
The interior of a submarine pen hit by an Allied Grand Slam bomb

AWPD-1 identified 154 targets in four areas of concern: electric power, transportation, petroleum and the Luftwaffe, the German Air Force. An arbitrary time frame was given, suggesting that six months after the strategic bombing forces were ready for large-scale attacks, the enemy targets would be destroyed.

AWPD-42 called for 177 targets to be hit, covering seven strategic areas, with the highest priority being enemy aircraft production. Other priorities were submarine pens and building yards, transportation systems, electric power generation and distribution, the petroleum industry, aluminum refining and manufacture, and the synthetic rubber industry. Hansell considered it a mistake to remove electricity from the top priority, and worse still to place submarine pens there. Political expediency dictated the shift in target priorities, not pure strategic considerations.

== Subsequent groups ==
Targeting proved a difficult task for AWPD—attaining the proper selection required a wide range of intelligence input as well as operational considerations. In December 1942, Arnold set up the Committee of Operations Analysts (COA) to better study the problem. The COA performed target selection for the USAAF.

In January 1943 at the Casablanca Conference, the Combined Chiefs of Staff agreed to begin the Combined Bomber Offensive (CBO) in June and set targeting priorities. Based on these priorities but with some changes, the British Air Ministry issued the Casablanca directive on 4 February, targeting the German military, German industrial and economic systems, and German morale. More methodically, USAAF General Ira C. Eaker assembled an Anglo-American planning team to take the COA's list of targets and schedule them for combined bomber operations. This unnamed group, sometimes called the CBO Planning Team, was led by Hansell and included among others USAAF Brigadier General Franklin Anderson and RAF Air Commodore Sidney Osborne Bufton. Finished in April 1943, the plan recommended 18 operations during each three-month phase against a total of 76 specific targets. The Combined Bomber Offensive began on 10 June 1943.

In late 1944, the COA was superseded by the Joint Target Group, a combined service unit organized by the JCS.
