= Operation San Antonio =

Air attacks on Japan during World War II

- Part of Pacific theatre of World War II
- Location: Tokyo, Japan
- Planned: Originally scheduled for 17 November 1944; bad weather on Saipan postponed execution to 24 November 1944
- Target: Musashino A/C Plant Tokyo ( 357), Secondary - urban and dock areas of Tokyo
- Objective: Destroy or seriously damage Japanese aircraft-engine production
- Date: 24 November 1944 (UTC+09:00)

During World War II, Operation San Antonio was the name used for a number of air attacks launched by United States Army Air Forces B-29s flying from bases on Guam to targets in the Tokyo area.

"San Antonio 1", on 24 November 1944, was the first B-29 attack on the Japanese capital. Of the 110 Superfortresses that left the base, 17 had to abort due to technical reasons, only two dozen bombers found the Musashino aircraft factory, their primary target. The mission was plagued with very high jet stream winds and about 125 defending fighters.
