= Richard H. Carmichael =

United States Air Force general

Richard Henry Carmichael
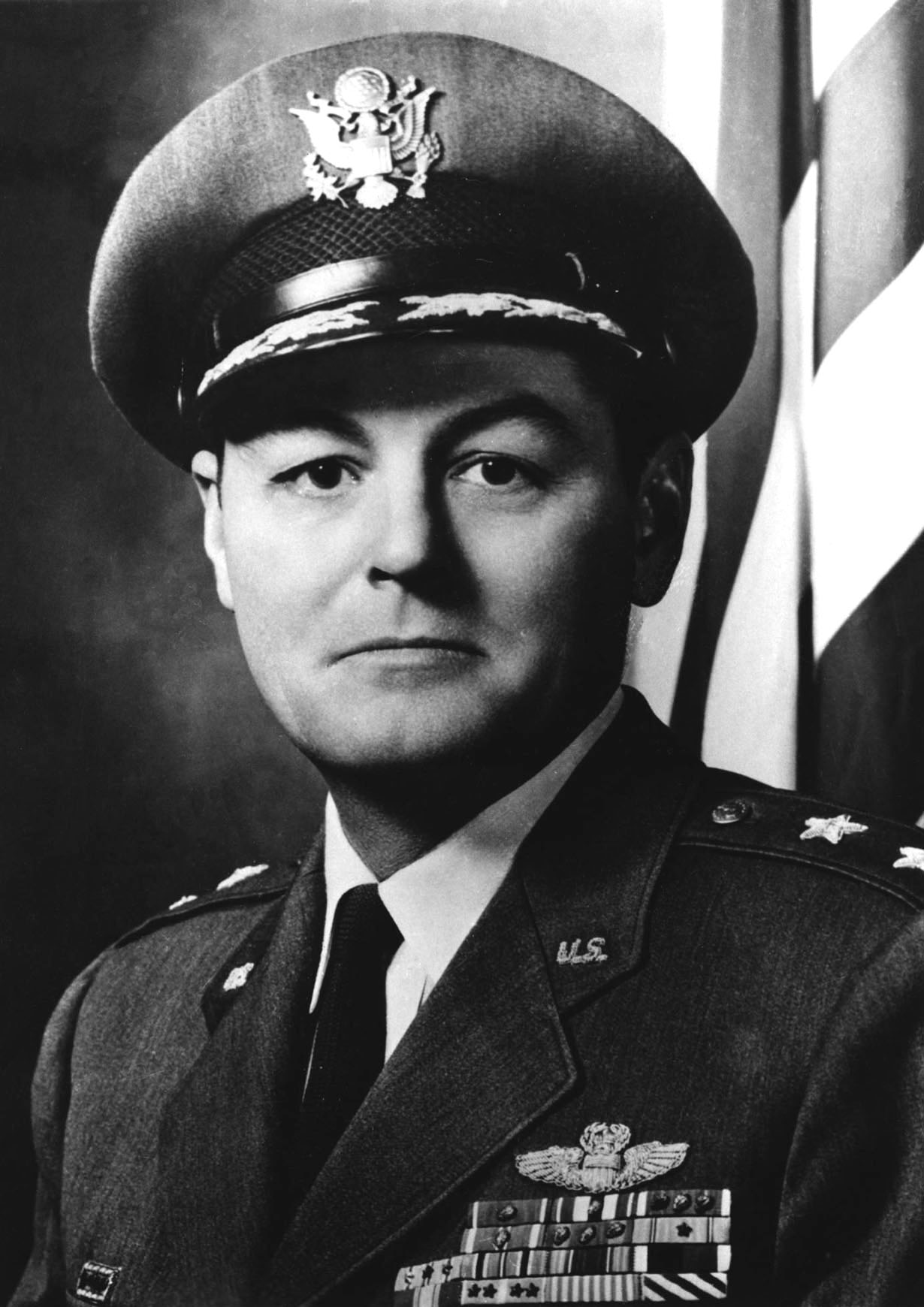
- Major General Richard Henry Carmichael
- Born: 13 April 1913; Hillsboro, Texas
- Died: 14 April 1983 (aged 70); Bethesda, Maryland
- Burial place: Arlington National Cemetery
- Military career
- Allegiance: United States
- Branch: United States Army Air Corps; United States Air Force
- Service years: 1936–1961
- Rank: Major general
- Service number: 0-20203
- Commands: 9th Bomb Squadron; 88th Reconnaissance Squadron; 19th Bombardment Group; 462nd Bombardment Group; 11th Bombardment Group; 98th Bombardment Group; 14th Air Division; Far East Air Forces Bomber Command; 21st Air Division; Air Command and Staff College
- Conflicts: World War II: Attack on Pearl Harbor; Bombing of Rabaul (1942); China Burma India Theater; Air raids on Japan; Korean War
- Awards: Distinguished Service Cross (2); Silver Star (2); Legion of Merit (5); Distinguished Flying Cross (2); Air Medal (4); Distinguished Flying Cross (United Kingdom)

Richard Henry Carmichael (11 April 1913 – 14 April 1983) was a general officer in the United States Air Force and a highly decorated bomber pilot. He twice received the Distinguished Service Cross. Carmichael piloted the first B-29 Superfortress to be shot down over Japan in World War II, while leading the 462d Bombardment Group in the bombing of Yawata on 20 August 1944, the first daylight air raid on Japan since the Doolittle Raid in 1942. He remained a prisoner of war until he was liberated on 29 August 1945. During the Korean War, he flew another 39 combat missions as commander of the 98th Bombardment Group. He was commandant of the Air Command and Staff College, before he retired from the Air Force on 19 January 1961.

== Early life ==
Carmichael was born in Hillsboro, Texas, on 11 April 1913, the son of Horace and Fay Carmichael. He graduated from Main Avenue High School in 1930, and then the West Point Preparatory School at Fort Sam Houston, Texas. He won a competitive appointment to the United States Military Academy in West Point, New York, through the Texas National Guard. He entered West Point on 1 July 1932. He graduated 92nd out of 278 in the class of 1936 on 12 June 1936, and was commissioned as a second lieutenant in the Field Artillery. On 12 September 1936 he reported to the Air Corps Training Center at Randolph Field, near San Antonio, Texas, where he received flight training. He transferred to the United States Army Air Corps on 1 October 1937. Before departing to his first assignment, in the Territory of Hawaii, he returned to New York, and married Muriel Edith Wright, to whom he had become engaged when he was a cadet. They had four sons. From 20 November 1937, to 13 March 1939, he was the Armament Officer and Supply Officer of the 6th Pursuit Squadron, which was based at Wheeler Field in Hawaii. He was promoted to first lieutenant on 12 June 1939.

== World War II ==
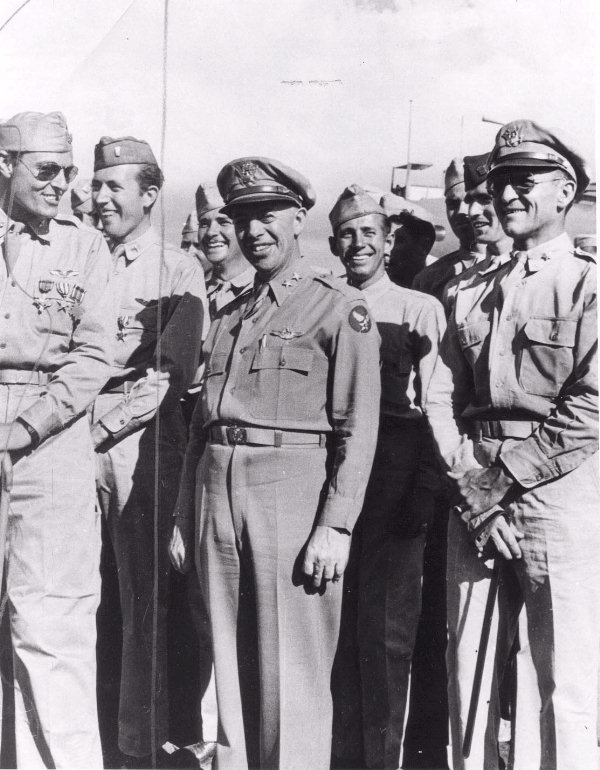
Carmichael (left) with commanding officer of the Fifth Air Force General George Kenney (center) and commanding general of V Bomber Command General Kenneth Walker, at Port Moresby, New Guinea (1942)

Carmichael commanded the 9th Bombardment Squadron of the 7th Bombardment Group from September 1940 to December 1941. He was promoted to captain in the Army of the United States on 9 September 1940, and major on 15 November 1941. He then became commander of the 88th Reconnaissance Squadron. His Boeing B-17 Flying Fortresses departed for the Philippines, but on reaching Hawaii found Hickam Field under attack by the Japanese. He landed his plane at the Haleiwa Fighter Strip. He was awarded the Distinguished Flying Cross. The 88th Reconnaissance Squadron did not proceed to the Philippines, but moved to Australia in February 1942. There, Carmichael become commander of the newly formed 40th Reconnaissance Squadron. As such, he despatched the B-17s that effected Douglas MacArthur's escape from the Philippines in March 1942.

Carmichael was awarded the Silver Star for a night raid on Rabaul on 23 February 1942. A dozen B-17s were flown to Cloncurry for the mission, the first raid on Rabaul, but without ground crews, the aircrew had to perform their own maintenance, and three bombers could not be made ready due to mechanical problems. The RAAF made available two experienced PBY Catalina pilots to help with navigation, Wing Commander Julius Cohen, and Pilot Officer Norman Robertson, since there were no navigation aids or reliable charts. The bombers flew to Garbutt Field in Townsville, where one bomber's engine refused to run, and two collided in the darkness, reducing the number of aircraft in the mission to six. Severe weather conditions were encountered which caused one bomber to turn back. The rest reached the target area only to find it obscured by low clouds and volcanic steam. They dropped their bombs and were attacked by fighters. Carmichael's bomber was riddled with bullet holes, and the radio operator and tail gunner were lightly wounded, but all were able to return to Port Moresby, and thence back to Townsville. The results were officially recorded as "unobserved", but Carmichael did not believe that they hit anything.

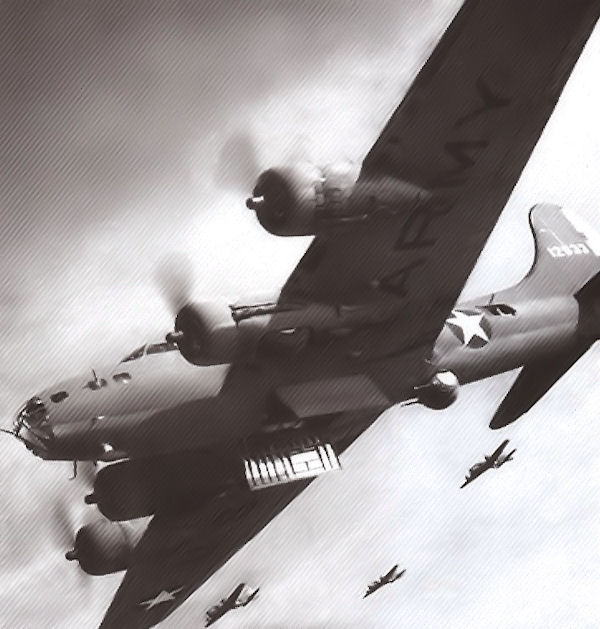
19th Bombardment Group B-17s

Promoted to lieutenant colonel on 1 March 1942, Carmichael was director of bombing at Allied Air Forces, Southwest Pacific Area from 26 March 1942 until 7 July 1942, when he became commander of the 19th Bombardment Group. He was awarded the Distinguished Service Cross for another raid on Rabaul on 7 August 1942. This time the commander of the Allied Air Forces, Major General George Kenney, wanted a maximum effort to support the landing on Guadalcanal. He was hoping for twenty aircraft, but only 16 were operational. One bomber cracked up on takeoff from Port Moresby at 07:30, and two more had to abort with electrical or mechanical problems. The remaining thirteen bombed the target. They were then jumped by fifteen Japanese fighters. Both Carmichael's side gunners were killed, and his airplane was heavily damaged by hostile fire. The oxygen system was knocked out, forcing him to descend to low level. One bomber, flown by Captain Harl Pease, was shot down. Kenney nominated Pease, who was later executed by the Japanese, for the Medal of Honor. Kenney was pleased with the results of the raid; he believed, and wrote in this post-war account, that as many as 120 Japanese aircraft might have been destroyed. In fact, damage to the target airfield was superficial, not a single Japanese plane was lost on the ground, and not one fighter was shot down, although a dozen were damaged.

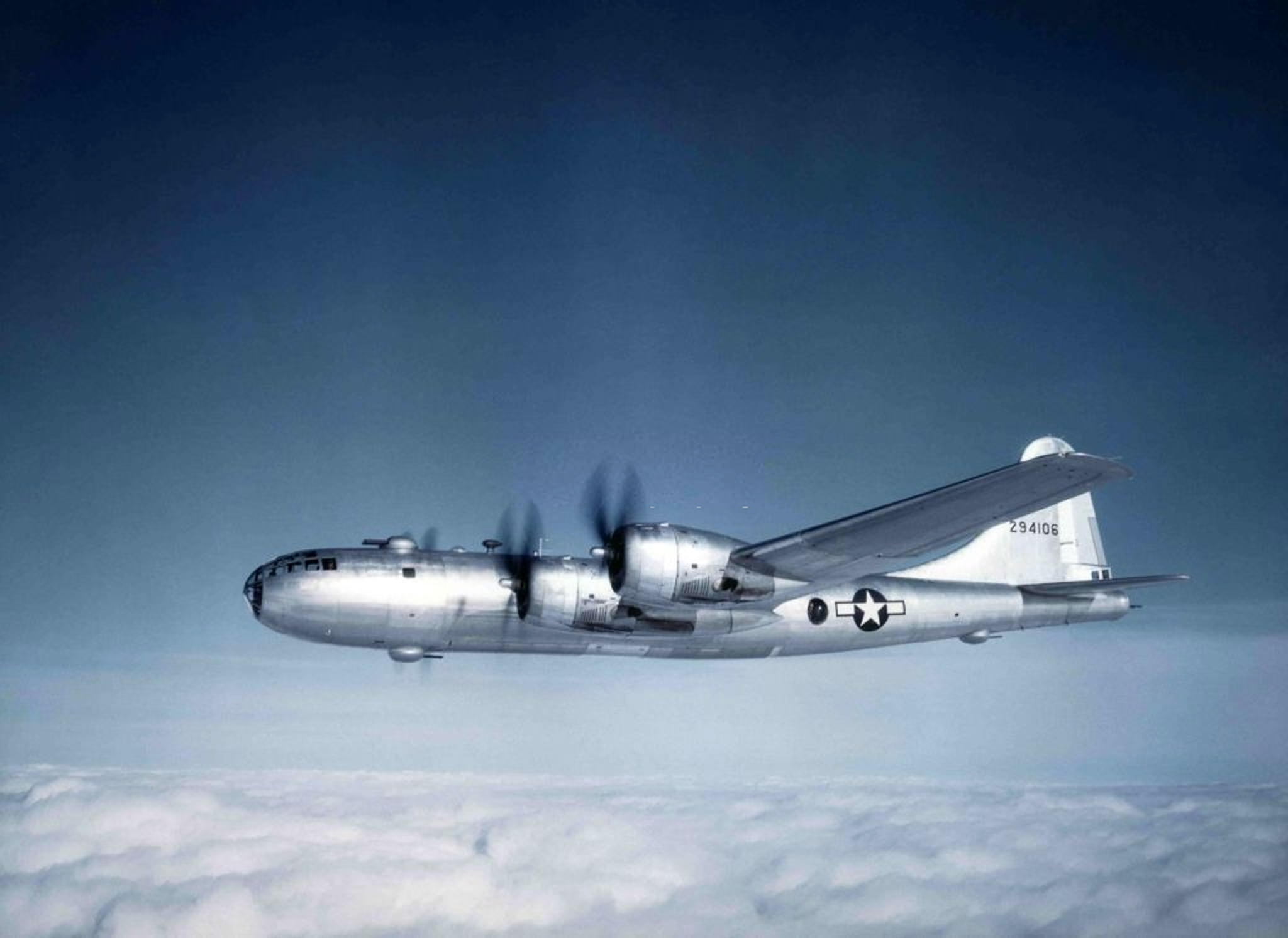
B-29 Superfortress

The 19th Bombardment Group returned to the United States in late 1942. Carmichael served on the staff of United States Army Air Forces in Washington, D.C., as executive assistant to General Henry H. Arnold from 6 January to 26 July 1943, for which he was award the Legion of Merit. On 26 August 1943, he became commander of the 462d Bombardment Group, flying the Boeing B-29 Superfortress from Walker Army Airfield in Kansas. The 462d Bombardment Group flew to the China Burma India Theater via Africa between March and June 1944, where it became part of the Twentieth Air Force. On 20 August he was shot down over Japan. He was awarded an oak leaf cluster to his Distinguished Service Cross:

for extraordinary heroism in connection with military operations against an armed enemy while serving as Pilot of a B-29 Very Heavy Bomber of the 58th Bombardment Wing, Twentieth Air Force, while participating in a bombing mission on 20 August 1944, against enemy ground targets in Japan. Colonel Carmichael was Formation Commander of three B-29 aircraft on a precision daylight attack from a forward base in China against the coke ovens of the Imperial Iron and Steel Works at Yawata, Japan. Twenty minutes before the start of the bomb run, the formation was attacked by 35 to 50 enemy interceptors utilizing phosphorus aerial bombs and ramming tactics, and continuing throughout the bomb run. Disregarding fighters and the increasingly heavy and accurate anti-aircraft fire, Colonel Carmichael kept his formation together and continued on the strike. In turning away, Colonel Carmichael's plane was hit by an aerial bomb in the middle wing section, putting the two starboard engines out of commission, setting several fires along the wings, and injuring two crew members. The plane went into a steep, slow diving spin with Colonel Carmichael fighting to regain control. He checked the descent long enough for seven crew members to parachute to safety. Colonel Carmichael was determined to attempt to land the plane because of the two injured men who were unable to bail out, but at about 500 feet the entire right wing burned through and dropped off. He saw that he had done all that was humanly possible to save the lives of the two remaining men and, realizing the futility of remaining with his crippled bomber, parachuted to the ground. This mission, the first daylight strike against the home islands of Japan since the Tokyo raid of 1942, completely destroyed the vital enemy iron and steel works. It proved the real effectiveness of daylight precision bombing by B-29s. Colonel Carmichael's actions, in the face of fighter and flak opposition and the hazards of mechanical failure on this mission of more than 3,000 miles, reflect great credit on himself and are in keeping with the highest traditions of the Army Air Forces.

He was also awarded the Distinguished Flying Cross and Legion of Merit for his command of the 462d Bombardment Group.

== Later life ==
Carmichael was a prisoner of war until he was liberated on 29 August 1945, after the surrender of Japan. After repatriation and a period of hospitalization, he was posted to the Air Materiel Command at Wright Field in Ohio from 8 February to 30 August 1946. He attended the Air Command and Staff School. Upon graduation, he was assigned to the staff of the Air University as chief of the Air Power Employment Branch, Evaluation Division on 7 July 1947. Having reverted to his permanent rank of captain in the Air Corps on 12 June 1946, he was promoted to lieutenant colonel in the new United States Air Force on 1 July 1948.

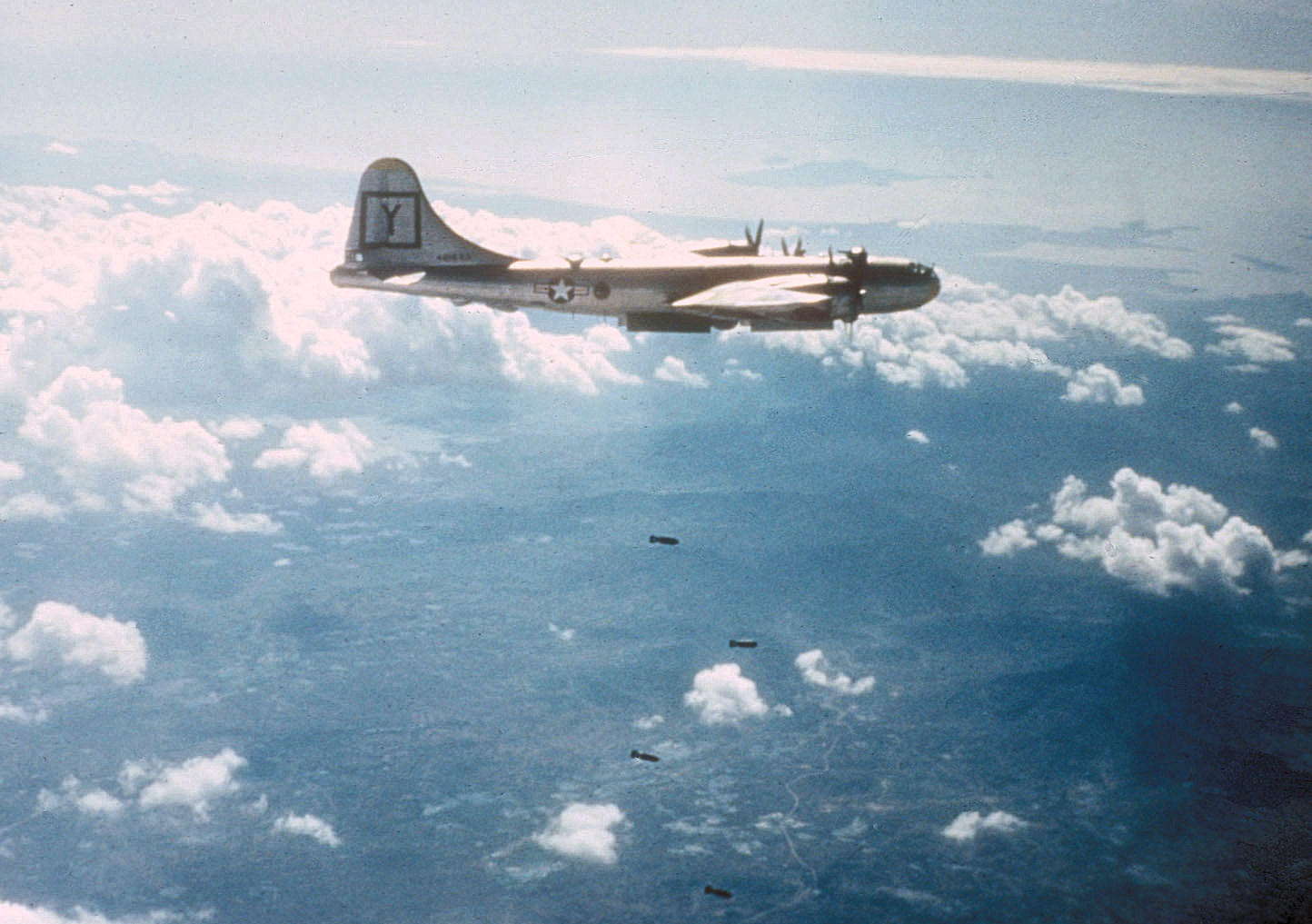
B-29 Superfortress over Korea (1951)

On 1 July 1949, he assumed command of the 11th Bombardment Group at Carswell Air Force Base near Fort Worth, Texas. On 1 April 1950, he became commander of the 98th Bombardment Group at Spokane Army Airfield in Washington state. The 98th Bombardment Group moved to Yokota Air Base in Japan in August 1950 to participate in the Korean War, and he flew another 39 combat missions in Korea. He was awarded another oak leaf cluster to his Legion of Merit, and one to his Silver Star for leading a bombing raid on Sinuiju, the temporary capital of North Korea, on 8 November 1950. An important supply and communications center, it lay only 666 yards (609 m) from Andong, a Chinese city on the other side of the Yalu River. This restricted the approaches to the city, which were covered by anti-aircraft guns. In view of the danger of a border incursion into Manchuria, Carmichael led the mission.

Returning to the United States, he became commander of the 93d Bombardment Wing on 16 April 1951. In October 1951, he was reassigned to Travis Air Force Base in California as commander 14th Air Division. He was promoted to brigadier general on 8 March 1952. In May 1953 he returned to the Far East as commander of the Far East Air Force Bomber Command from 15 June to 27 July 1953, for which he was awarded a third oak leaf cluster to his Legion of Merit. At this stage, the Korean War was in its final throes. The Chinese had begun concentrating large numbers of aircraft in the Andong area, and it was feared that if the airfields in North Korea were not kept out of action they would be deployed to North Korea. Since the proposed Korean Armistice Agreement permitted a retention of the status quo of forces in North Korea, this might allow the creation of a large air force in North Korea in the last weeks of the war, which would then become a permanent feature. To prevent this, Carmichael instituted a program of keeping the airfields unusable, using nightly attacks by his medium bombers on airfields and installations at Uiju, Sinuiju, Samchan, Taechon, Pyongyong and Pyong Ni. This was conducted in the face of an intense enemy rebuilding effort, and in the teeth of anti-aircraft artillery and jet interceptors, but he was still able to keep the airfield non-operational, and no aircraft were shot down or aircrew lost. The last mission was flown just ten hours before the armistice came into effect.

After this, Carmichael returned to Headquarters U.S. Air Force in Washington, D.C., as the deputy director, and then the director, of personnel procurement and training from 16 May 1954 to 11 July 1958. With the Korean War over, he was able to concentrate on the Air Force's longer-term requirements. These included absorbing reserve officers into the regular Air Force; the development of re-enlistment programs for both officers and enlisted men to boost their retention in the Air Force; the creation of re-training programs; and the establishment of selection criteria for cadets at the new United States Air Force Academy. For this he was awarded a fourth oak leaf cluster to his Legion of Merit. On 11 July 1958 Carmichael took up his final posting, as the commandant of the Air University's Air Command and Staff College. He retired from the Air Force on 19 January 1961.

Carmichael died in Washington, D.C., on 14 April 1983, and was buried in Arlington National Cemetery.

== Awards and decorations ==

US Air Force Command Pilot Badge
Distinguished Service Cross with bronze oak leaf cluster
Silver Star with bronze oak leaf cluster	Legion of Merit with four bronze oak leaf clusters	Distinguished Flying Cross with bronze oak leaf cluster
Air Medal with three bronze oak leaf clusters	Air Force Presidential Unit Citation with four bronze oak leaf clusters	Prisoner of War Medal
American Defense Service Medal with bronze service star	American Campaign Medal	Asiatic–Pacific Campaign Medal with one silver and two bronze campaign stars
World War II Victory Medal	Army of Occupation Medal with 'Japan' clasp	National Defense Service Medal with bronze service star
Korean Service Medal with four bronze campaign stars	Air Force Longevity Service Award with silver oak leaf cluster	Distinguished Flying Cross (United Kingdom)
Republic of Korea Presidential Unit Citation (Republic of Korea)	United Nations Korea Medal (United Nations)	Korean War Service Medal (Republic of Korea)

=== First Distinguished Service Cross citation ===

Carmichael, Richard H.
Lieutenant Colonel (Air Corps), U.S. Army Air Forces
19th Bombardment Group (H), Fifth Air Force
Date of Action: 7 August 1942

Citation:

The President of the United States of America, authorized by Act of Congress 9 July 1918, takes pleasure in presenting the Distinguished Service Cross to Lieutenant Colonel (Air Corps) Richard Henry Carmichael, United States Army Air Forces, for extraordinary heroism in connection with military operations against an armed enemy while serving as Pilot of a B-17 Heavy Bomber and Commander of the 19th Bombardment Group (H), Fifth Air Force, in action over Rabaul, New Britain, on 7 August 1942. When the interdiction of hostile bombardment operations from the Rabaul area became of primary importance, Lieutenant Colonel Carmichael personally led all available airplanes of his group in an attack against the enemy airdrome at Vunakanau, Rabaul. Without the protection of fighter airplanes, the formation was intercepted by enemy fighters. Although both his side gunners were killed and his airplane was heavily damaged by hostile fire, he continued to press home the attack. His courageous and effective leadership of his group resulted in the shooting down of eleven enemy fighters and in the destruction of, or severe damage to, approximately fifty enemy bombers on the ground. The personal courage and zealous devotion to duty displayed by Lieutenant Colonel Carmichael on this occasion have upheld the highest traditions of the military service and reflect great credit upon himself, the Fifth Air Force, and the United States Army Air Forces.

=== Second Distinguished Service Cross citation ===

Carmichael, Richard H.
Colonel (Air Corps), U.S. Army Air Forces
58th Bombardment Wing, Twentieth Air Force
Date of Action: 20 August 1944

Citation:

The President of the United States of America, authorized by Act of Congress 9 July 1918, takes pleasure in presenting a Bronze Oak Leaf Cluster in lieu of a Second Award of the Distinguished Service Cross to Colonel (Air Corps) Richard Henry Carmichael, United States Army Air Forces, for extraordinary heroism in connection with military operations against an armed enemy while serving as Pilot of a B-29 Very Heavy Bomber of the 58th Bombardment Wing, Twentieth Air Force, while participating in a bombing mission on 20 August 1944, against enemy ground targets in Japan. Colonel Carmichael was Formation Commander of three B-29 aircraft on a precision daylight attack from a forward base in China against the coke ovens of the Imperial Iron and Steel Works at Yawata, Japan. Twenty minutes before the start of the bomb run, the formation was attacked by 35 to 50 enemy interceptors utilizing phosphorus aerial bombs and ramming tactics, and continuing throughout the bomb run. Disregarding fighters and the increasingly heavy and accurate anti-aircraft fire, Colonel Carmichael kept his formation together and continued on the strike. In turning away, Colonel Carmichael's plane was hit by an aerial bomb in the middle wing section, putting the two starboard engines out of commission, setting several fires along the wings, and injuring two crew members. The plane went into a steep, slow diving spin with Colonel Carmichael fighting to regain control. He checked the descent long enough for seven crew members to parachute to safety. Colonel Carmichael was determined to attempt to land the plane because of the two injured men who were unable to bail out, but at about 500 feet the entire right wing burned through and dropped off. He saw that he had done all that was humanly possible to save the lives of the two remaining men and, realizing the futility of remaining with his crippled bomber, parachuted to the ground. This mission, the first daylight strike against the home islands of Japan since the Tokyo raid of 1942, completely destroyed the vital enemy iron and steel works. It proved the real effectiveness of daylight precision bombing by B-29s. Colonel Carmichael's actions, in the face of fighter and flak opposition and the hazards of mechanical failure on this mission of more than 3,000 miles, reflect great credit on himself and are in keeping with the highest traditions of the Army Air Forces.

== Dates of rank ==
Insignia	Rank	Component	Date	Source
	Second lieutenant	Field Artillery	12 June 1936	
	Second lieutenant	Air Corps	1 October 1937	
	First lieutenant	Air Corps	12 June 1939	
	Captain	Army of the United States	9 September 1940	
	Major	Army of the United States	15 November 1941	
	Lieutenant colonel	Army of the United States	1 March 1942	
	Colonel	Army of the United States	15 December 1942	
	Captain	Air Corps	12 June 1946	
	Lieutenant colonel	United States Air Force	1 July 1948	
	Colonel	United States Air Force	27 July 1950	
	Brigadier general	United States Air Forces	8 March 1952	
	Major general	United States Air Force	1958	

LT. General 1960
