= List of West Alabama Tigers head football coaches =

The West Alabama Tigers college football team represents the University of West Alabama (Note: Since 1939, what is now known as the University of West Alabama has also been known as: Livingston State Teachers College (1939–1957), Livingston State College (1957–1967) and Livingston University (1967–1995).) in the Gulf South Conference (GSC). The Tigers compete as part of the National Collegiate Athletic Association (NCAA) NCAA Division II. The program has had 23 head coaches since it began play during the 1938 season. In February 2025, Scott Cochran was named as head coach after Brett Gilliland resigned to serve as athletic director at West Alabama.

The team has played nearly 700 games over 71 seasons of West Alabama football. In that time, five coaches have led the Tigers to postseason appearances: Morris Higginbotham, Mickey Andrews, Jim King, Bobby Wallace and Hall. Hall led the Tigers to their first outright Gulf South championship in 2012. Andrews won West Alabama's lone national championship in 1971 as a member of the National Association of Intercollegiate Athletics.

Gilliland is the leader in seasons coached with 11 years with the program and the leader in games won with 71 and Andrews has the highest winning percentage of those who have coached more than one game, with .750. Robert Cire has the lowest winning percentage of those who have coached more than one game, with .100. Will Hall led the Tigers to both of their GSC championships. Of the 22 head coaches who have led the Tigers, Vaughn Mancha has been inducted into the College Football Hall of Fame.

== Key ==
Key to symbols in coaches list
General		Overall		Conference		Postseason (Note: Although the first Rose Bowl Game was played in 1902, it has been continuously played since the 1916 game, and is recognized as the oldest bowl game by the NCAA. "—" indicates any season prior to 1916 when postseason games were not played.)	
No.	Order of coaches (Note: A running total of the number of head coaches, with coaches who served separate tenures being counted only once. Interim head coaches are represented with "Int" and are not counted in the running total. "—" indicates the team played but either without a coach or no coach is on record. "X" indicates an interim year without play.)	GC	Games coached	CW	Conference wins	PW	Postseason wins
DC	Division championships	OW	Overall wins	CL	Conference losses	PL	Postseason losses
CC	Conference championships	OL	Overall losses	CT	Conference ties	PT	Postseason ties
NC	National championships	OT	Overall ties (Note: Overtime rules in college football were introduced in 1996, making ties impossible in the period since.)	C%	Conference winning percentage		
†	Elected to the College Football Hall of Fame	O%	Overall winning percentage (Note: When computing the win–loss percentage, a tie counts as half a win and half a loss.)				

== Coaches ==
List of head football coaches showing season(s) coached, overall records, conference records, postseason records, championships and selected awards (Note: Statistics correct as of the end of the 2025 college football season.)
No.	Name	Term (Note: West Alabama did not field a team between 1942 and 1945 due to World War II.)	G	W	L	T	PCT	CW	CL	CT	PCT	PW	PL	PT	CCs	NCs	Awards
1	Paul Tubb	1938–1941	27	13	12	2	0.519	—	—	—	—	—	—	—	0	0	—
2	Fred McCollum	1946	6	4	2	0	0.667	—	—	—	—	—	—	—	0	0	—
3	C. A. Douglas	1947–1948	17	3	13	1	0.206	—	—	—	—	—	—	—	0	0	—
4	George Darrow	1949 (Note: George Darrow served as head coach for Livingston State for the first two games of the 1949 season before he died of a heart attack on September 25. Vaughn Mancha succeed him as head coach.)	2	1	1	0	0.500	1	0	0	1.000	—	—	—	0	0	—
5	Vaughn Mancha^{†}	1949–1951	28	17	19	2	0.643	—	—	—	—	—	—	—	1	0	—
6	Bob Williams	1952	10	4	6	0	0.400	—	—	—	—	—	—	—	0	0	—
7	T. Ray Richeson	1953–1956	36	4	31	1	0.125	—	—	—	—	—	—	—	0	0	—
8	Robert Cire	1957–1959	25	2	22	1	0.100	—	—	—	—	—	—	—	0	0	—
9	Jim Garner	1957–1959	64	22	39	3	0.367	—	—	—	—	—	—	—	0	0	—
10	Morris Higginbotham	1967–1969	30	19	9	2	0.667	—	—	—	—	0	1	0	0	0	—
11	Mickey Andrews	1970–1972	32	23	7	2	0.750	10	7	0	0.588	2	1	0	0	1 – 1971 (NAIA)	—
12	Jim King	1973–1976	44	29	14	1	0.670	20	11	1	0.641	1	1	0	0	0	—
13	Jack Crowe	1977–1978	20	5	15	0	0.250	2	13	0	0.133	0	0	0	0	0	—
14	Frank North	1979–1984	60	31	29	0	0.517	17	24	0	0.415	0	0	0	0	0	—
15	Sam McCorkle	1985–1990; 2004–2005	88	24	62	2	0.284	13	51	2	0.212	0	0	0	0	0	—
16	Lloyd Sisco	1991–1993	30	13	16	1	0.450	5	13	1	0.289	0	0	0	0	0	—
17	Todd Stroud	1994–1996	31	6	25	0	0.194	1	21	0	0.045	0	0	0	0	0	—
18	Bobby Johns	1997–2000	42	11	31	—	0.262	6	28	—	0.176	0	0	—	0	0	—
19	Randy Pippin	2001–2003	33	8	25	—	0.242	4	23	—	0.148	0	0	—	0	0	—
20	Bobby Wallace	2006–2010	56	26	30	—	0.464	15	25	—	0.375	1	1	—	0	0	—
21	Will Hall	2011–2013	36	25	11	—	0.694	11	3	—	0.786	1	2	—	2	0	—
22	Brett Gilliland	2014–2024	114	71	43	—	0.623	42	32	—	0.568	1	3	—	1	0	—
23	Scott Cochran	2025–present	9	5	4	—	0.556	0	3	—	.000	0	0	—	0	0	—
