= James Garner (disambiguation) =

James Garner (1928–2014) was an American film and television star.

James or Jim Garner may also refer to:

- James Garner (footballer, born 1895) (1895–1975), English footballer
- James Garner (footballer, born 2001), English footballer
- James Garner (cricketer) (born 1972), English cricketer
- James Garner (politician), 1988–2005 mayor of Hempstead, New York
- James Bert Garner (1870–1960), American chemist, and inventor of the gas mask
- James Finn Garner (born 1961), American comedy writer
- James Wilford Garner (1871–1938), American political writer
- James E. Garner, Sr., mayor of New Albany, Indiana
- James William Arthur Garner (born 1944), politician in Saskatchewan, Canada
- Jay Garner (born 1938), American military officer
- Jay Garner (actor) (1929–2011; born James Garner), American actor
- Jim Garner (American football), American football player (1949–1951) and coach (1960–1966) for Livingston State College
- Jim Garner (American politician) (born 1963), American politician and former Kansas Secretary of Labor
- Jim Garner (athletic director), American college athletics administrator

== See also ==
- James Gardner (disambiguation)
