= James Gardiner =

James Gardiner may refer to:

== Politicians ==
- James Gardiner (Australian politician) (1861–1928), Australian politician
- James Gardiner (British politician) (1860–1924), Scottish farmer and Liberal Party politician
- James Garfield Gardiner (1883–1962), Canadian politician
- James Wilfrid Gardiner (1924–2002), politician in Saskatchewan, Canada
- Jim Gardiner (Family Coalition Party), Ontario political candidate
- Jim Gardiner (Chicago politician), Chicago alderman

== Religious figures ==
- James Gardiner (bishop) (1637–1705), 18th-century bishop of Lincoln
- James Gardiner the Younger (1689–1732), Anglican sub-dean of Lincoln, England, writer and translator

== Military figures ==
- James Gardiner (British Army officer) (1688–1745), Scottish soldier
- James Daniel Gardner (1839–1905), also spelled Gardiner, 19th-century American soldier

== Other people ==
- Jim Gardiner (rower) (1930–2016), American rower at the 1956 Olympics
- James Henry Gardiner (1848–1921), Australian rules football administrator, footballer and public servant
- James Terry Gardiner, American surveyor and engineer
- James McDonald Gardiner, American architect, lay missionary and educator
- James Gardiner (rugby union), Irish international rugby union player

== See also ==
- James Gardner (disambiguation)
