= James Gardner =

James or Jim Gardner may refer to:

== Arts and entertainment ==
- Jim Gardner (broadcaster) (born 1948), stage name of James Goldman, American television broadcaster
- James Alan Gardner (born 1955), Canadian science fiction author
- James Gardner (musician) (born 1962), British musician and composer

== Business and industry ==
- James Gardner (surveyor) (fl. 1808–1840), British engineer
- James Terry Gardiner (1842–1912), American surveyor and engineer, used the Gardner spelling for part of his life
- Jim Gardner (trade unionist) (1893–1976), Scottish trade unionist
- James Gardner (designer) (1907–1995), British industrial designer
- James Alexander Gardner (born 1970), British innovation author and technologist

== Law and politics ==
- James Patrick Gardner (1883–1937), British politician, MP for Hammersmith North
- Jim Gardner (politician) (born 1933), American politician in North Carolina
- James Knoll Gardner (1940–2017), U.S. federal judge

== Science and medicine ==
- James Cardwell Gardner (1864–1935), English doctor and amateur rower
- James Clark Molesworth Gardner (1894–1970), British entomologist
- James N. Gardner (1946–2021), American complexity theorist and science essayist

== Others ==
- James Daniel Gardner (1839–1905), American Civil War Medal of Honor recipient
- Jim Gardner (baseball) (1874–1905), American baseball pitcher
- James A. Gardner (1943–1966), American army officer, Vietnam War Medal of Honor recipient

== See also ==
- James Gardiner (disambiguation)
- James Garner (disambiguation)
- Jimmy Gardner (disambiguation)
