= Bishop Gardiner =

Bishop Gardiner may refer to:

- Stephen Gardiner (1483–1555), English Catholic bishop and politician during the English Reformation
- James Gardiner (bishop) (1637–1705), English bishop of Lincoln
