= Cire =

Cire or CIRE may refer to:

== Education ==
- Chengdu Institute of Radio Engineering, the founding name of the University of Electronic Science and Technology of China in Chengdu, China.

== People ==
- Amadou Ciré Baal (born 1951), Senegalese sports shooter
- George Edward Cire (1922-1985), American judge
- Pape Ciré Dia (born 1980), Senegalese football player
- Robert Cire (1924–2009), American American football coach
- Samba Ciré (1898–?), French athlete

== Places ==
- Ciré-d'Aunis, France

== Other ==
- CIRE-TV, Canadian TV channel
