= 52nd Expeditionary Flying Training Squadron =

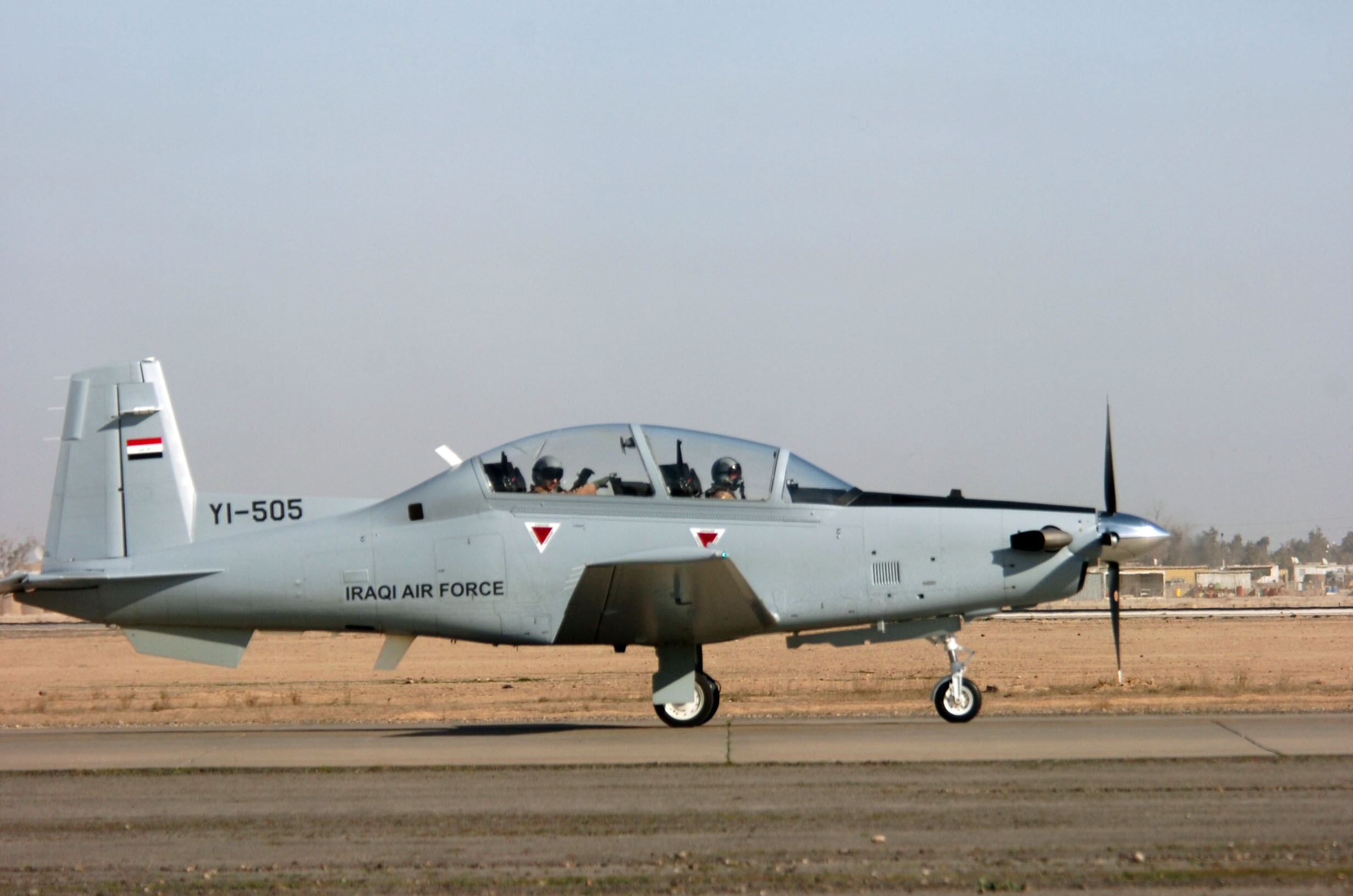
- An Iraqi Air Force T-6 Texan II lands at Tikrit, Iraq
- Active: 1940–1944; 1944–1946; 1972–1977; 1990–1997; 2007–2011
- Country: United States
- Branch: United States Air Force
- Role: Pilot training
- Engagements: Pacific Theater of Operations
- Decorations: Distinguished Unit Citation; Air Force Meritorious Unit Award; Air Force Outstanding Unit Award

Insignia
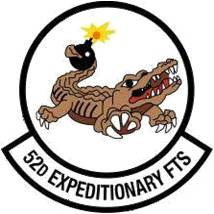
- 52nd Expeditionary Flying Training Squadron emblem (Note: Approved 18 April 1942, reinstated June 1994. Description: On a white disc edged in black, a brown alligator with tail raised holding a black bomb sparked at the fuse.)

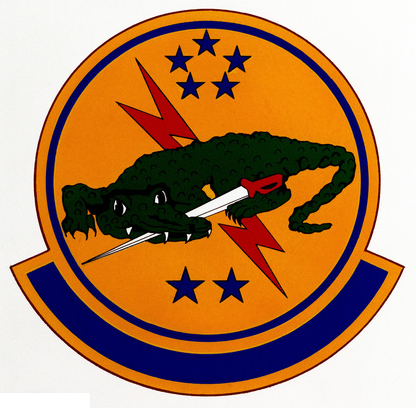
- 52nd Flying Training Sq emblem (Note: Approved c. June 1990.)

The 52nd Expeditionary Flying Training Squadron was part of the Iraq Training and Advisory Mission – Air Force. It operated Cessna and Beechcraft T-6A Texan II aircraft conducting flight training for members of the Iraqi Air Force. In late 2011, all U.S. forces were withdrawn from Iraq and the squadron was inactivated.

The squadron was first activated in 1940 as the 52nd Bombardment Squadron in the build-up of the United States military prior to the country's entry into World War II. Following the attack on Pearl Harbor, the unit began conducting antisubmarine missions over the Gulf of Mexico. When the German U-boat threat diminished, it moved to Idaho, where it was a training unit for heavy bomber units and aircrews. In 1944, the squadron was inactivated when the Army Air Forces reorganized its training activities, but was immediately activated as a very heavy bomber unit. It deployed to the Pacific, where it earned two Distinguished Unit Citations for attacks on Japan. Following V-J Day, the squadron remained in the Pacific until inactivating in 1946.

The squadron was active again in 1972 as the 52nd Flying Training Squadron when it absorbed the resources of another unit at Craig Air Force Base, Alabama. It continued in this role until Craig closed in 1977 as the Air Force demand for pilots diminished following the end of its involvement in Vietnam. The 52nd was active again at Reese Air Force Base, Texas in the pilot training mission from 1990 to 1997. It was converted to provisional status in 2007.

== History ==
=== World War II ===
==== Antisubmarine warfare ====
The squadron was first activated at Langley Field, Virginia, as the 52nd Bombardment Squadron in February 1940, one of the original squadrons of the 29th Bombardment Group. Its organization was part of the pre-World War II buildup of the United States Army Air Corps after the breakout of war in Europe. In May, it moved to MacDill Field, Florida, where it was equipped with a mix of pre-production YB-17s, early model Boeing B-17 Flying Fortresses and Douglas B-18 Bolos. The squadron was still at MacDill when the Japanese attacked Pearl Harbor, and it began to fly antisubmarine patrol missions in the Gulf of Mexico from January 1942. By the summer of 1942, the U-boat threat in the Gulf began to diminish, with all German submarines being withdrawn from the area by September.

==== Heavy bomber training ====
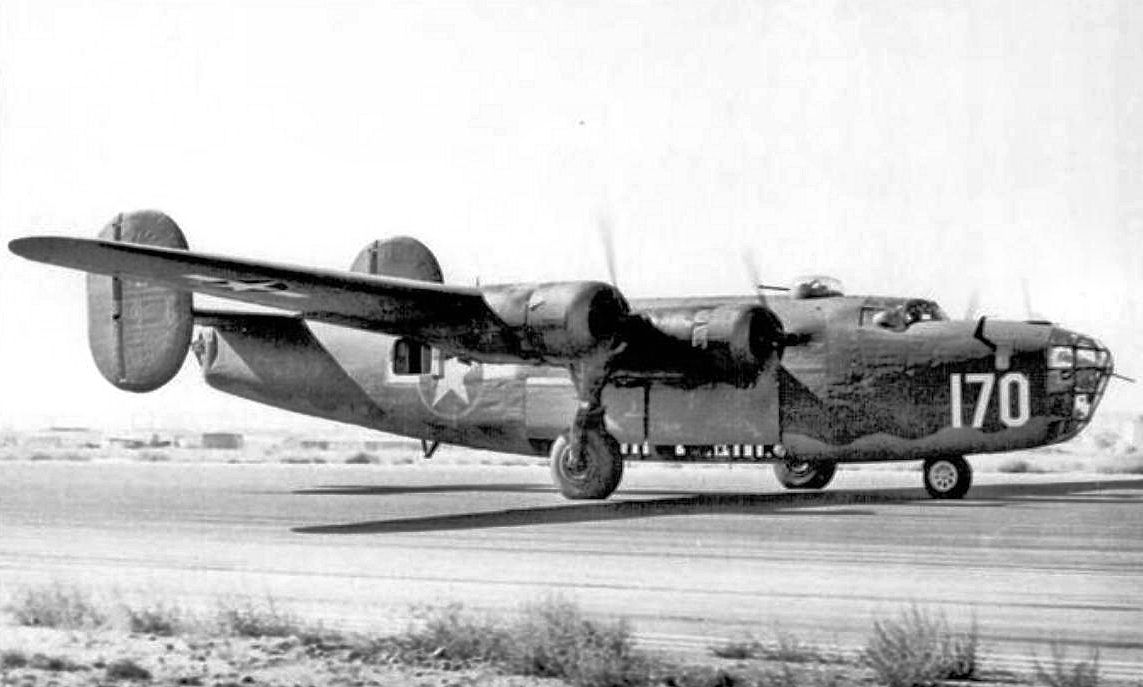
29th Bombardment Group B-24E Liberator in 1944

No longer needed in the Gulf, the squadron moved to Gowen Field, Idaho, where it became an Operational Training Unit(OTU). The OTU program involved the use of an oversized parent unit to provide cadres to "satellite groups". The OTU program was patterned after the unit training system of the Royal Air Force. The parent assumed responsibility for their training and oversaw their expansion with graduates of Army Air Forces Training Command schools to become effective combat units. Phase I training concentrated on individual training in crewmember specialties. Phase II training emphasized the coordination for the crew to act as a team. The final phase concentrated on operation as a unit. The 96th, 381st, 384th and 388th Bombardment Groups were all formed at Gowen in the second half of 1942.

In 1943, the squadron exchanged its B-17s for Consolidated B-24 Liberators. The squadron mission also changed as the Army Air Forces' (AAF) need for new units diminished and its need for replacements increased. The squadron became a Replacement Training Unit (RTU). Like OTUs, RTUs were oversized units, but their mission was to train individual pilots and aircrews. However, standard military units, like the 52nd Squadron, were based on relatively inflexible tables of organization, and were not proving well adapted to the training mission. Accordingly, a more functional system was adopted in which each base was organized into a separate numbered unit. The 29th Bombardment Group and its squadrons (including the 52nd) were inactivated. Its personnel and equipment, along with that of supporting units at Gowen Field were combined into the 212th AAF Base Unit (Combat Crew Training School, Heavy) on 1 April 1944.

==== Combat in the Pacific ====
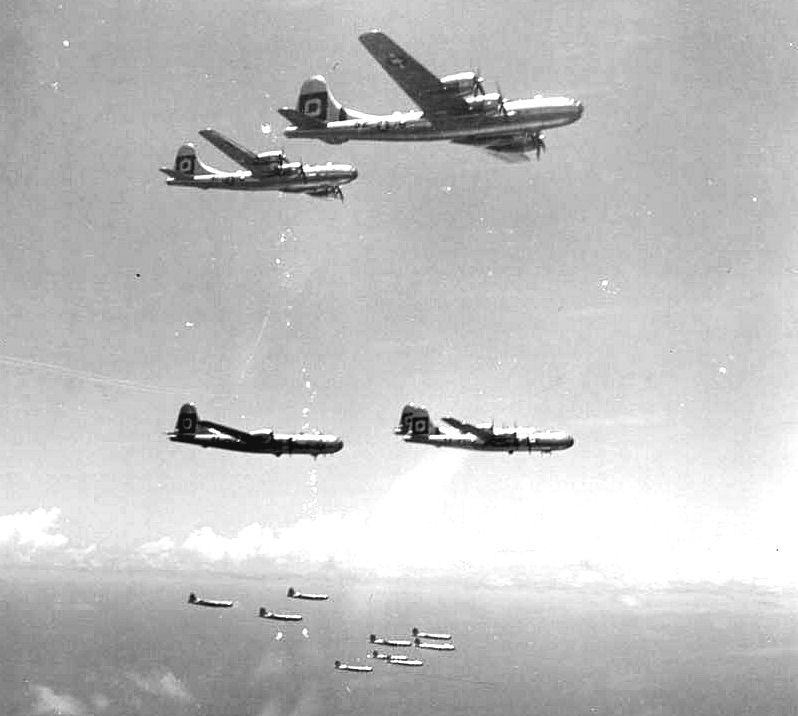
29th Bombardment Group B-29 Formation 1945

The AAF was organizing new Boeing B-29 Superfortress very heavy bombardment units, and the squadron was activated the same day at Pratt Army Air Field, Kansas. It briefly returned to flying B-17s until B-29s became available for training. It continued training with the Superfortress until December 1944. Training included long range overwater flights to Borinquen Field, Puerto Rico.

It deployed to North Field, Guam, where it became a component of the 314th Bombardment Wing of XXI Bomber Command. Its first combat mission was an attack on Tokyo on 25 February 1945. Until March 1945, it engaged primarily in daytime high altitude attacks on strategic targets, such as refineries and factories. The campaign against Japan switched that month and the squadron began to conduct low altitude night raids, using incendiaries against area targets. The squadron received a Distinguished Unit Citation (DUC) for a 31 March attack against an airfield at Omura, Japan. The squadron earned a second DUC in June for an attack on an industrial area of Shizuoka Prefecture, which included an aircraft factory operated by Mitsubishi and the Chigusa Arsenal.

Staff Sergeant Henry E."Red" Erwin of the squadron was awarded the Medal of Honor for action that saved his B-29 during a mission over Koriyama, Japan, on 12 April 1945. Sgt Erwin was assigned to job of dropping white phosphorus bombs through a launching chute in the floor of his bomber. A bomb exploded in the chute and shot back into the plane, severely wounding Sgt Erwin and filling the plane with heavy smoke. Despite being blinded by the burning bomb, he picked it up, carried it forward to the cockpit area of the plane and threw it out an open window. Once the smoke had cleared, the pilot was able to pull the Superfortress out of a dive and recover at an emergency base.

During Operation Iceberg, the invasion of Okinawa, the squadron was diverted from the strategic campaign against Japanese industry and attacked airfields from which kamikaze attacks were being launched against the landing force. Following VJ Day, the squadron dropped food and supplies to Allied prisoners of war and participated in several show of force missions over Japan. It also conducted reconnaissance flights over Japanese cities. The squadron remained on Guam until it was inactivated in March 1946.

=== Pilot training ===
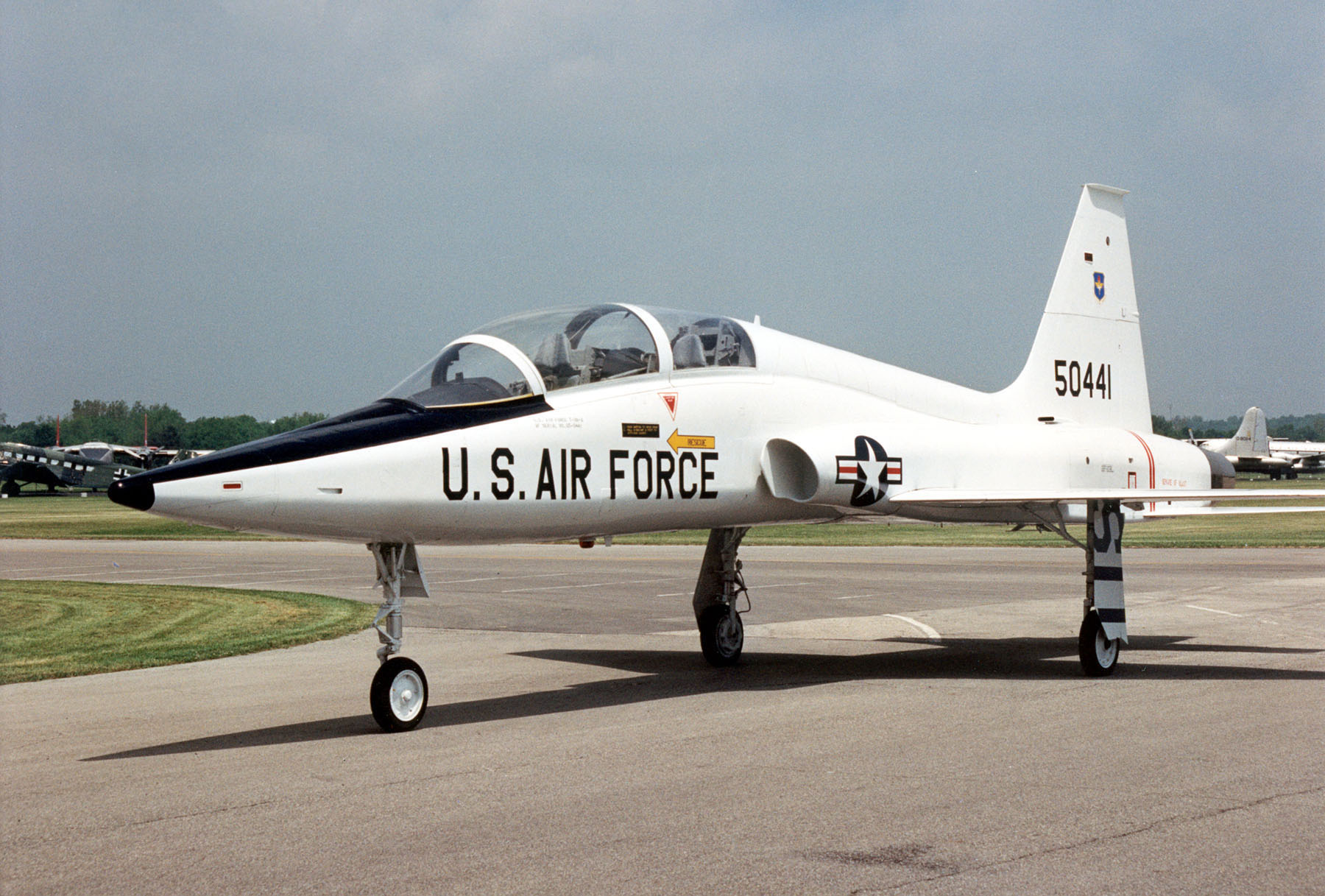
T-38 Talon as flown by the squadron at Craig and Reese

==== Craig Air Force Base ====
The 3617th Pilot Training Squadron was organized at Craig Air Force Base, Alabama in February 1956. Like its parent 3615th Pilot Training Wing, it was a Major Command Controlled (MAJCON) unit and could not retain its history once it was discontinued. In 1972, Air Training Command determined to replace its MAJCON units with permanent, Air Force Controlled units. In this organizational change, on 1 July 1972, the squadron, now designated the 52d Flying Training Squadron took over the personnel, equipment and mission of the 3617th, which was simultaneously inactivated. The squadron conducted the basic portion of Undergraduate Pilot Training with Northrop T-38 Talons. In the fall of 1977, Craig closed and the squadron was inactivated.

==== Reese Air Force Base ====
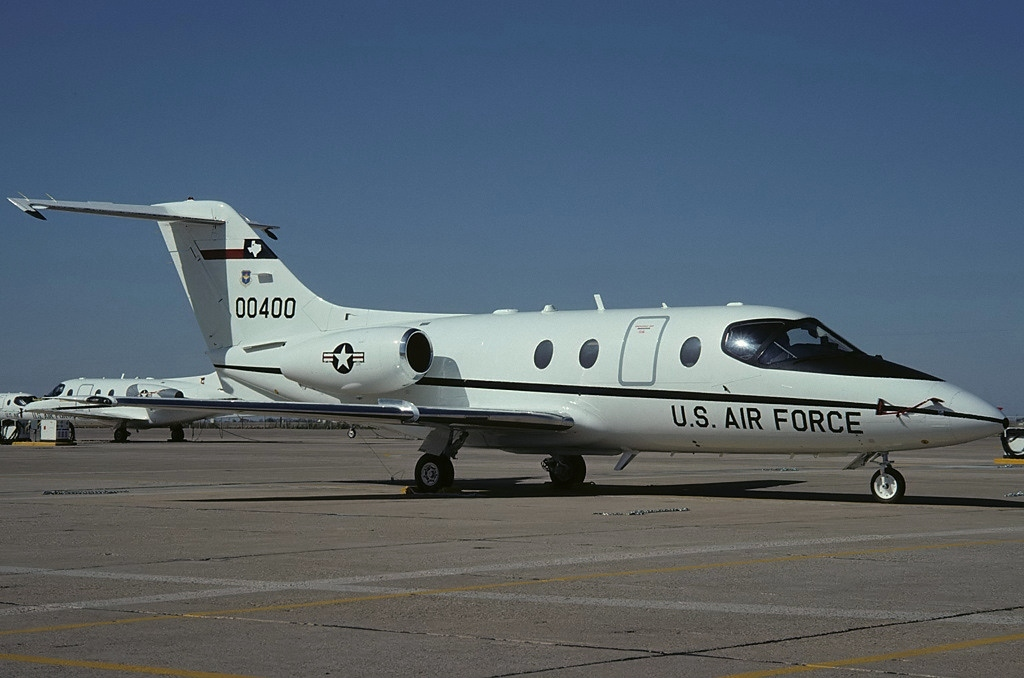
64th Flying Training Wing T-1A Jayhawk

The squadron was reactivated at Reese Air Force Base, Texas in May 1990, under Air Training Command's five squadron concept, which reassigned student pilots to the wing's flying training units. Under this organization, It became the second squadron flying T-38s under the 64th Flying Training Wing. With the implementation of the Objective Wing organization, the squadron became part of the wing's reactivated 64th Operations Group. With the Specialized Undergraduate Pilot Training program limiting instruction in the T-38 to students who would be flying fighter aircraft or bombers, in 1992, the squadron switched to the Raytheon T-1 Jayhawk, training students who would operate tankers and airlift aircraft. To prepare for this project, Air Education and Training Command organized the Flying Training Squadron, Provisional, 52nd at Reese, which was the first squadron to equip with the Jayhawk. On 1 October, the provisional squadron was discontinued and transferred its personnel and equipment to the squadron. Training on the new plane began in January 1993. The 1995 Base Realignment and Closure Commission recommended that Reese be closed and as operations there were reduced, the squadron inactivated on 1 April 1997.

=== Expeditionary operations ===
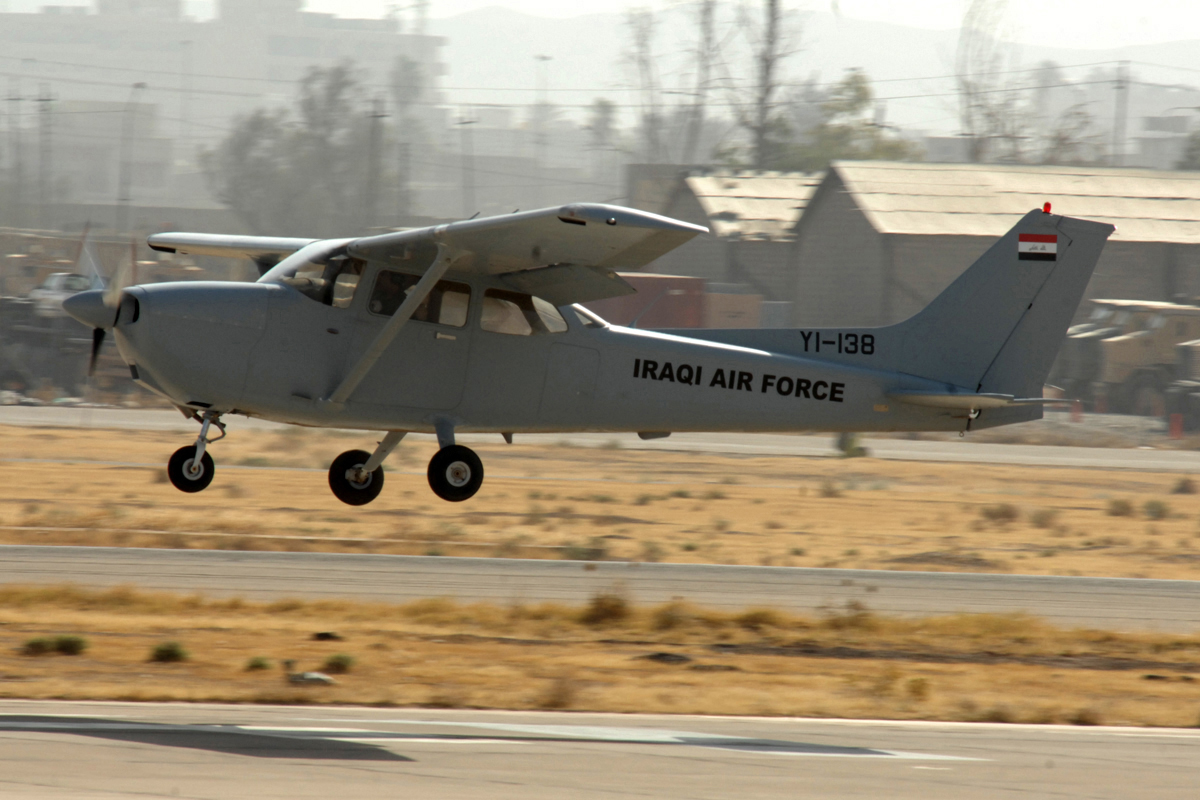
An Iraqi Air Force Cessna 172 lands at Kirkuk Air Base.

In 2007, The squadron was converted to provisional status as the 52nd Expeditionary Flying Training Squadron and activated at Kirkuk Air Base, Iraq on 29 March 2007. Its mission was to train Iraqi airmen and to conduct undergraduate and instructor pilot training for the Iraqi Air Force. The squadron had established a fixed wing pilot training school by October. Its initial students, flying Cessna 172s with Iraqi Air Force markings, were both experienced military pilots, many of whom had not flown for years and who would become instructors for new Iraqi Air Force pilots, and new recruits. Although the USAF had been training experienced Iraqi pilots since 2005, when the Coalition Air Force Training Team was established, the fall of 2007 marked the first training of new pilots.

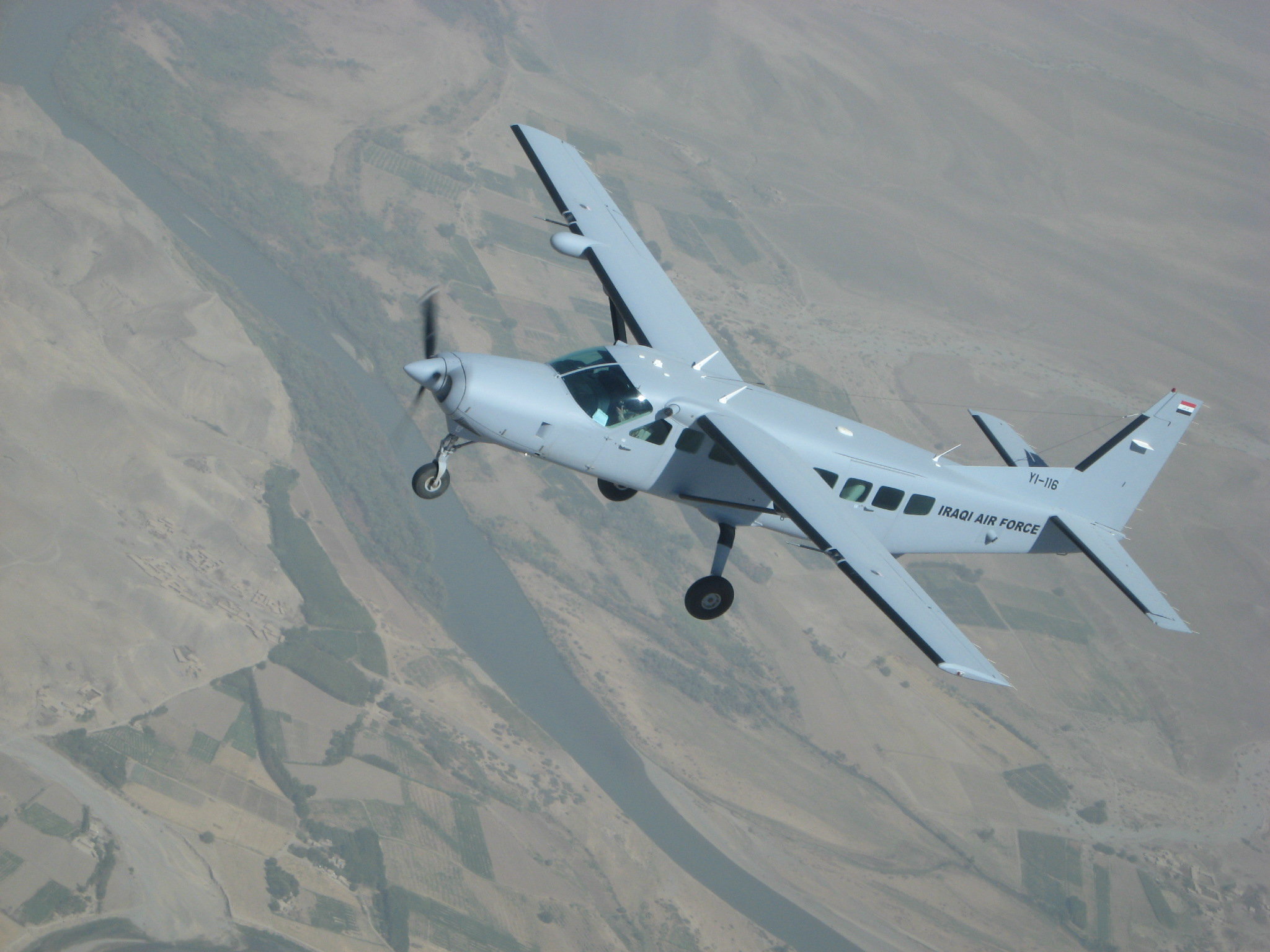
An Iraqi Air Force Cessna 208 flies over Iraq on a training sortie.

By the summer of 2008, the squadron was also training with the Cessna 208 Caravan, and increasing the tempo of training. By October 2008, the first class of new pilots graduated from the fixed wing school operated by the squadron.

In December 2009, the squadron moved to Camp Speicher, at Tikrit, Iraq, transferring its Cessnas to the Iraqi 201st Training Squadron. At Tikrit, it was located with the Iraqi Air Force College, and began to receive Beechcraft T-6A Texan II aircraft. The squadron continued its T-6 training program through September 2011, when the program was transferred to the Iraqi Air Force.

== Lineage ==
- Constituted as the 52d Bombardment Squadron (Heavy) on 22 December 1939

Activated on 1 February 1940
Redesignated 52d Bombardment Squadron, Very Heavy on 28 March 1944
Inactivated on 1 April 1944

- Activated on 1 April 1944

Inactivated on 20 May 1946

- Redesignated 52d Flying Training Squadron on 22 March 1972

Activated on 1 July 1972
Inactivated on 30 September 1977

- Activated on 11 May 1990

Inactivated on 1 April 1997

- Redesignated 52d Expeditionary Flying Training Squadron and converted to provisional status on 23 March 2007

Activated on 29 March 2007
Inactivated 19 December 2011

=== Assignments ===
- 29th Bombardment Group, 1 February 1940 – 1 April 1944
- 29th Bombardment Group, 1 April 1944 – 20 May 1946
- 29th Flying Training Wing, 1 July 1972 – 30 September 1977
- 64th Flying Training Wing, 11 May 1990
- 64th Operations Group, 15 December 1991 – 1 April 1997
- 370th Air Expeditionary Advisory Group, 29 March 2007 – 19 December 2011

=== Stations ===
- Langley Field, Virginia, 1 February 1940
- MacDill Field, Florida, 21 May 1940
- Gowen Field, Idaho, 25 June 1942 – 1 April 1944
- Pratt Army Air Field, Kansas, 1 April–c. 6 December 1944
- North Field, Guam, Mariana Islands, 17 January 1945 – 20 May 1946
- Craig Air Force Base, Alabama, 1 July 1972 – 30 September 1977
- Reese Air Force Base, Texas, 11 May 1990 – 1 April 1997
- Kirkuk Air Base (FOB Warrior), Iraq, 29 March 2007
- Contingency Operating Base Speicher, Tikrit, Iraq, December 2009 – 19 December 2011)

=== Aircraft ===
- Douglas B-18 Bolo (1940–1941)
- Boeing B-17 Flying Fortress (1940–1944)
- Consolidated B-24 Liberator (1943–1944)
- Boeing B-29 Superfortress (1944–1946)
- Northrop T-38 Talon (1972–1977, 1990–1992)
- Raytheon T-1 Jayhawk (1992–1997)
- Cessna 172 (2007–2009)
- Cessna 208 Caravan (2008–2009)
- Beechcraft T-6A Texan II (2009–2011)

=== Awards and campaigns ===
Award streamer	Award	Dates	Notes
	Distinguished Unit Citation	Japan, 31 March 1945	52nd Bombardment Squadron
	Distinguished Unit Citation	Japan, 19–26 June 1945	52nd Bombardment Squadron
	Air Force Meritorious Unit Award	1 June 2011-19 December 2011	52nd Expeditionary Flying Training Squadron
	Air Force Outstanding Unit Award	1 January-31 December 1973	52nd Flying Training Squadron
	Air Force Outstanding Unit Award	1 January 1976-28 February 1977	52nd Flying Training Squadron
	Air Force Outstanding Unit Award	1 October 1995-1 April 1977	52nd Flying Training Squadron

Campaign Streamer	Campaign	Dates	Notes
	Antisubmarine	7 December 1941 – 25 June 1942	52nd Bombardment Squadron
	American Theater without inscription	7 December 1941–c. 6 December 1944	52nd Bombardment Squadron
	Air Offensive, Japan	17 January 1945 – 2 September 1945	52nd Bombardment Squadron
	Western Pacific	17 April 1945 – 2 September 1945	52nd Bombardment Squadron
	Iraqi Governance	29 June 2004 – 15 December 2005	52nd Expeditionary Flying Training Squadron
	National Resolution	2007	52nd Expeditionary Flying Training Squadron
	Iraqi Surge	29 March 2007 – 31 December 2008	52nd Expeditionary Flying Training Squadron
	Iraqi Sovereignty	1 January 2009 – 31 August 2010	52nd Expeditionary Flying Training Squadron
	New Dawn	1 September 2010 – 19 December 2011	52nd Expeditionary Flying Training Squadron
