= Henry E. Erwin =

US Army Air Forces NCO and Medal of Honor recipient

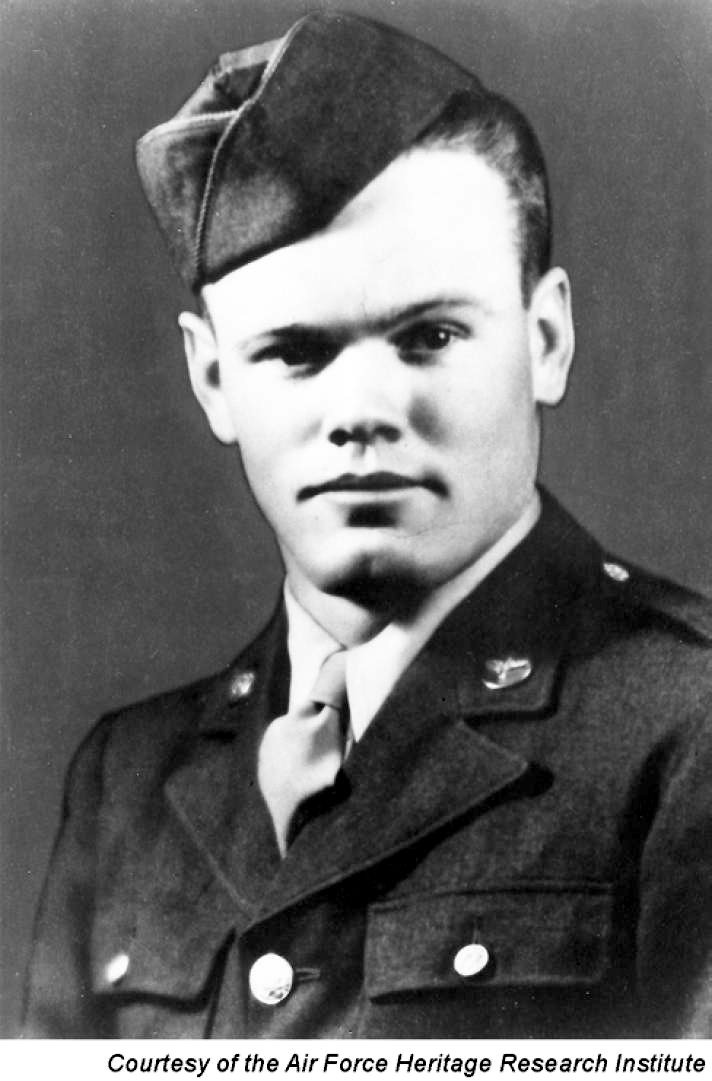
- Born: Henry Eugene Erwin Sr. May 8, 1921; Adamsville, Alabama, US
- Died: January 16, 2002 (aged 80); Birmingham, Alabama, US
- Burial place: Elmwood Cemetery (Birmingham, Alabama)
- Military career
- Allegiance: United States of America
- Branch: United States Army Air Forces
- Service years: 1942–1947
- Rank: Master Sergeant
- Nickname: Red
- Units: 52nd Bombardment Squadron, 29th Bombardment Group, 20th Air Force
- Conflicts: World War II
- Awards: Medal of Honor; Purple Heart; Air Medal (2)

Henry Eugene Erwin Sr. (May 8, 1921 – January 16, 2002) was a United States Army Air Forces airman and a recipient of the U.S. military's highest decoration—the Medal of Honor—for his actions in World War II. He earned the award as a staff sergeant and radio operator aboard a B-29 Superfortress in the Asia-Pacific theater. During a 1945 bombing mission over Koriyama, Japan, a white phosphorus bomb prematurely ignited in his aircraft and seriously wounded him. As smoke filled the plane, he picked up the burning device and carried it through the aircraft to the cockpit where he tossed it out a window. Although he suffered severe burns, he successfully saved his plane and all crew members aboard by disposing of the incendiary/smoke-generating bomb. He is the first and only Boeing B-29 Superfortress crew member to receive the Medal of Honor.

== Military service ==
Erwin was born on May 8, 1921, in Adamsville, Alabama. Like many of his generation, he grew up in poverty and lost his father at an early age. However, he had a very strong religious faith, which he discussed on a History Channel documentary on Medal of Honor recipients in 1999. Erwin said, "I called on the Lord to help me and He has never let me down". Erwin joined the Army Reserve from nearby Bessemer on July 27, 1942. Called to active duty as an aviation cadet in the Army Air Forces on February 3, 1943, he trained as a pilot in Ocala, Florida, but washed out due to "flying deficiency". He was instead transferred to technical school at Keesler Air Force Base, Mississippi, as a private first class in July of that year. He completed further radio operator and radio mechanic training in Sioux Falls, South Dakota, and Madison, Wisconsin, until his graduation in 1944.

Assigned to the 52d Bombardment Squadron, 29th Bombardment Group, Twentieth Air Force, in Dalhart, Texas, Erwin and his unit left for the Asia-Pacific theater in early 1945. From February 25 to April 1 of that year, they participated in a series of unescorted bombing strikes against cities in the heart of Japan. For these missions, Erwin, by then a staff sergeant, received two Air Medals. Erwin served as a radio operator gunner during his time in the service. He was medically discharged from the Army Air Force on October 27, 1947, having served 5 years, 2 months, and 12 days. During World War II, he participated in the Air Raids on Japan campaign and the Western Pacific campaign.

=== Medal of Honor action ===
On April 12, 1945, Erwin, called "Red" by his crewmates, was serving as the radio operator aboard a Boeing B-29 Superfortress named City of Los Angeles, piloted by Captain George Simeral. The plane was in formation for a low-level attack on a chemical plant at Koriyama, 120 miles (190 km) north of Tokyo, on their 11th combat mission. Along with their primary jobs, the 12 B-29 crew members had additional duties to perform. Erwin's was to drop phosphorus smoke bombs through a chute in the aircraft's floor when the lead plane reached a designated assembly area. He was given the signal to drop the bombs when the aircraft was just off the south coast of Japan and under attack by antiaircraft fire and Japanese fighters.

Erwin pulled the pin and released a bomb into the chute, but the fuse malfunctioned and ignited the phosphorus prematurely, burning at 1500 °F (815 °C). The canister flew back up the chute and into Erwin's face, blinding him, searing off one ear and obliterating his nose. Phosphorus pentoxide smoke immediately filled the aircraft, making it impossible for the pilot to see his instrument panel. Erwin was afraid the bomb would burn through the metal floor and make contact with the bomb bay. Completely blind, he picked it up and, feeling his way, crawled around the gun turret and headed for the copilot's window. His face and arms were covered with ignited phosphorus, and his path was blocked by the navigator's folding table, hinged to the wall, but down and locked. The navigator had left his table to make a sighting. Erwin could not release the table's latches with one hand, so he grabbed the white-hot bomb between his bare right arm and his ribcage. In the few seconds needed to raise the table, the phosphorus burned through his flesh to the bone. His body on fire, he stumbled into the cockpit, threw the bomb out the window, and collapsed between the pilot's seats.

The smoke cleared enough for Simeral to pull the B-29 out of a dive at 300 feet (91 m) above the water and turn toward Iwo Jima, where Erwin could be given emergency treatment. His crew members extinguished his burning clothes and administered first aid, but whenever Erwin's burns were uncovered, phosphorus embedded in his skin would begin to smolder; white phosphorus is known to cause extremely terrible wounds, as the burning chemical cannot be extinguished if oxygen is present, and continues to burn through flesh until it consumes itself or is extracted. It is also toxic. Although in excruciating pain, he remained conscious throughout the flight and spoke only to inquire about the safety of the crew. Once on Iwo Jima, the medical personnel who examined Erwin expected him to die.

Army Air Force officials, led by Major General Curtis LeMay and Brigadier General Lauris Norstad, approved Erwin's award of the Medal of Honor in a matter of hours so that a presentation could be made while he still lived. A medal was expeditiously flown from Hawaii to Guam and presented to him in the hospital there. Amazingly, though, Erwin survived his burns. He was flown back to the United States, and after 30 months and 41 surgeries, his eyesight was restored and he regained use of one arm. He received a disability discharge as a master sergeant in October 1947.

== Later life ==
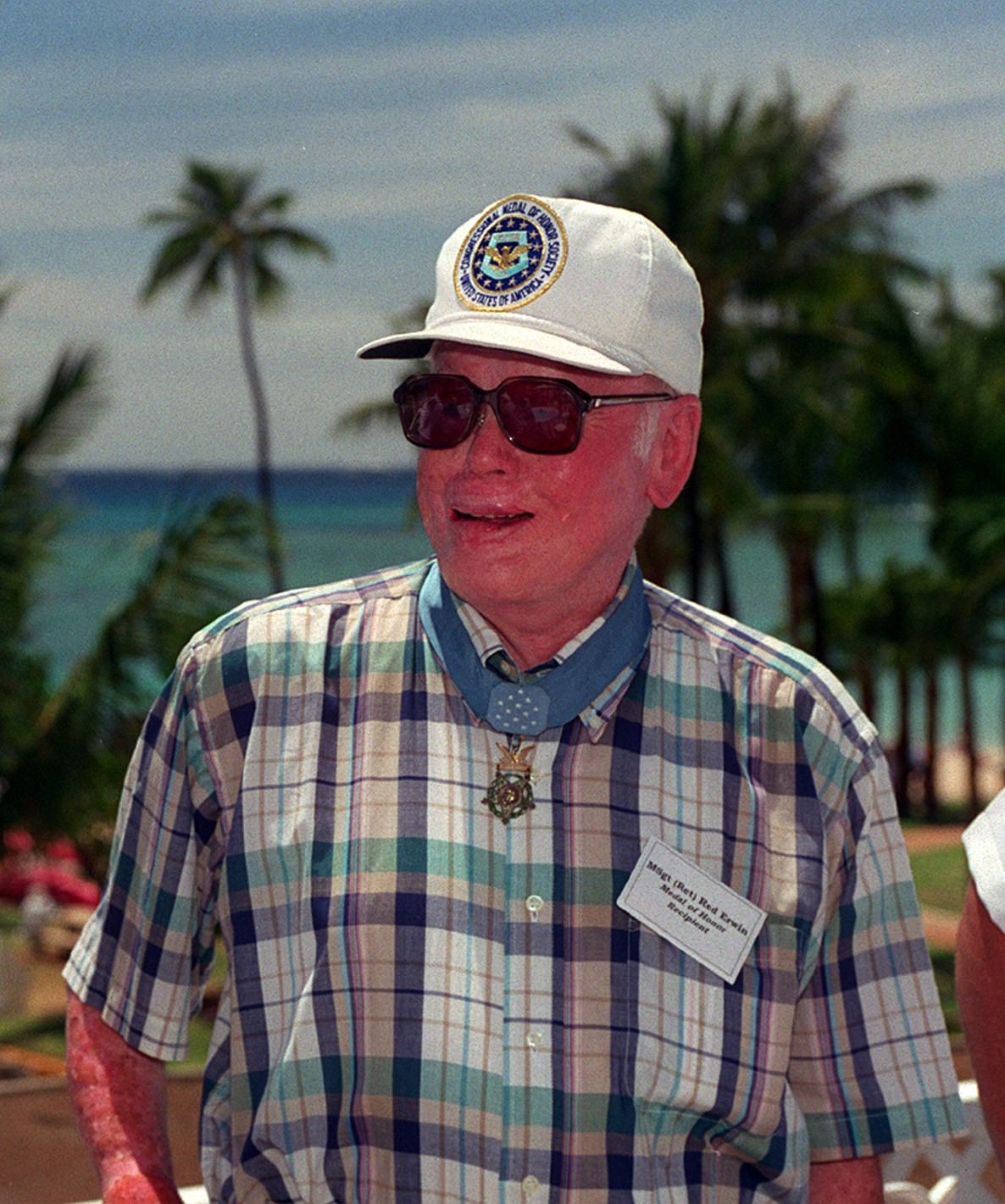
Erwin in 1995 at a ceremony commemorating the 50th anniversary of the end of World War II

For 37 years, Erwin served as a benefits counselor at the veterans' hospital in Birmingham, Alabama. In 1951, his story was included in the movie The Wild Blue Yonder; Erwin was portrayed by Dave Sharpe.

In 1997, the Air Force created the Henry E. Erwin Outstanding Enlisted Aircrew Member of the Year Award. It is presented annually to an airman, noncommissioned officer and senior noncommissioned officer in the flight engineering, loadmaster, air surveillance and related career fields. It is only the second Air Force award named for an enlisted person.

Erwin died at his home on January 16, 2002, and was buried at Elmwood Cemetery in Birmingham, Alabama. His son, Hank Erwin, became an Alabama state senator.

== Awards and decorations ==
In addition to the Medal of Honor and two Air Medals received earlier in 1945, he was also awarded the Purple Heart, the World War II Victory Medal, the American Campaign Medal, three Good Conduct Medals, the Asiatic-Pacific Campaign Medal with two bronze campaign stars (for participation in the Air Offensive Japan and Western Pacific campaigns), and the Distinguished Unit Citation Emblem.

On April 4, 2024 the headquarters building of the Twentieth Air Force command at F.E. Warren AFB in Cheyenne, Wyoming was renamed "Erwin Hall" in his honor.

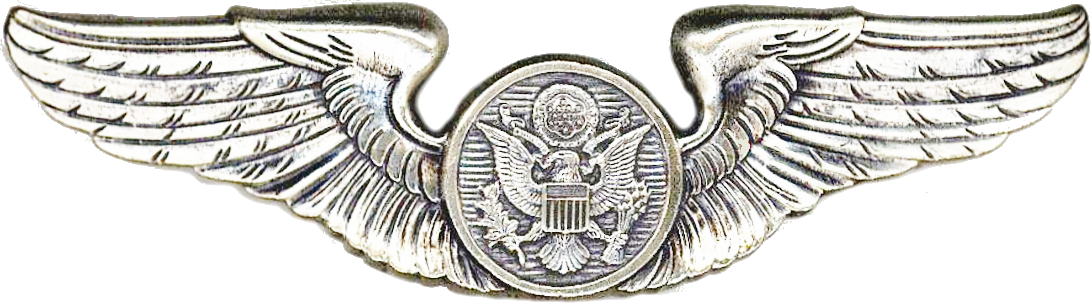

USAAF Aircrew Badge
Medal of Honor
Purple Heart	Air Medal with bronze oak leaf cluster	Army Good Conduct Medal with two good conduct loops
American Campaign Medal	Asiatic-Pacific Campaign Medal with two bronze campaign stars	World War II Victory Medal

Army Presidential Unit Citation

=== Medal of Honor citation ===
Erwin's official Medal of Honor citation reads:

He was the radio operator of a B-29 airplane leading a group formation to attack Koriyama, Japan. He was charged with the additional duty of dropping phosphoresce smoke bombs to aid in assembling the group when the launching point was reached. Upon entering the assembly area, aircraft fire and enemy fighter opposition was encountered. Among the phosphoresce bombs launched by S/Sgt. Erwin, 1 proved faulty, exploding in the launching chute, and shot back into the interior of the aircraft, striking him in the face. The burning phosphoresce obliterated his nose and completely blinded him. Smoke filled the plane, obscuring the vision of the pilot. S/Sgt. Erwin realized that the aircraft and crew would be lost if the burning bomb remained in the plane. Without regard for his own safety, he picked it up and feeling his way, instinctively, crawled around the gun turret and headed for the copilot's window. He found the navigator's table obstructing his passage. Grasping the burning bomb between his forearm and body, he unleashed the spring lock and raised the table. Struggling through the narrow passage he stumbled forward into the smoke-filled pilot's compartment. Groping with his burning hands, he located the window and threw the bomb out. Completely aflame, he fell back upon the floor. The smoke cleared, the pilot, at 300 feet, pulled the plane out of its dive. S/Sgt. Erwin's gallantry and heroism above and beyond the call of duty saved the lives of his comrades.

== See also ==
- List of Medal of Honor recipients for World War II
- John Levitow – awarded the Medal of Honor for similar actions
