= Adamsville, Alabama =

City in Alabama, United States

- City
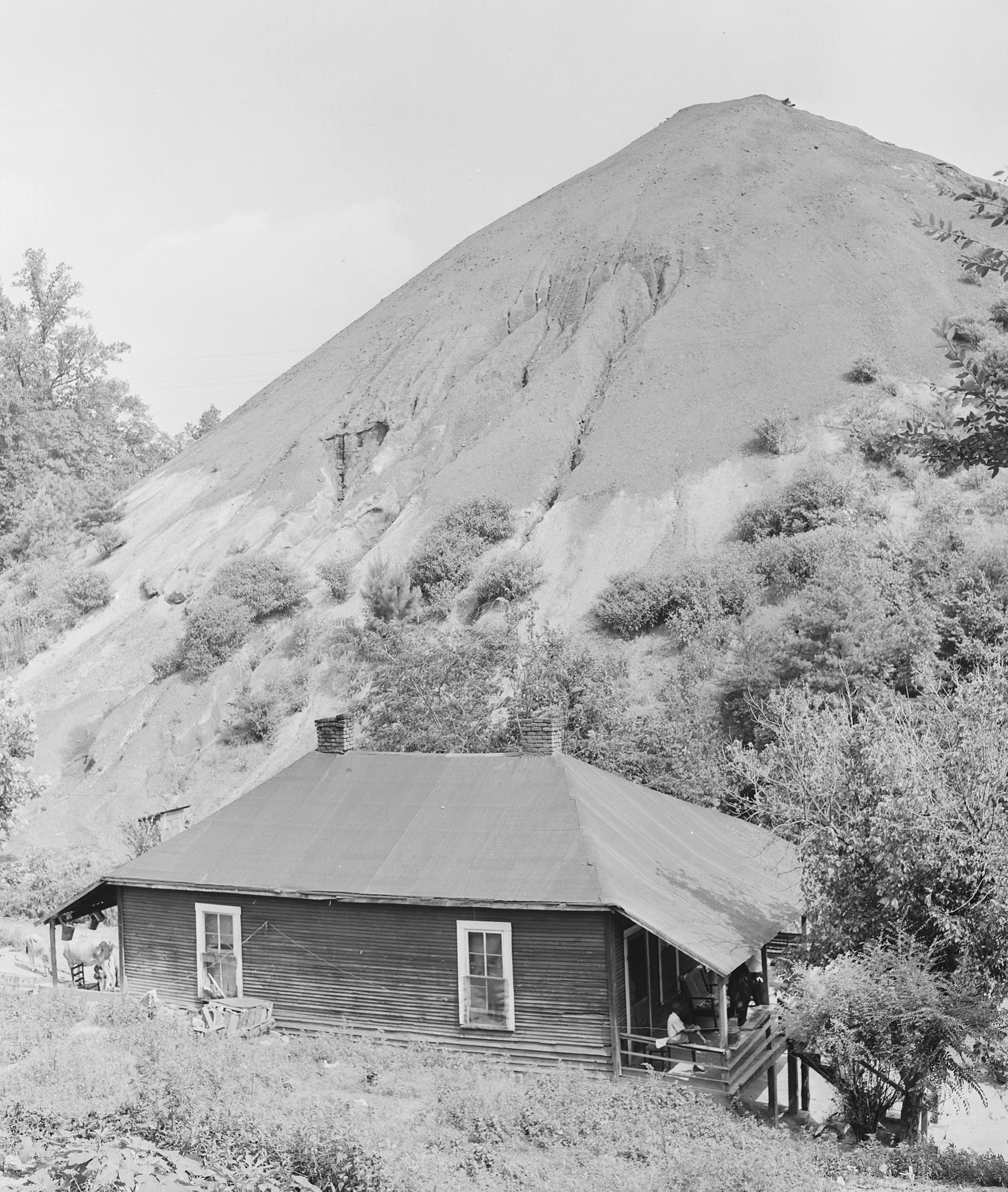
- Porter Mine Company Housing for Black Miner in Adamsville, 1946
- Nickname: Adam
- Location of Adamsville in Jefferson County, Alabama.
- Coordinates: 33°36′50″N 87°00′14″W
- Country: United States
- State: Alabama
- County: Jefferson

Government
  - Mayor: Nathaniel Byrd

Area
  - Total: 26.42 sq mi (68.44 km^{2})
  - Land: 26.22 sq mi (67.90 km^{2})
  - Water: 0.21 sq mi (0.54 km^{2}) 0.05%
- Elevation: 610 ft (190 m)

Population (2020)
  - Total: 4,366
  - Density: 167/sq mi (64.3/km^{2})
- Time zone: UTC-6 (CST)
  - Summer (DST): UTC-5 (CDT)
- ZIP code: 35005
- Area codes: 205 & 659
- FIPS code: 01-00460
- GNIS feature ID: 2403063
- Website: www.cityofadamsville.org

Adamsville is a city in western Jefferson County, Alabama, United States. It is north from the Birmingham suburb of Pleasant Grove. It initially incorporated in 1901 (although the 1910 U.S. Census stated 1900), but disincorporated in 1915. It later reincorporated in 1953. As of the 2020 census, Adamsville had a population of 4,366.

== Geography ==
According to the United States Census Bureau, the town has a total area of 19.6 square miles (51 km^{2}), of which 19.6 square miles (51 km^{2}) is land and 0.05% is water.

== Demographics ==
=== Adamsville ===
Historical population
| Census | Pop. | Note | %± |
|---|---|---|---|
| 1910 | 649 | | — |
| 1950 | 1,531 | | — |
| 1960 | 2,095 | | 36.8% |
| 1970 | 2,412 | | 15.1% |
| 1980 | 2,498 | | 3.6% |
| 1990 | 4,161 | | 66.6% |
| 2000 | 4,965 | | 19.3% |
| 2010 | 4,522 | | −8.9% |
| 2020 | 4,366 | | −3.4% |
U.S. Decennial Census

Adamsville first appeared on the 1910 U.S. Census as an incorporated town. It disincorporated in 1915 and did not appear on the census again until 1950, when it reported as an unincorporated village. It reincorporated in 1953 as town and has appeared on every successive census to date. In the 1960s, it upgraded from town to city status.

=== Racial and ethnic composition ===
Adamsville city, Alabama – Racial and ethnic composition Note: the US Census treats Hispanic/Latino as an ethnic category. This table excludes Latinos from the racial categories and assigns them to a separate category. Hispanics/Latinos may be of any race. Race and ethnicity were not surveyed for populations under 2,500 in 1980 and under 1,000 in 1990.
| Race / Ethnicity (NH = Non-Hispanic) | Pop 1990 | Pop 2000 | Pop 2010 | Pop 2020 | % 1990 | % 2000 | % 2010 | % 2020 |
|---|---|---|---|---|---|---|---|---|
| White alone (NH) | 3,482 | 3,749 | 2,324 | 1,724 | 83.68% | 75.51% | 51.39% | 39.49% |
| Black or African American alone (NH) | 659 | 1,130 | 2,025 | 2,300 | 15.84% | 22.76% | 44.78% | 52.68% |
| Native American or Alaska Native alone (NH) | 5 | 20 | 22 | 18 | 0.12% | 0.40% | 0.49% | 0.41% |
| Asian alone (NH) | 3 | 7 | 12 | 10 | 0.12% | 0.14% | 0.27% | 0.23% |
| Native Hawaiian or Pacific Islander alone (NH) | x | 1 | 0 | 3 | x | 0.02% | 0.00% | 0.07% |
| Other race alone (NH) | 0 | 0 | 3 | 16 | 0.00% | 0.00% | 0.07% | 0.37% |
| Mixed race or Multiracial (NH) | x | 32 | 34 | 113 | x | 0.64% | 0.75% | 2.59% |
| Hispanic or Latino (any race) | 12 | 26 | 102 | 182 | 0.29% | 0.52% | 2.26% | 4.17% |
| Total | 4,161 | 4,965 | 4,522 | 4,366 | 100.00% | 100.00% | 100.00% | 100.00% |

=== 2020 census ===
As of the 2020 census, there were 4,366 people, 1,717 households, and 1,032 families residing in the city. The median age was 42.5 years. 21.6% of residents were under the age of 18 and 18.6% of residents were 65 years of age or older. For every 100 females there were 84.8 males, and for every 100 females age 18 and over there were 82.6 males age 18 and over.

89.3% of residents lived in urban areas, while 10.7% lived in rural areas.

There were 1,717 households in Adamsville, of which 30.6% had children under the age of 18 living in them. Of all households, 39.6% were married-couple households, 18.4% were households with a male householder and no spouse or partner present, and 36.8% were households with a female householder and no spouse or partner present. About 27.9% of all households were made up of individuals and 13.2% had someone living alone who was 65 years of age or older.

There were 1,979 housing units, of which 13.2% were vacant. The homeowner vacancy rate was 2.0% and the rental vacancy rate was 9.9%.

=== 2010 census ===
At the 2010 census, there were 4,522 people, 1,752 households and 1,253 families living in the town. The population density was 230.7 inhabitants per square mile (89.1/km^{2}). There were 1,990 housing units at an average density of 101.5 per square mile (39.2/km^{2}). The racial makeup of the town was 52.3% White, 44.9% Black or African American, 0.5% Native American, 0.3% Asian, 0.0% Pacific Islander, 1.1% from other races, and 0.8% from two or more races. 2.3% of the population were Hispanic or Latino of any race.

There were 1,752 households, of which 27.7% had children under the age of 18 living with them, 47.6% were married couples living together, 18.0% had a female householder with no husband present, and 28.5% were non-families. 24.7% of all households were made up of individuals, and 10.4% had someone living alone who was 65 years of age or older. The average household size was 2.57 and the average family size was 3.08.

23.6% of the population were under the age of 18, 8.1% from 18 to 24, 25.1% from 25 to 44, 27.2% from 45 to 64, and 15.9% who were 65 years of age or older. The median age was 39.9 years. For every 100 females, there were 88.6 males. For every 100 females age 18 and over, there were 92.4 males.

The median household income was $52,167 and the median family income was $56,551. Males had a median income of $41,176 compared with $31,349 for females. The per capita income for the town was $23,461. About 7.9% of families and 11.0% of the population were below the poverty line, including 21.1% of those under age 18 and 10.1% of those age 65 or over.

=== 2000 census ===
At the 2000 census, there were 4,965 people, 1,930 households and 1,464 families living in the town. The population density was 253.2 inhabitants per square mile (97.8/km^{2}). There were 2,042 housing units at an average density of 104.2 per square mile (40.2/km^{2}). The racial makeup of the town was 75.79% White, 22.82% Black or African American, 0.40% Native American, 0.14% Asian, 0.02% Pacific Islander, 0.16% from other races, and 0.66% from two or more races. 0.52% of the population were Hispanic or Latino of any race.

There were 1,930 households, of which 32.1% had children under the age of 18 living with them, 59.1% were married couples living together, 13.5% had a female householder with no husband present, and 24.1% were non-families. 21.7% of all households were made up of individuals, and 9.1% had someone living alone who was 65 years of age or older. The average household size was 2.56 and the average family size was 2.97.

23.1% of the population were under the age of 18, 8.0% from 18 to 24, 27.6% from 25 to 44, 25.1% from 45 to 64, and 16.1% who were 65 years of age or older. The median age was 39 years. For every 100 females, there were 90.9 males. For every 100 females age 18 and over, there were 88.2 males.

The median household income was $39,563 and the median family income was $46,270. Males had a median income of $36,188 compared with $22,292 for females. The per capita income for the town was $18,496. About 5.1% of families and 6.4% of the population were below the poverty line, including 10.3% of those under age 18 and 9.1% of those age 65 or over.

== Adamsville Census Division (1960-70) ==
Historical population
| Census | Pop. | Note | %± |
|---|---|---|---|
| 1960 | 16,020 | | — |
| 1970 | 18,941 | | 18.2% |
U.S. Decennial Census

The Jefferson County Census Division of Adamsville was created in 1960 as part of a general reorganization of counties, which included the town of Adamsville and the surrounding areas. From 1910 to 1960, Adamsville had been in the unnamed 39th precinct of Jefferson County. In 1980, Adamsville became a part of the Graysville-Adamsville Census Division.

== Notable people ==
- Henry E. Erwin, Medal of Honor recipient during World War II
- Brandon Johnson, former NFL linebacker and 2001 Minor High School graduate
- Jim King, head football coach of the University of West Alabama from 1973 to 1976
- Bryan Thomas, former linebacker and defensive end for the New York Jets
- Chris Williams, professional basketball player and 1998 graduate of Minor High School
- Nick Williams, NFL defensive end and 2008 graduate of Minor High School

== Gallery ==
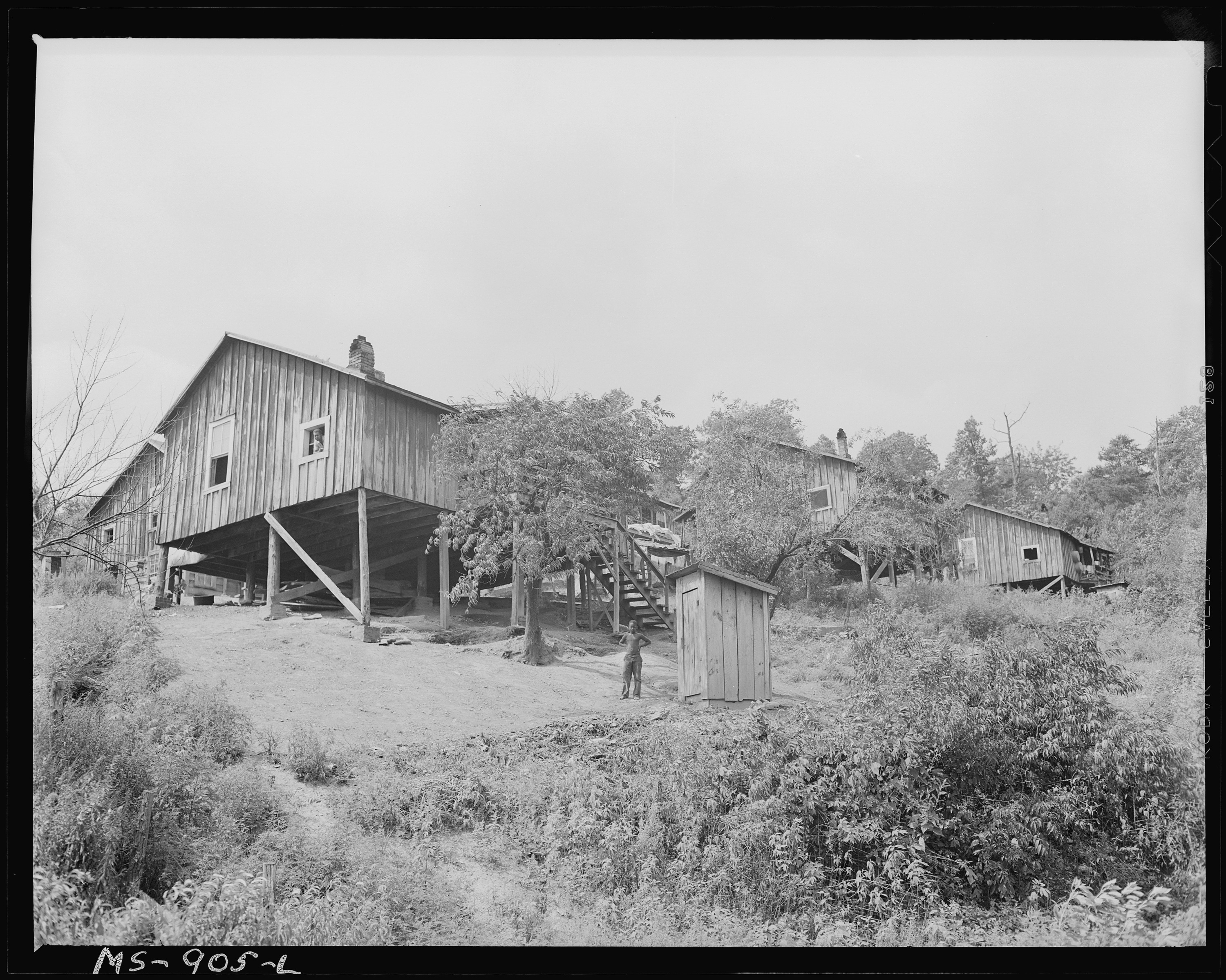
Home of Black miners in company housing project, 1946

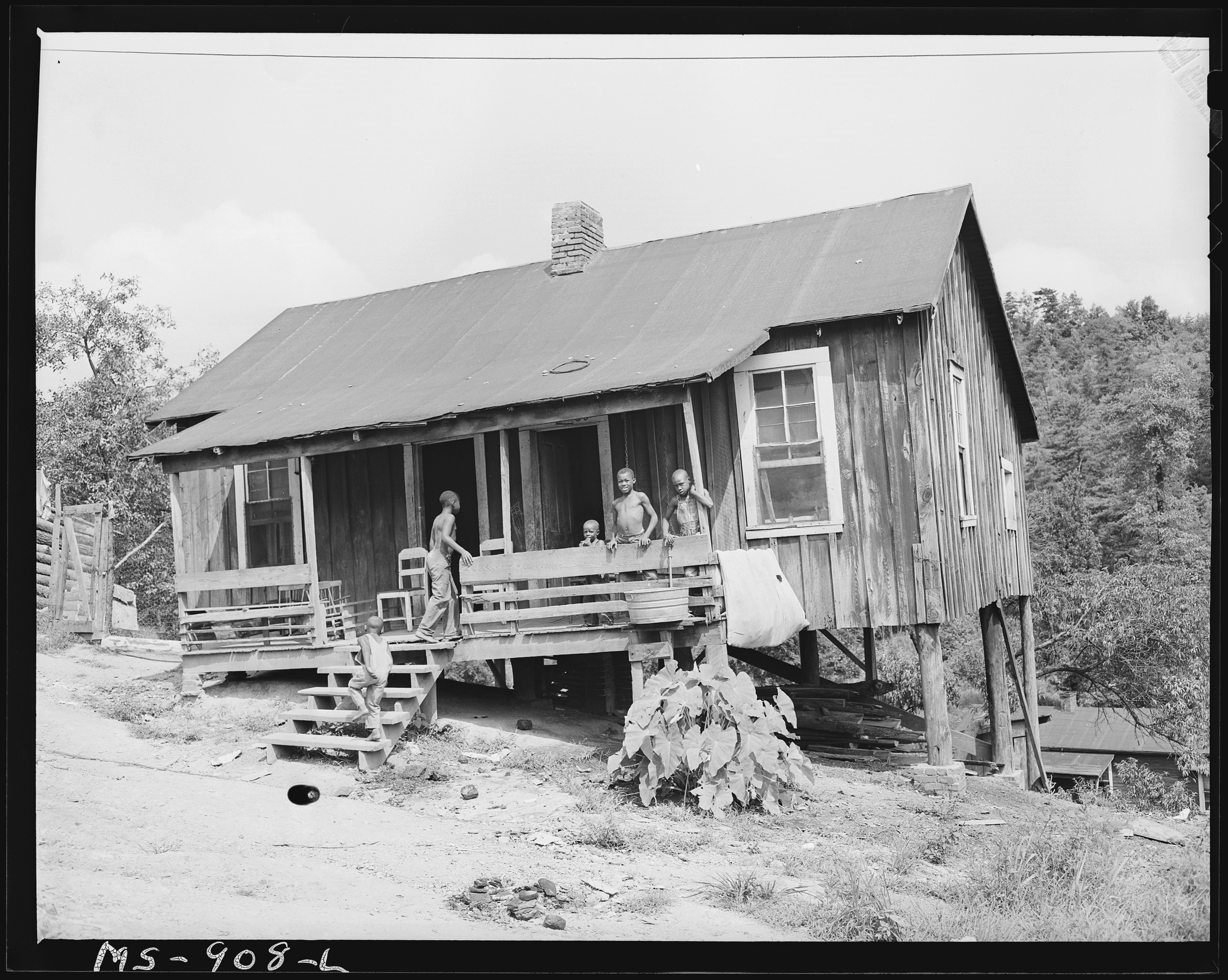
Children on porch of home of Black miners in company housing project, 1946

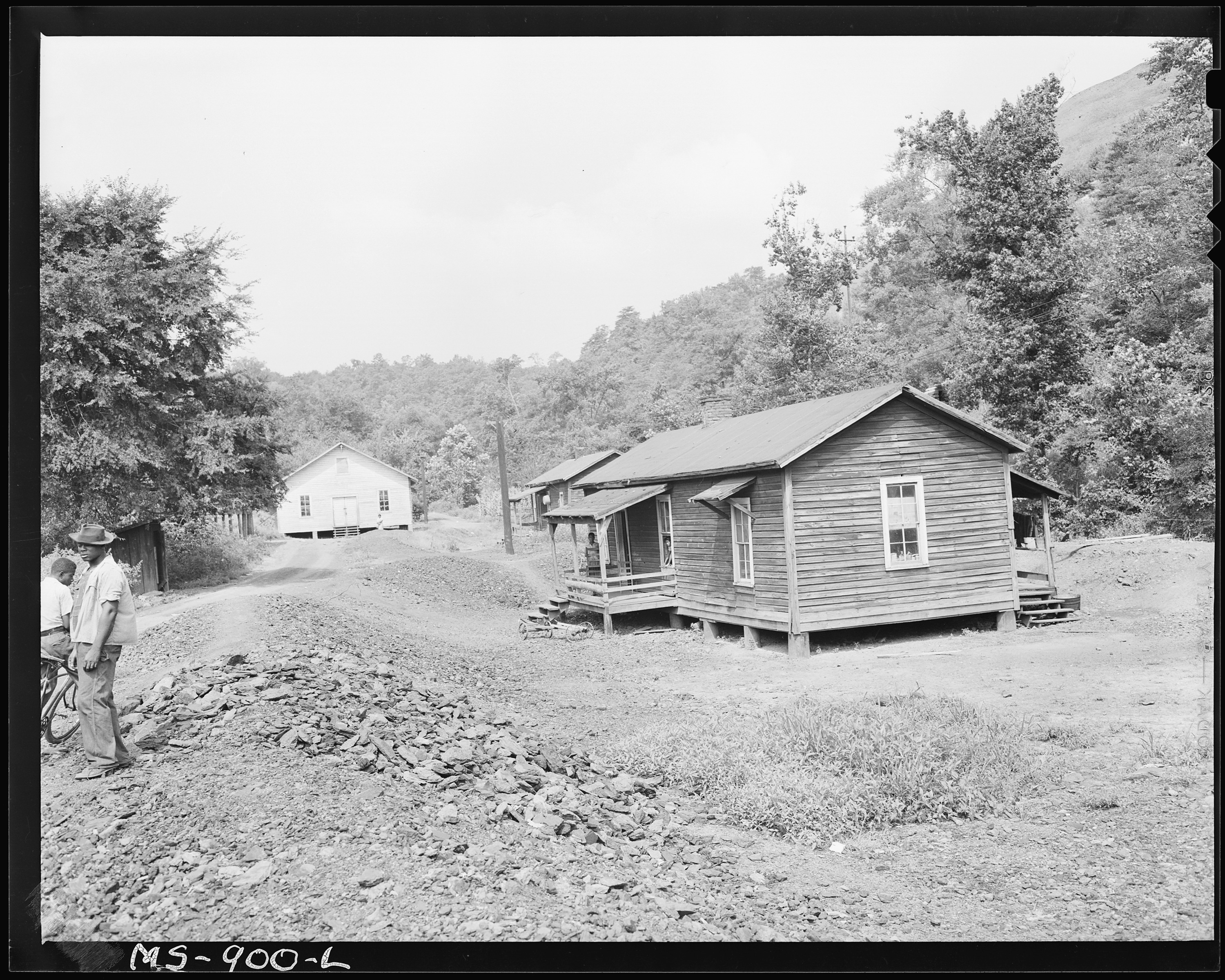
Homes for Black miners in company housing project, 1946

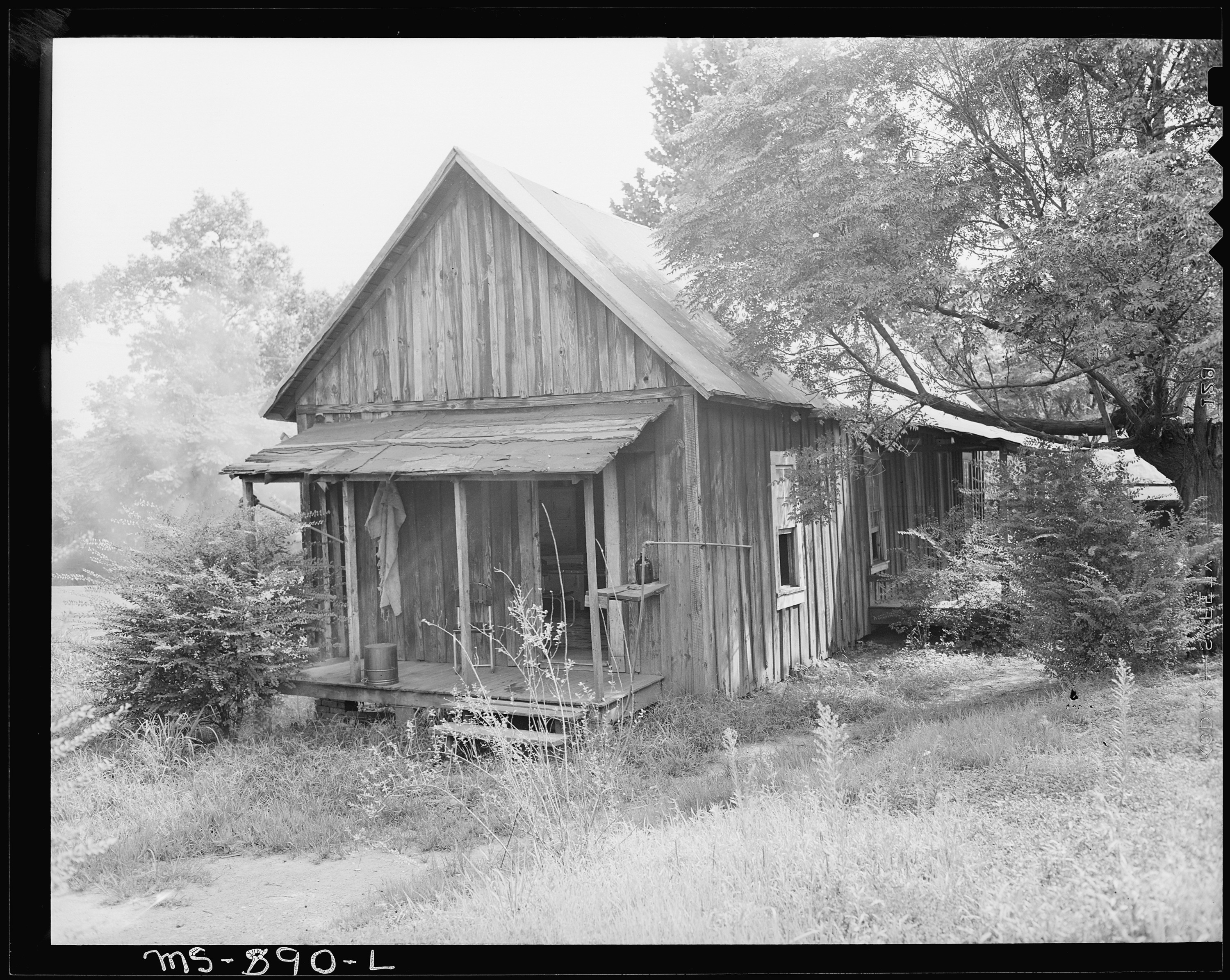
Home of Alvis New, Miner, living in company housing project, 1946

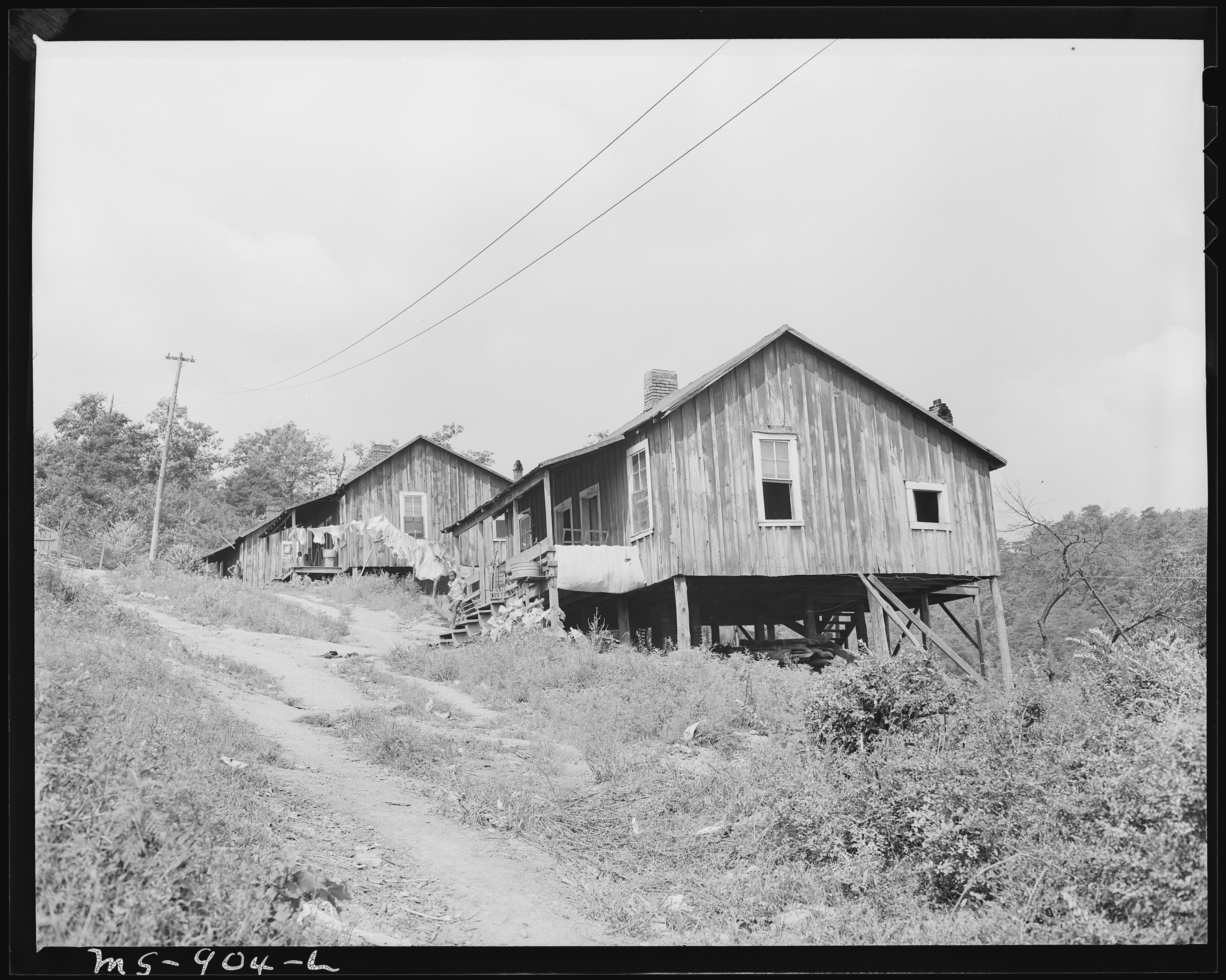
Homes of Black miners in company housing project, 1946

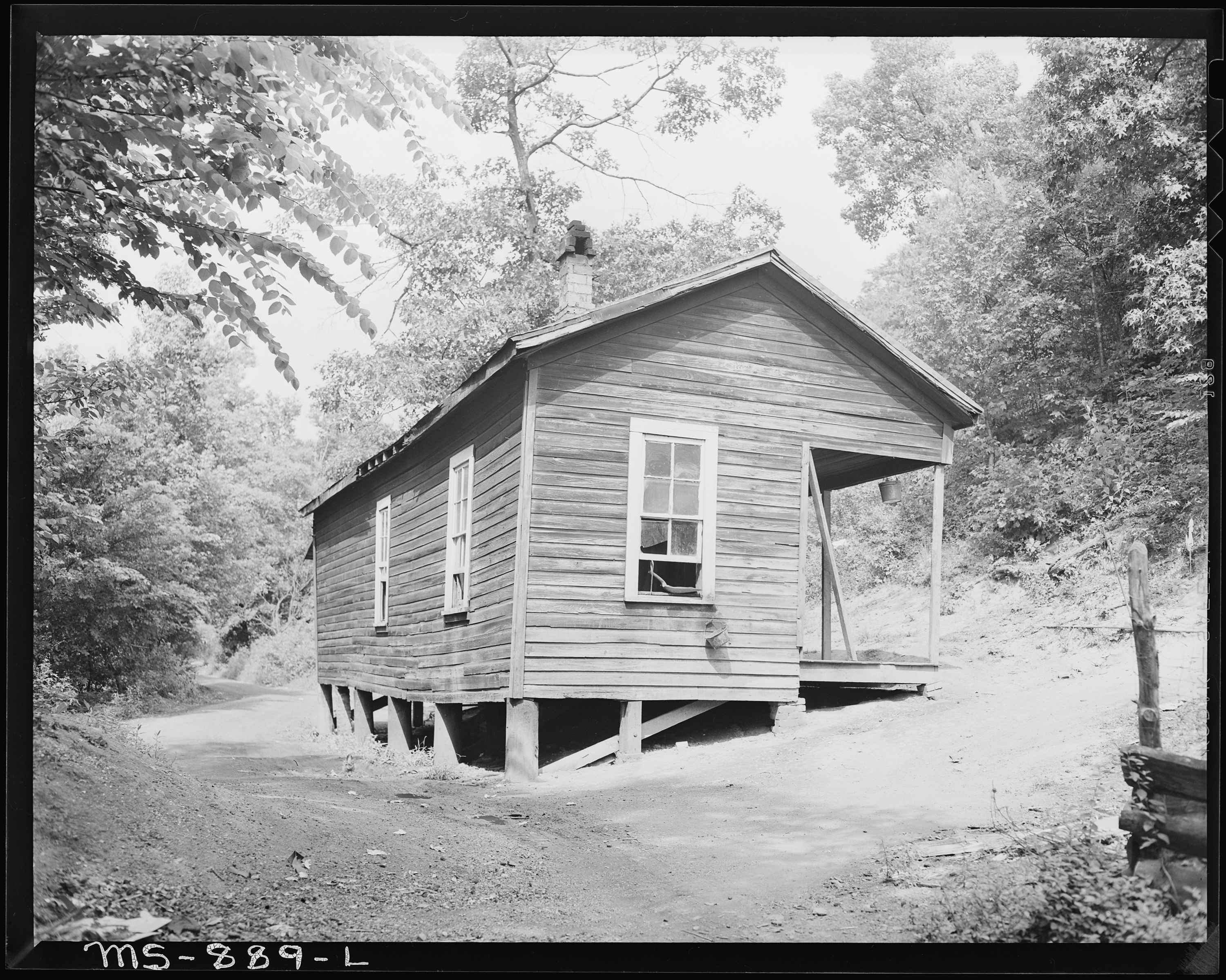
Home of Eddie Cain, Miner, living in company housing project, 1946

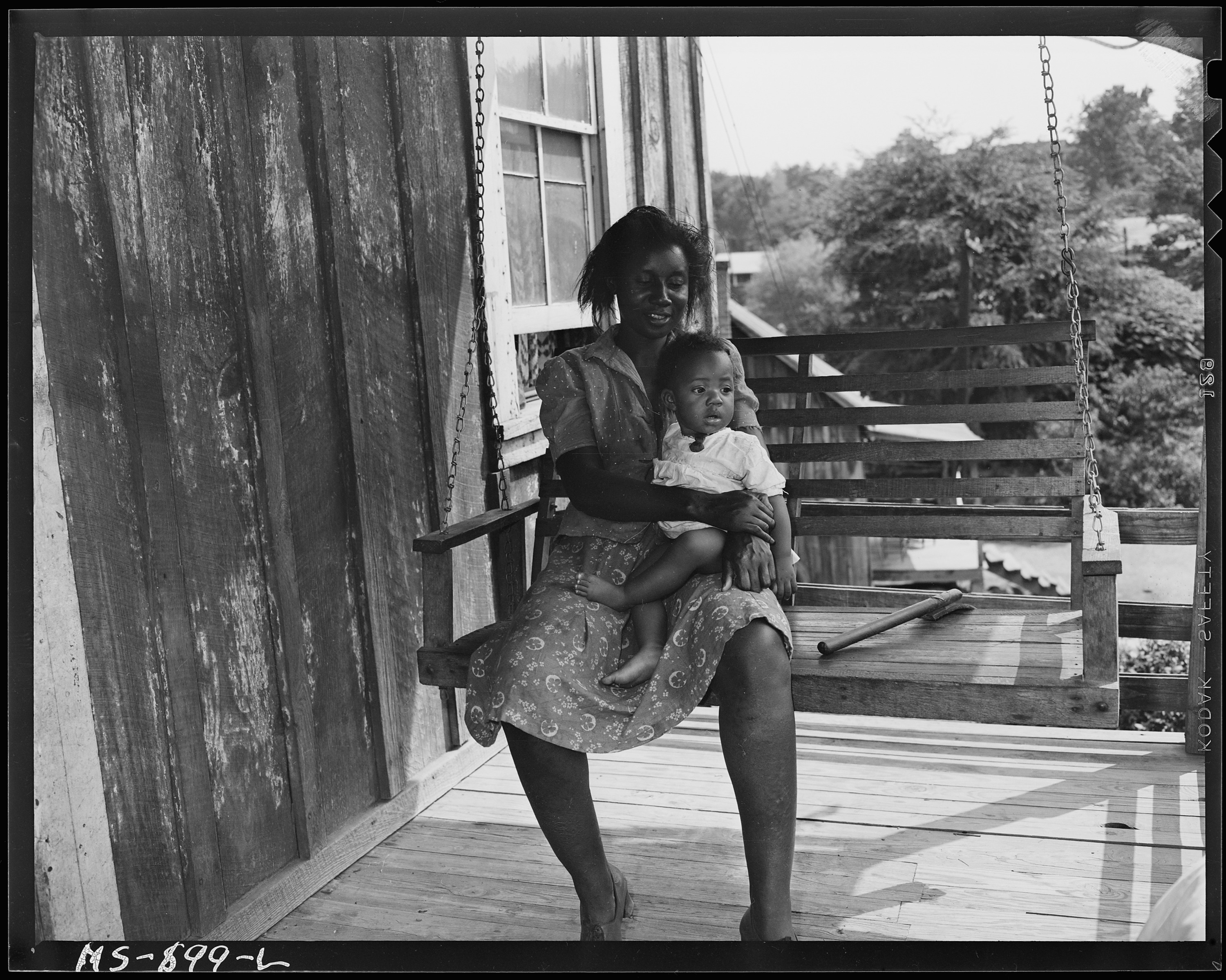
Mrs. Aron Conway and baby swinging on porch of their home, 1946

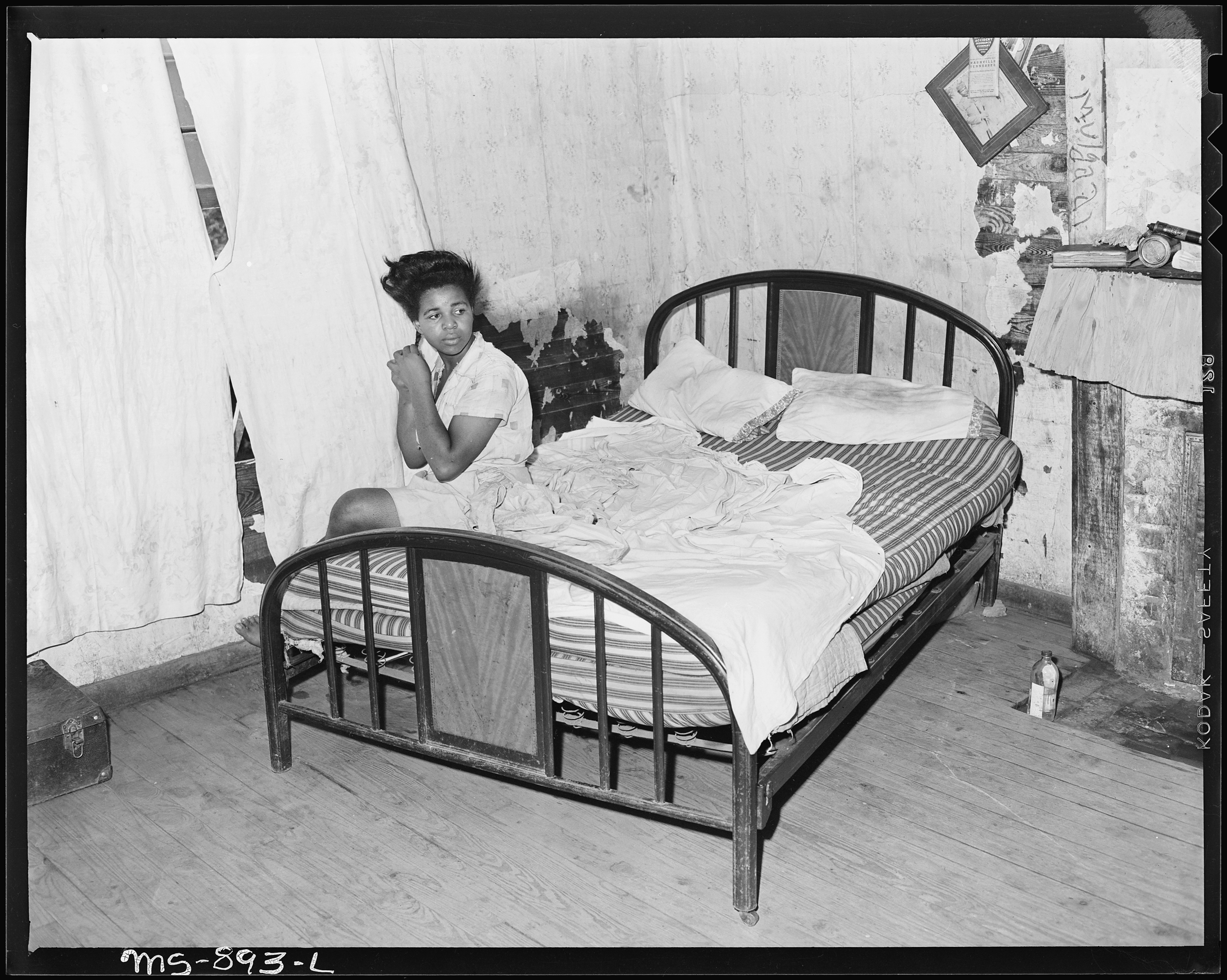
Bedroom of Mining Cabin of Mr. Eddie Cain, 1946

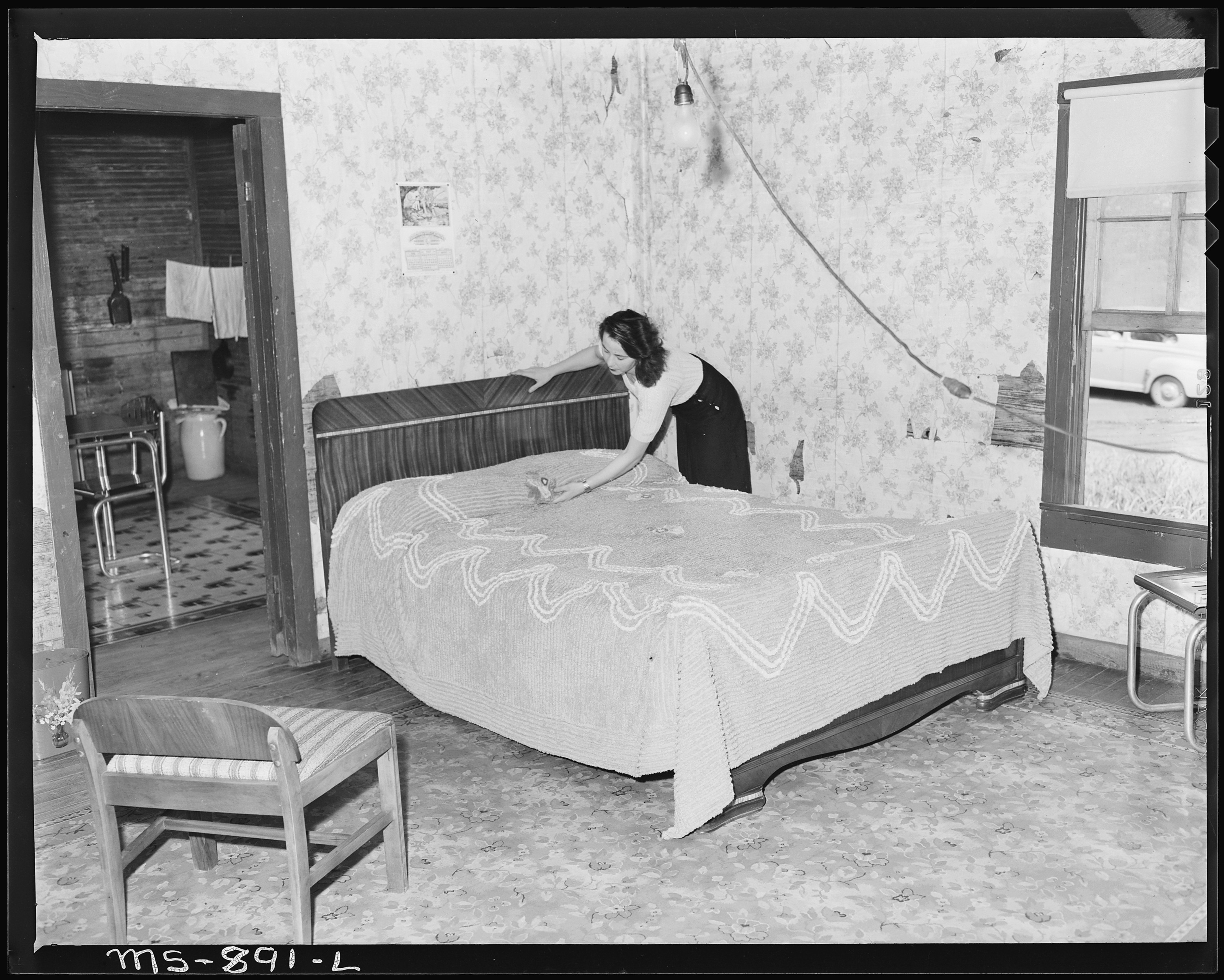
Bedroom of Mining Cabin of Mr. Alvis New, 1946

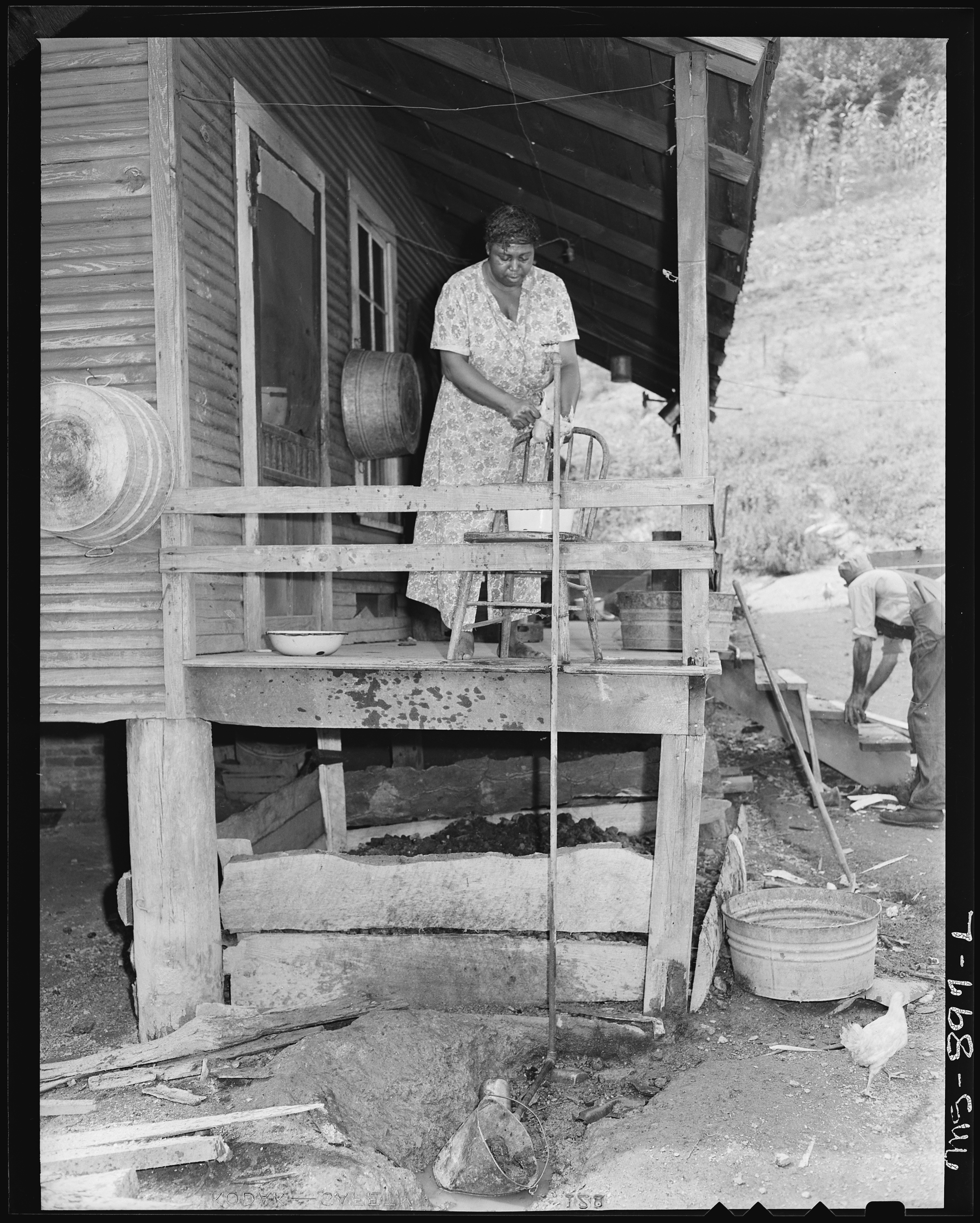
Mrs. Butler Phillips, wife of miner, dressing a chicken on back porch of her home, 1946

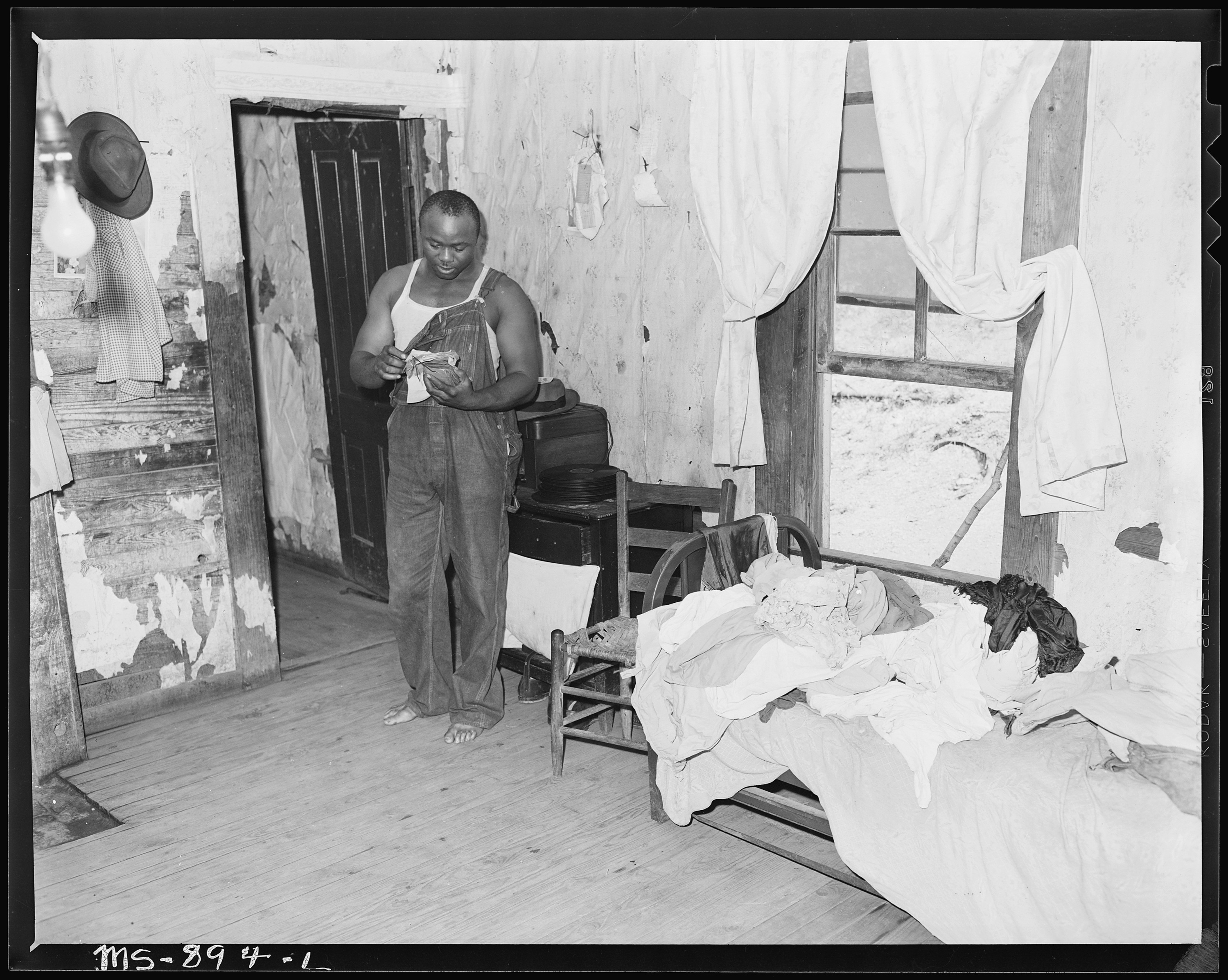
Mr. Eddie Cain, Miner, Looking over his bills in his home, 1946

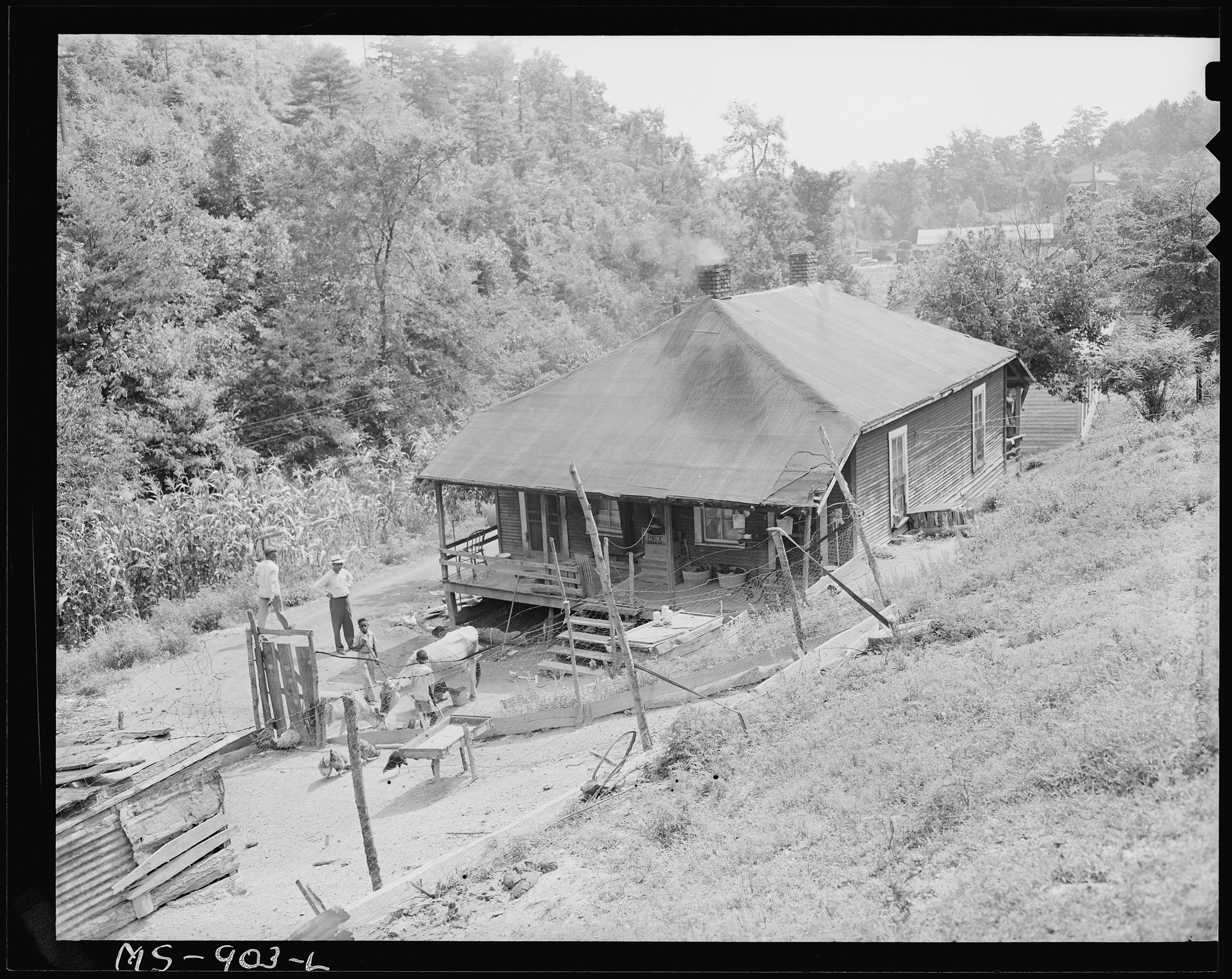
Mining Cabin Home of Mr. Butler Phillips, 1946

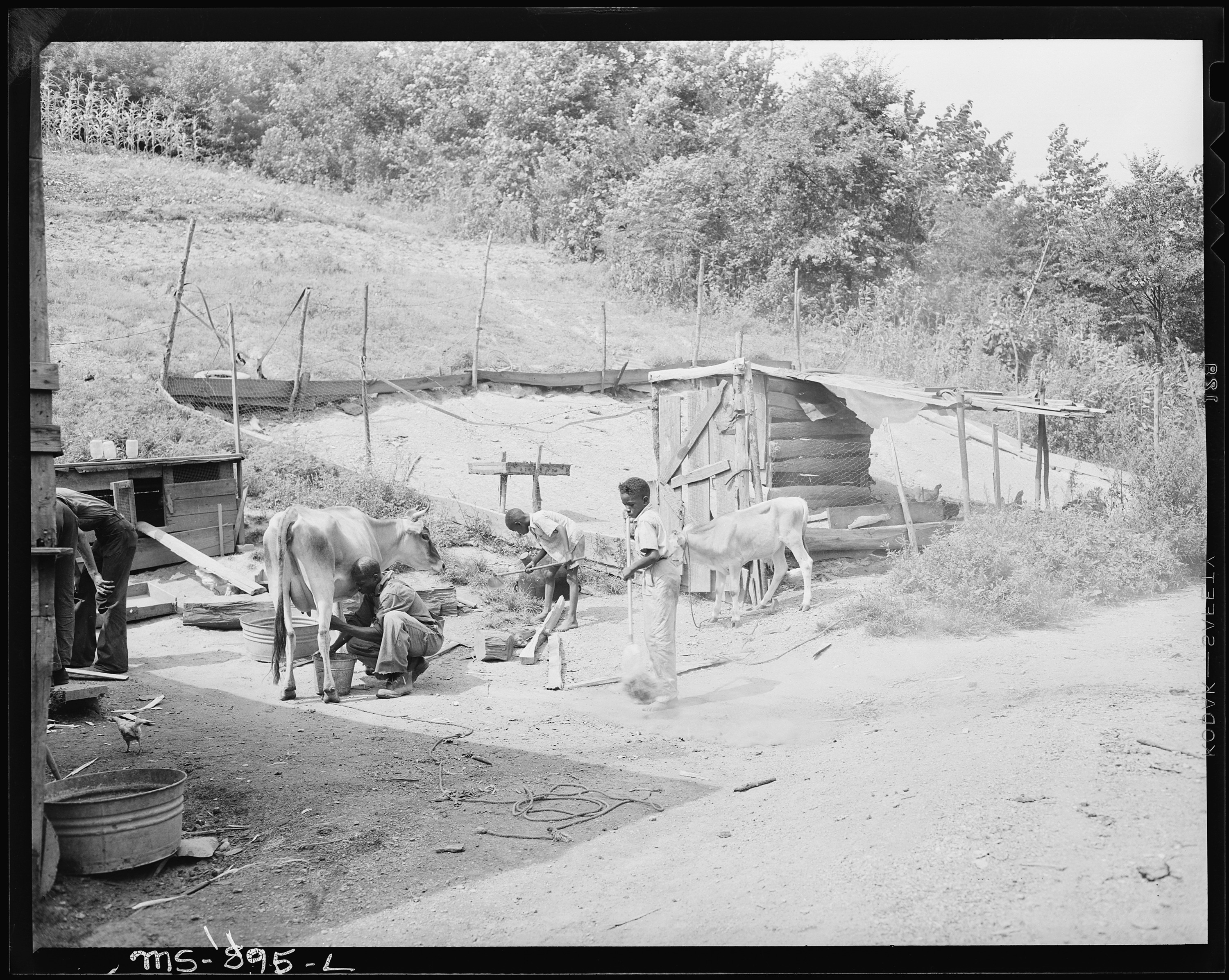
Backyard of home of Butler Phillips with family tending to farm animals, 1946

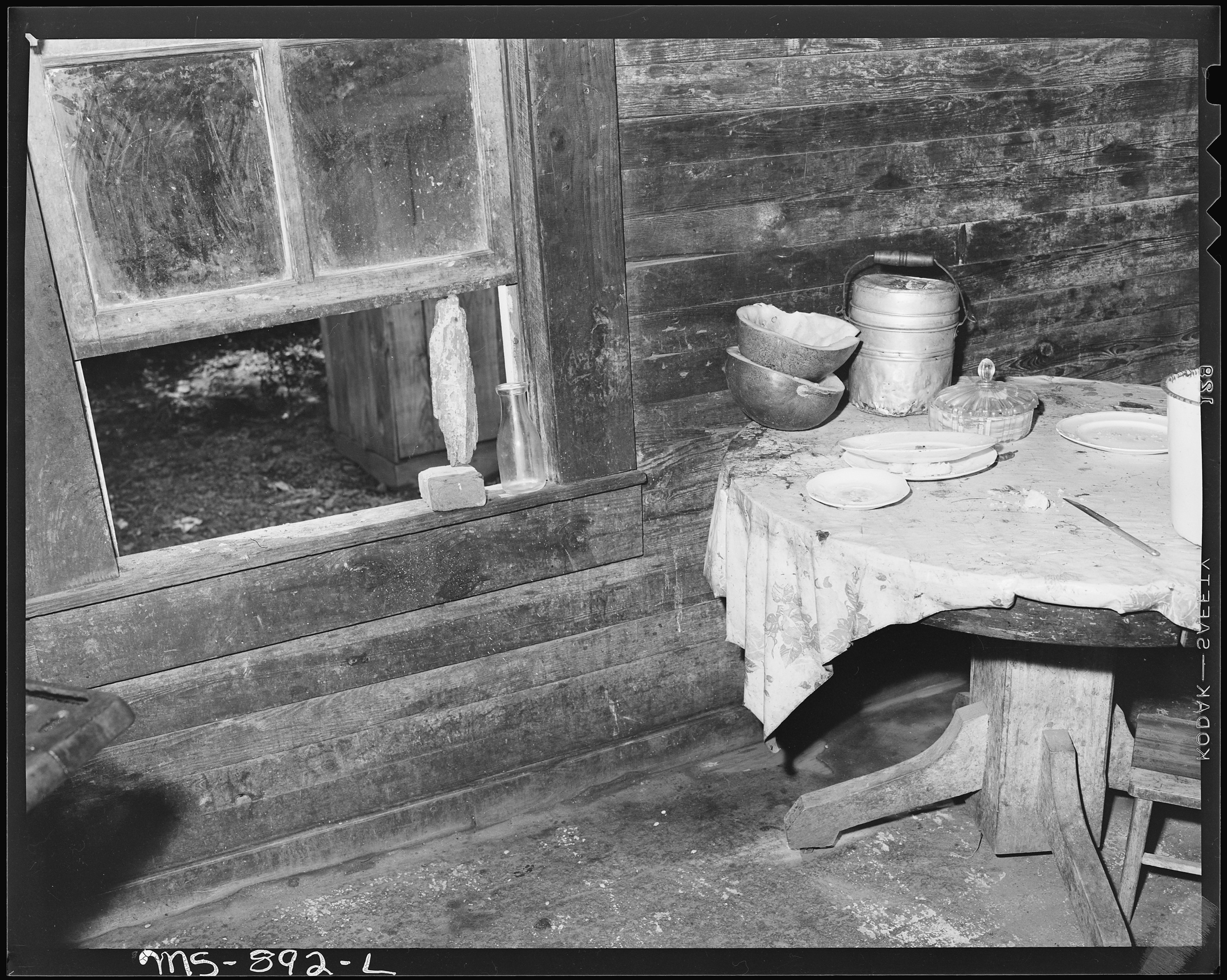
Detail of Cain family kitchen in mining cabin, 1946
