= Jimmy Gardner =

Jimmy Gardner may refer to:

- Jimmy Gardner (ice hockey) (1881–1940), Canadian professional ice hockey forward
- Jimmy Gardner (boxer) (1885–1964), Irish-American boxer
- Jimmy Gardner (actor) (1924–2010), British actor
- Jimmy Gardner (footballer) (born 1967), Scottish footballer

== See also ==
- James Gardner (disambiguation)
