= Paul Tubb =

American football coach and baseball player

Paul H Tubb
Biographical details
- Born: December 28, 1899; Bibb County, Alabama, U.S.
- Died: August 22, 1963 (aged 63); Montgomery, Alabama, U.S.

Playing career

Baseball
- 1924: Alabama

Coaching career (HC unless noted)

Football
- 1927–1935: Dothan HS (AL)
- 1938–1941: Livingston State
- 1942–?: Tuscaloosa HS (AL) (assistant)

Head coaching record
- Overall: 13–12–2 (college)

Paul H. Tubb (December 28, 1899 – August 22, 1963) was an American football coach and baseball player. After serving as team captain for the 1924 Alabama Crimson Tide baseball squad, he played for the Montgomery Lions of the Southeastern League. Once his career as a professional baseball player was over, Tubb started his coaching career.

From 1927 to 1935, Tubb was the head football coach for Dothan High School where he compiled a record of 66–20–4. He then served as the first head football coach at Livingston State Teachers College (now the University of West Alabama) from 1938 through the 1941 season and compiled an overall record of thirteen wins, twelve losses and two ties during his tenure there (13–12–2). Following his tenure at Livingston, Tubb returned to Tuscaloosa where he served as an assistant coach for the Tuscaloosa High School football team.

== Head coaching record ==
=== College ===
Year	Team	Overall	Conference	Standing	Bowl/playoffs
Livingston State Tigers (Alabama Intercollegiate Conference) (1938–1941)
1938	Livingston State	2–2			
1939	Livingston State	4–3–1	2–2	4th	
1940	Livingston State	6–1–1		1st	
1941	Livingston State	1–6			
Livingston State:		13–12–2			
Total:		13–12–2			
National championship Conference title Conference division title or championship game berth
