= James Gardiner the Younger =

James Gardiner the younger (1689 – 24 March 1732) was an Anglican sub-dean of Lincoln, England, as well as a writer and translator.

== Early life ==
Gardiner was the son of James Gardiner, who was Bishop of Lincoln from 1695 to 1705. He entered Emmanuel College, Cambridge in 1695. He proceeded B.A. as sixteenth wrangler in 1699, and was elected fellow of Jesus College in 1700. He became M.A. in 1702.

== Sub-dean and prebendary ==
On 20 April 1704 Gardiner was presented by his father to the mastership of St. John's Hospital, Peterborough, and 29 April of the same year was installed sub-dean of Lincoln Cathedral on the death of Dr. Knighton, and at the same time became prebendary of Asgarby. He is described by Browne Willis as "an extraordinary benefactor to the church of Lincoln, having improved the house belonging to his dignity, rebuilt by his father, so very much that it may be esteemed the best house belonging to the minster."

== Death and epitaph ==
He died at Lincoln, 24 March 1731–2, and was buried in the retrochoir of the cathedral, by the side of his father. His only daughter, Susanna, who had nursed him assiduously, followed him to the grave in little more than a month, 27 April, and was buried in the same grave in which his wife, Dinah, was also buried, 4 September 1734. His monument bears a very lengthy epitaph, which describes him as a man of great suavity of disposition and beneficence, a cultured and popular preacher, and of some success as an author.

== Literary works ==
He translated René Rapin's Of Gardens in 1706, the frontispice of this edition shows his portrait by John Verelst in the age of 25 and dated 1704.

In 1713 Gardiner published two original works, both of which went to a second edition: The Duty of Peace amongst Members of the same State. A Sermon on Rom. xiv. 19, and Practical Exposition of the Beatitudes. He also contributed to the Oxford and Cambridge Miscellany Poems in 1709.
