= Bob Williams (1950s American football coach) =

American football coach

Coaching career (HC unless noted)
- 1952: Livingston State

Head coaching record
- Overall: 4–6

Bob Williams was an American football coach. He served as the head football coach at the Livingston State Teachers College (now the University of West Alabama) in 1952. During his one season there, he compiled an overall record of four wins and six losses (4–6).

== Head coaching record ==
Year	Team	Overall	Conference	Standing	Bowl/playoffs
Livingston State Tigers (Alabama Intercollegiate Conference) (1952)
1952	Livingston State	4–6			
Livingston State:		4–6			
Total:		4–6			
