= Jim Garner (athletic director) =

Biographical details
- Born: August 10, 1943
- Died: April 3, 2007 (aged 63); Tucson, Arizona, U.S.
- Education: Texas Christian University

Administrative career (AD unless noted)
- 1982–1990: Appalachian State
- 1990–1993: Oklahoma State

James Clyde Garner (August 10, 1943 – April 3, 2007) was an American college athletics administrator. Garner served as athletic director at Appalachian State University from 1982 to 1990, and as athletic director at Oklahoma State University–Stillwater from 1990 to 1993. During his time as athletic director at Appalachian State, Garner hired future College Football Hall of Fame coaches Mack Brown and Jerry Moore as head coach of the Mountaineers. Garner is the father-in-law of former NFL kicker Björn Nittmo.
