= James Garner (cricketer) =

English cricketer

Personal information
- Full name: James Peter Garner
- Born: 12 January 1972 (age 54); Tittleshall, Norfolk, England
- Batting: Right-handed
- Role: Wicket-keeper

Domestic team information
- Years: Team
- 1991–2002: Norfolk

Career statistics
Competition	List A
Matches	6
Runs scored	54
Batting average	10.80
100s/50s	–/–
Top score	27
Balls bowled	–
Wickets	–
Bowling average	–
5 wickets in innings	–
10 wickets in match	–
Best bowling	–
Catches/stumpings	3/–
- Source: Cricinfo, 28 June 2011

James Peter Garner (born 27 January 1972) is a former English cricketer. Garner was a right-handed batsman who fielded as a wicket-keeper. He was born in Tittleshall, Norfolk and educated at Felsted School.

Garner made his debut for Norfolk in the 1991 Minor Counties Championship against Hertfordshire. Garner played Minor counties cricket for Norfolk from 1991 to 2002, which included 19 Minor Counties Championship matches and 18 MCCA Knockout Trophy matches. He made his List A debut against Cornwall in the 2000 NatWest Trophy. He made 5 further List A appearances, the last coming against Kent in the 2002 Cheltenham & Gloucester Trophy. In his 6 List A matches, he scored 54 runs at an average of 10.80, with a high score of 27.
