= Jim King (American football) =

American football coach and player

Biographical details
- Born: Adamsville, Alabama, U.S.
- Education: Southern Mississippi

Playing career
- 1963–1964: Southern Miss
- Position: Lineman

Coaching career (HC unless noted)
- 1970–1972: Livingston (assistant)
- 1973–1976: Livingston
- 1977–1978: Auburn (OL)
- 1979–1980: Florida (OL)
- 1981–1983: Wyoming (OL)

Head coaching record
- Overall: 29–14–1

Accomplishments and honors

Awards
- 2x Gulf South Coach of The Year (1974-75)

Jim King was an American football coach and player. He served as the head football coach at Livingston University (now the University of West Alabama) between 1973 and 1976.

== Career ==
King was a member of the Southern Miss Golden Eagles football team from 1963 through 1964 where he played the lineman position. Following his graduation, he served as an offensive line coach at Livingston from 1970 through to 1972. In 1973, he was promoted to head football coach at Livingston and compiled an overall record of 29 wins, 14 two losses and one tie during his four-year tenure there (29–14–1). After his Livingston tenure, King served as an offensive line coach at Auburn, Florida and Wyoming.

== Head coaching record ==
Year	Team	Overall	Conference	Standing	Bowl/playoffs
Livingston Tigers (Gulf South Conference) (1973–1976)
1973	Livingston	6–3–1	4–3–1	5th	
1974	Livingston	8–3	5–3	T–3rd	
1975	Livingston	10–3	6–2	2nd	L NCAA Division II Semifinal
1976	Livingston	5–5	5–3	T–4th	
Livingston:		29–14–1	20–11–1		
Total:		29–14–1			
