= Morris Higginbotham =

American football coach (1925–2011)

Biographical details
- Born: June 6, 1925; Birmingham, Alabama, U.S.
- Died: June 13, 2011 (aged 86); McCalla, Alabama, U.S.
- Education: University of Alabama

Coaching career (HC unless noted)
- 1952: Walnut Grove HS (AL)
- 1953–1957: West Blocton HS (AL)
- 1958: B. B. Comer HS (AL)
- 1959–1961: Enterprise HS (AL)
- 1963–1966: Hueytown HS (AL)
- 1967–1969: Livingston
- 1970–1971: Scottsboro HS (AL)
- 1972–1975: Hewitt-Trussville HS (AL)
- 1978–1981: Hueytown HS (AL)

Head coaching record
- Overall: 19–9–2 (college); 190–73–8 (high school)
- Bowls: 0–1

Morris Higginbotham (June 6, 1925 – June 13, 2011) was a football head coach for numerous Alabama high schools and at Livingston College (now the University of West Alabama) from 1952 through his retirement in 1981.

== Early life ==
Higginbotham was born in Birmingham, Alabama in 1925. Between 1943 and 1946 he served in the United States Army Air Corps as a soldier in World War II. Upon his return, he earned his college from the University of Alabama and began his coaching career in 1952 at Walnut Grove High School.

== Coaching career ==
=== High school ===
In 1952, Higginbotham began his coaching career at Walnut Grove High School, where he compiled a record of seven wins, two losses and one tie (7–2–1) during his lone season there. From 1953 to 1957 he led West Blocton High School to an overall record of 41 wins, six losses and two ties (41–6–2). His tenure there included three undefeated seasons and for his efforts the field bears his name. From West Blocton Higginbotham coached one year at B.B. Comer High School (5–4–1) before he started his three-year tenure at Enterprise High School, where he compiled an overall record of 27 wins, two losses and one tie (27–2–1). From Enterprise, he moved to Hueytown High School, where he compiled a record of 23 wins, 12 losses and three ties (23–12–3) during his first tenure at the school.

After a stint as head coach at Livingston College, Higginbotham returned to high school coaching at Scottsboro High School for two seasons (13–9) and then at Hewitt-Trussville High School from 1972 to 1975 where he compiled a record of 24 wins, 14 losses and one tie (24–14–1). He then concluded his coaching career with his second stint at Hueytown where he compiled a record of 15 wins, 24 losses and one tie (15–24–1) before his retirement after the 1981 season.

In 1993 Higginbotham was inducted into the Alabama High School Sports Hall of Fame in recognition of his career in coaching. In his 27 years as a high school head coach, he compiled an overall record of 190 wins, 73 losses and eight ties (190–73–8) and five state football championships.

=== College ===
In February 1967, Livingston officials announced the hiring of Higginbotham as the Tigers' new head coach. In his second season, Higginbotham led Livingston to an appearance in the inaugural Peanut Bowl at Dothan, but lost to Ouachita Baptist University 39–6 in the game. Following the 1969 season he returned to coach high school football at Scottsboro High School with Mickey Andrews serving as his replacement at Livingston. For his career at Livingston, Higginbotham compiled a record of 19 wins, nine losses and two ties (19–9–2).

== Head coaching record ==
=== College ===
Year	Team	Overall	Conference	Standing	Bowl/playoffs
Livingston Tigers (Alabama Collegiate Conference) (1967–1969)
1967	Livingston	4–5–1	0–2–1	4th	
1968	Livingston	9–2			L Peanut Bowl
1969	Livingston	6–2–1			
Livingston:		19–9–2			
Total:		19–9–2			
