= List of mayors of New Albany, Indiana =

This is a list of mayors of New Albany, Indiana.

#	Name	Term start	Term end	Party
1	P.M. Dorsey	1839	1840	Whig
2	Dr. Shepard Whitman	1840	1843	Whig
3	Silas Overturf (1812–1886; aged 73)	1843	1844	Whig
4	James Collins	1844	1844	Whig
5	William Clark	1844	1847	Whig
6	William M. Weir (1st)	1847	1849	Whig
7	John R. Franklin	1849	1850	Democratic
8	William M. Weir (2nd)	1850	1852	Whig
9	Alexander S. Burnett Sr. (1st)	1852	1853	Democratic
10	Joseph A. Moffatt	1853	1855	Know-Nothing
11	Johnathan D. Kelso	1853	1856	Republican
12	Frankie Warren	1856	1859	None
13	Alexander S. Burnett Sr. (2nd)	1859	1863	Democratic
14	Dumar M. Hooper	1863	1865	Republican
15	William L. Sanderson	1865	1868	Democratic
16	William Hart	1868	1871	Democratic
17	Thomas Kunkle	1871	1874	Democratic
18	William B. Richardson	1874	1877	Democratic
19	S. Milburn	1877	1879	Democratic
20	Bela C. Kent (1821–1904; aged 82)	1879	1883	Republican
21	John J. Richards	1883	1889	Republican
22	Morris McDonald	1889	1892	Republican
23	William A. Broecker	1892	1894	Democratic
24	Thomas W. Armstrong	1894	1898	Republican
25	Edward Crumbo (1840–1905; aged 64)	1898	1902	Democratic
26	Frank L. Shrader (1861–1940; aged 78)	1902	1904	Republican
27	William V. Grose (1840–1923; aged 83)	1904	August 30, 1906	Democratic
28	Jacob Best	1907	1911	Republican
29	Newton Green (1st)	1912	1915	Democratic
30	Robert W. Morris (1858–1949; aged 90)	1916	1927	Republican
31	Newton Green (2nd)	1928	1931	Democratic
32	Charles B. McLinn (1871–1945; aged 74)	1932	1935	Republican
33	Jacob G. Hauswald (1869–?; aged ?)	1936	1939	Democratic
34	Noble F. Mitchell	1940	1942	Republican
35	Robert C. Brooks	1942	1943	Republican
36	Raymond L. Jaegers	1943	September 5, 1946	Republican
–	Edmund K. Scott (1883–1963; aged 79)	September 1946	September 1947	None
37	J. Irvin Streepy (1918–1984; aged 65)	September 1947	1948	Republican
38	C. Pralle Erni (1895–1985; aged 89–90)	1948	1963	Democratic
39	Garnett Inman (1918–1993; aged 75)	1964	1971	Republican
40	Warren V. Nash	1971	1975	Democratic
41	Robert L. Real (1st)	1975	1983	Republican
42	Charles Hunter	1984	1987	Democratic
43	Robert L. Real (2nd)	1987	1991	Republican
44	Douglas B. England (1st) (born in 1944; age 81)	1992	1999	Democratic
45	Regina Overton	2000	2003	Republican
46	James E. Garner Sr.	2004	December 31, 2007	Democratic
47	Douglas B. England (2nd)	January 1, 2008	December 31, 2011	Democratic
48	Jeff M. Gahan (born in 1962; age 62)	January 1, 2012	Present	Democratic

Source: Encyclopedia of Louisville.
