= James Gardiner (bishop) =

Bishop of Lincoln

The Right Reverend James Gardiner
- Bishop of Lincoln
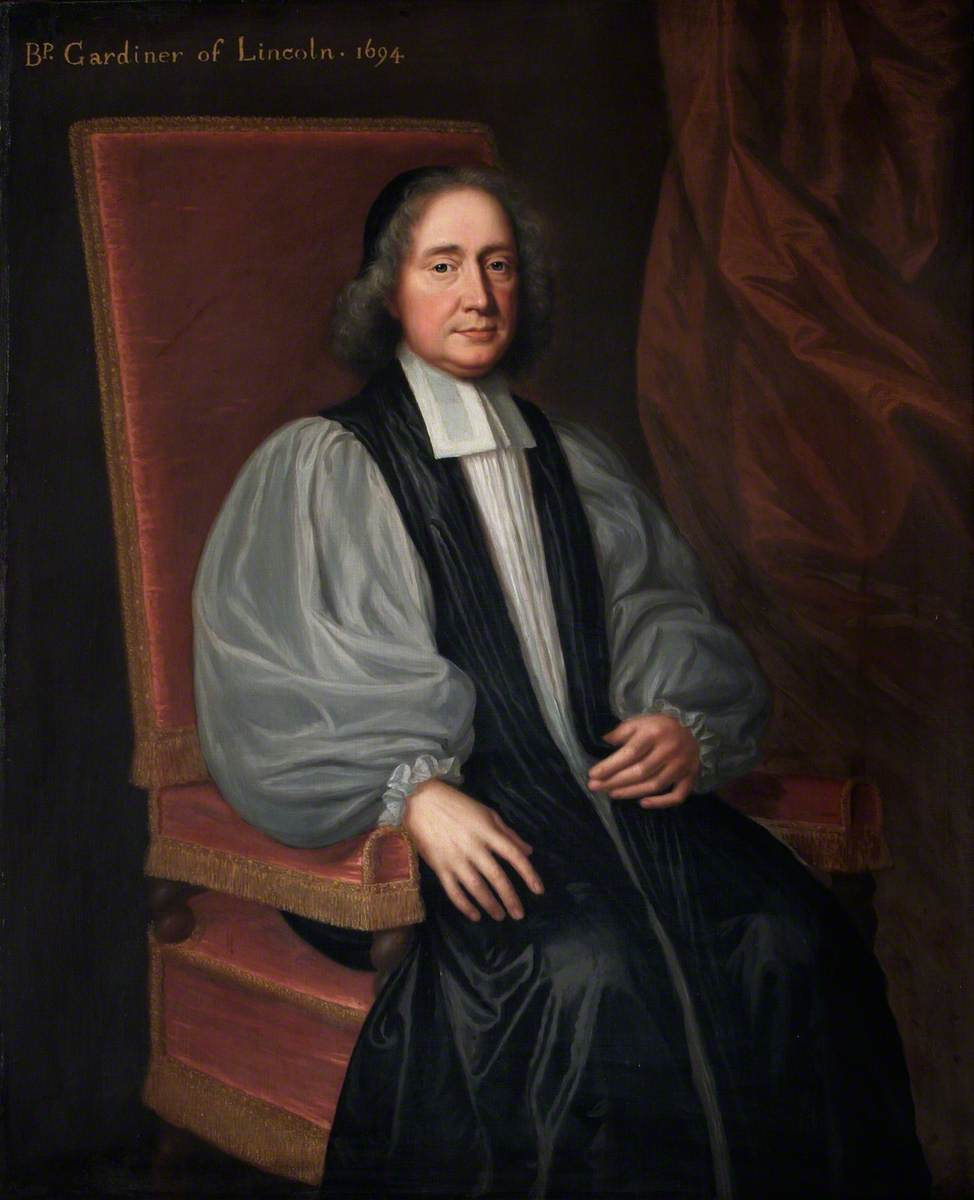
- Church: Church of England
- Diocese: Diocese of Lincoln
- In office: 1695–1705
- Predecessor: Thomas Tenison
- Successor: William Wake

Personal details
- Born: 1637
- Died: 1 March 1705
- Denomination: Anglican
- Education: Emmanuel College, Cambridge

James Gardiner (1637 – 1 March 1705) was an English bishop of Lincoln.

== Life ==
He was the son of Adrian Gardiner, apothecary, of Nottingham. He entered Emmanuel College, Cambridge, in 1649, taking the degrees of B.A. 1652–3, M.A. 1656, and D.D. 1669. On the Restoration he obtained favour at court, became chaplain to the Duke of Monmouth, chaplain to the guards, and received the crown living of Epworth, Lincolnshire.

In 1671 he received the sub-deanery of Lincoln from Thomas Fuller, replacing Robert Mapletoft. While holding this office he rebuilt his official residence, which had been reduced to ruins by the parliamentary forces on the storming of the castle and close in 1644. On the death of Michael Honywood in 1681, he was recommended for the deanery of Lincoln by Archbishop William Sancroft, but unsuccessfully, it having been promised to Daniel Brevint. On the serious illness of the latter in 1685, Gardiner applied to the archbishop for his support for the anticipated vacancy, which, however, did not occur till 1695.

Meanwhile, on the translation of Thomas Tenison from the see of Lincoln to that of Canterbury, Tenison successfully recommended his friend Gardiner as his successor, and Gardiner's was the first consecration performed by the new archbishop, 10 March 1695. His ten years' episcopate was uneventful. A Whig and a low churchman, he voted steadily with his party. He died at his house in Dean's Yard, Westminster, 1 March 1705.

== Works ==
He was an antiquary and assisted Simon Patrick, when Dean of Peterborough, in deciphering and transcribing the charters and muniments of the abbey. He also published twenty sermons left in manuscript by William Outram, of which a second edition was printed in 1797.

== Family ==
In 1677 Gardiner married Anne Hale of Kettlethorpe, Lincolnshire. He was survived by three sons, James Gardiner the younger, William, and Charles, and two daughters.

== Notes ==
Church of England titles
| Preceded by Thomas Tenison | Bishop of Lincoln; 1695–1705 | Succeeded by William Wake |
