= Jim Garner (American football) =

American football player and coach

Biographical details
- Born: Mobile, Alabama, U.S.
- Education: Livingston State

Playing career
- 1949–1951: Livingston State
- Position: Guard

Coaching career (HC unless noted)
- 1960–1966: Livingston State

Head coaching record
- Overall: 22–39–3

Jim Garner was an American football player and coach. Garner played guard at Livingston State College (now the University of West Alabama) from 1949 to 1951. He later served as the head football coach at Livingston State from 1960 through his resignation from the school following the 1966 season. During his tenure there, he compiled an overall record of 22 wins, 39 losses and 3 ties (22–39–3).

== Head coaching record ==
Year	Team	Overall	Conference	Standing	Bowl/playoffs
Livingston State Tigers (Alabama Collegiate Conference) (1960–1966)
1960	Livingston State	1–6–1			
1961	Livingston State	3–6–1			
1962	Livingston State	3–6			
1963	Livingston State	4–5			
1964	Livingston State	3–6–1			
1965	Livingston State	5–4			
1966	Livingston State	3–6	0–3	4th	
Livingston State:		22–39–3			
Total:		22–39–3			
