= James Terry Gardiner =

American sureyor and engineer

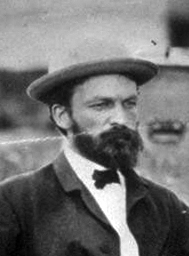
- Born: May 6, 1842; Troy, New York
- Died: September 10, 1912 (aged 70)
- Occupations: surveyor and engineer

James Terry Gardiner (May 6, 1842 – September 10, 1912) was an American surveyor and engineer.

== Biography ==
Gardiner was born in Troy, New York, the son of Daniel Gardiner and Ann Terry Gardiner. He briefly attended Rensselaer Polytechnic Institute and the Sheffield Scientific School. In 1863 he traveled on horseback to California with his boyhood friend, Clarence King. Upon his arrival in San Francisco, he worked for the United States Army Corps of Engineers as a civilian assistant and participated in the construction of fortifications on the coast (later named Fort Mason) and on Angel Island.

In the spring of 1864 Gardiner joined the California Division of Mines and Geology (predecessor of today's California Geological Survey), under the leadership of Josiah Whitney. His friend King was already working with the survey as a field geologist. That summer they participated in the first scientific survey of the Sierra Nevada high country. During the next few years he remained with the survey and traveled through much of California.

In 1867 Gardiner joined the Fortieth Parallel Survey, led by King, and then joined the Hayden Survey in 1872 serving as chief topographer until 1876. Thereafter, Gardiner returned to New York where he was appointed director of the State Survey . From 1880 to 1886 he was also a member of the state board of health and was instrumental in establishing proper sewage systems throughout New York.

Meanwhile, he became involved in the mining industry, writing a report on coal and iron in Colorado (1875); serving as vice-president of the coal companies belonging to the Erie Railroad; and becoming president of the Mexican Coke and Coal Company in 1899.

Gardiner married Josephine Rogers of Oakland, California in 1868. They had a child, Florence (Hall; 1870-1956). She died four years later and in 1881 he married Eliza Greene Doane of Albany, New York. They had five children: Mary Spring (Frazier) (1882-1920), Margaret Doane (Fayerweather)(1883-1958), Doane (1885-1933), Anne Terry (Pier)(1887-?), and Elizabeth Greene Gardiner (1890-1987).

With his father-in-law, Bishop William Croswell Doane, he helped establish the community of Northeast Harbor on Cadillac Island (Mount Desert Island) in Maine. He built a large summer home there in 1883 and named it Ye Haven. It still stands today, known as The Haven. He started a water company, and engineered roads and public utilities. He died there Sept. 10, 1912, aged 70.

Mount Gardiner in Kings Canyon National Park was named in his honor by the California Geological Survey.

The family name had been spelled Gardiner until his father dropped the “i”. James used this form until mid-life when he returned to the earlier spelling.
