= Robert Cire =

American football coach and educator

Biographical details
- Born: March 5, 1924; Donaldsonville, Louisiana, U.S.
- Died: April 10, 2009 (aged 85); Cambridge, Maryland, U.S.
- Education: Delta State University (BA) Columbia University (MA)

Coaching career (HC unless noted)
- 1957–1959: Livingston State

Head coaching record
- Overall: 2–22–1

Robert A. Cire (March 5, 1924 – April 10, 2009) was a football head coach and educator. He was born in Donaldsonville, Louisiana and raised in Greenville, Mississippi before he served in the U.S. Army Air Corps from 1943 to 1946 during World War II. After his service, he earned a degree from Delta State College (now Delta State University) and a master's degree in education from Columbia University in 1950.

After he graduated from college, he took a position at Livingston State College (now the University of West Alabama) He served as the head coach at Livingston State College from 1957 through the 1959 season and compiled an overall record of two wins, 22 losses and one tie during his tenure there (2–22–1).

After coaching at Livingston State College, he became a coach at Hunter College for three years then moving to the City College of New York in 1965. By 1970 he had become an educator and tennis coach at Cambridge-South Dorchester High School and retired in 1986.

== Head coaching record ==
Year	Team	Overall	Conference	Standing	Bowl/playoffs
Livingston State Tigers (Alabama Intercollegiate Conference / Alabama Collegiate Conference) (1957–1959)
1957	Livingston State	1–7			
1958	Livingston State	1–6–1			
1959	Livingston State	0–9			
Livingston State:		2–22–1			
Total:		2–22–1			
