= 49th Test and Evaluation Squadron =

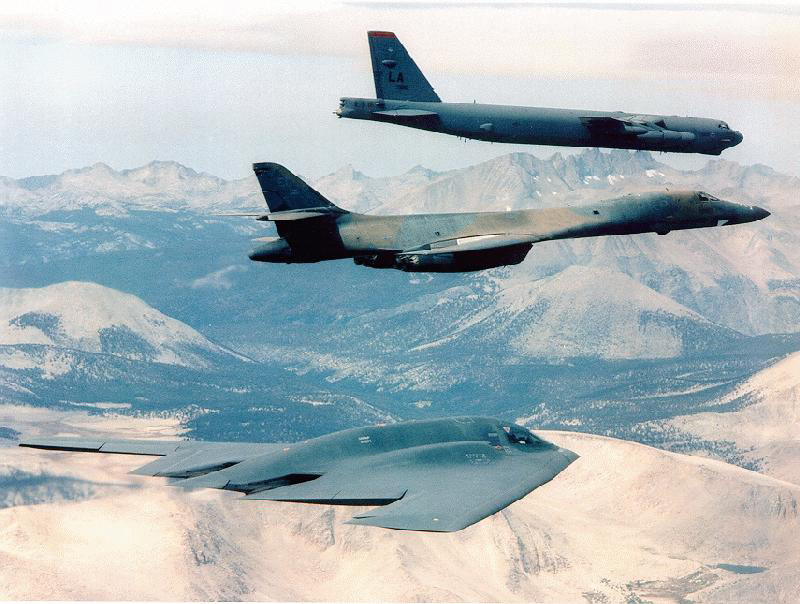
- A United States Air Force B-2 Spirit, B-1B Lancer and B-52 Stratofortress flying in formation
- Active: 1917–1946; 1947–1963; 1986–present
- Country: United States
- Branch: United States Air Force
- Type: Squadron
- Role: Test and evaluation
- Part of: Air Combat Command
- Garrison/HQ: Barksdale Air Force Base, Louisiana.
- Engagements: World War I; World War II – Antisubmarine; World War II – EAME Theater

- Decorations: Distinguished Unit Citation (2x); Air Force Outstanding Unit Award (8x)

Commanders
- Notable commanders: Caleb V. Haynes

Insignia
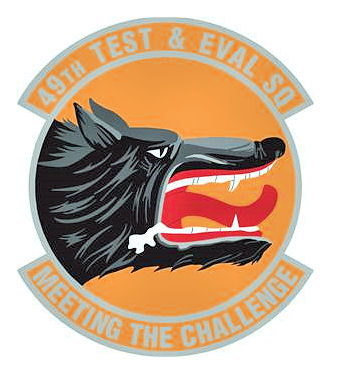
- 49th Test and Evaluation Squadron emblem (Note: Approved 6 October 2000.)

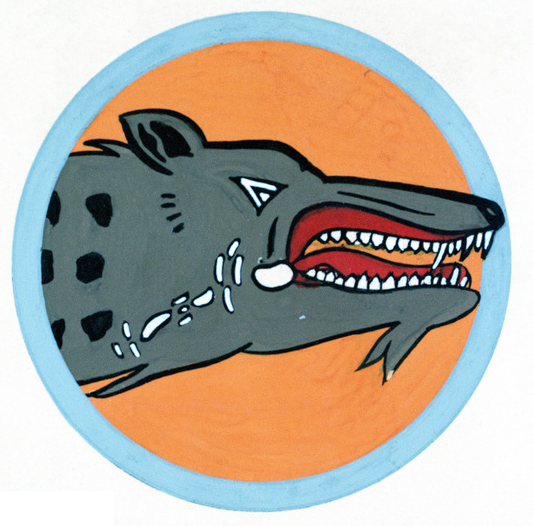
- 49th Bombardment Squadron emblem (Note: Approved 3 March 1924.) (Note: This emblem was based on the emblem approved by the AEF for the 49th Aero Squadron on 19 November 1918)

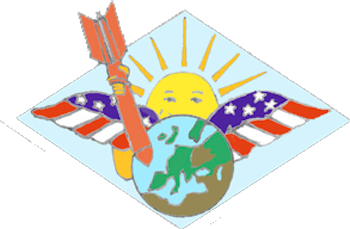
- 166th Aero Squadron emblem (Note: Approved 19 November 1918 by the AEF.)

The 49th Test and Evaluation Squadron is an active United States Air Force unit. Its current assignment is with the 53d Wing, based at Barksdale Air Force Base, Louisiana.

The 49th Test and Evaluation Squadron is an Air Combat Command (ACC) unit tasked to support and conduct operational testing for the B-52. The Squadron is responsible for the conduct of the entirety of B-52 operational test programs. Additionally, the squadron also conducts the Nuclear Weapon System Evaluation Program of the Air Launched Cruise Missile (ALCM). To accomplish its mission, the squadron employs two assigned operational aircraft for operational test via Air Force Global Strike Command.

== History ==
=== World War I ===
==== 49th Aero Squadron ====
Formed at Kelly Field No. 1, San Antonio, Texas on 6 August 1917. During its initial indoctrination training at Kelly Field, many squadron members were reassigned to other squadrons, however on 25 August, personnel from the 68th Aero Squadron were assigned to the 49th. After about a month of basic training as soldiers, the squadron was moved to the newly opened Kelly Field No. 2 where they began training with Curtiss JN-4 Jennys as a school squadron.

Deployed to England in late November 1917, spent six months training with the Royal Flying Corps, then an additional month of training at the Third Aviation Instruction Center at Issoudun Aerodrome, France for combat training.

Equipped with new Spad XIIIs, the 49th began flying operations with the First Army and was credited with participation in the Lorraine, St Mihiel, and the Meuse-Argonne campaigns. During its time in combat, the 49th Aero Squadron downed 25 enemy aircraft, losing six pilots killed, wounded, or missing.

==== 166th Aero Squadron ====
The squadron was organized at Kelly Field, San Antonio, Texas on 18 December 1917. After several days, the squadron was moved to Wilbur Wright Field, Dayton Ohio where it received its first training in the handling of Curtiss JN-4 and Standard J-1 aircraft.

Moved to England in March 1919, spent several months with the Royal Flying Corps being trained. Transferred to the American Expeditionary Forces in France during August 1918. Assigned to the 1st Day Bombardment Group, First Army. Equipped with De Havilland DH-4 and became a Day Bombardment squadron. In combat during the Meuse-Argonne Offensive, 18 October-11 November 1918.

After the 1918 Armistice with Germany, was assigned to the US Third Army, became part of the occupation forces in the German Rhineland, November 1918 – April 1919. Returned to the United States, most squadron personnel demobilized in New York.

=== Inter-War period ===
Remained as part of the Air Service, moved to Ellington Field, Texas in July 1919 and was reformed with new personnel. Participated in demonstrations of effectiveness of aerial bombardment on warships, June–September 1921; mercy mission in relief of marooned inhabitants of islands in the frozen Chesapeake, 9–11 February 1936.

Began its association with testing when it received the first of the five Boeing YB-9, first all-metal monoplane bomber aircraft designed for the United States Army Air Corps, on 14 September 1932. The new bomber proved impossible to intercept during air exercises in May 1932, strengthening calls for improved air defense warning systems. Received the first of 12 Boeing B-17 Flying Fortresses delivered to the U.S. Army Air Corps. Participated in good-will flights to Argentina, 15–27 February 1938, Colombia, 3–12 August 1938, Mexico, 9–15 June 1939, and Brazil, 10–28 November 1939. The trip to Buenos Aires represented the longest distance performance of its kind on record and won the 2nd Bombardment Group the Mackay Trophy in 1938. Following 24 January 1939 Chillán earthquake in Chile, the XB-15, a prototype aircraft that had been assigned to the squadron to test the feasibility of operating very heavy bombers, flew a relief mission carrying medical supplies. Commanded by Major Caleb V. Haynes, the aircraft carried 3,250 lb (1,470 kg) of American Red Cross emergency supplies to Santiago, making only two stops along the way, at France Field in the Panama Canal Zone, and at Lima, Peru. Haynes was awarded the Distinguished Flying Cross and the Order of the Merit of Chile, and the whole crew earned the MacKay Trophy.

The squadron also achieved a well-publicized success on 12 May 1938, when three squadron B-17s, led by group commander Lt. Col. Robert Olds and navigated by 1st Lt. Curtis E. LeMay, a member of the 49th, intercepted the Italian ocean liner Rex over 600 miles at sea during a training exercise.

=== World War II ===
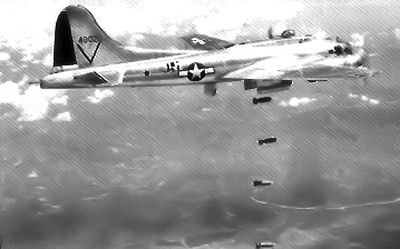
This B-17G was the lead aircraft for the 49th Bombardment Squadron from 23 July 1944 until VE-Day (Note: Aircraft is Lockheed Vega B-17G-45-VE Flying Fortress serial 44-8020. Seen dropping 500-lb RDX bombs just weeks after its arrival in the MTO. the aircraft had its radar 'dustbin' extended, despite the lack of cloud on this particular day. (USAAF Photograph))

During the early stages of the Second World War, the squadron conducted anti-submarine operations on both the Pacific and Atlantic coast prior to being sent to the Mediterranean Theater of Operations. From 28 April 1943 to 1 May 1945, the 49th conducted air operations in both the Mediterranean and European theaters as part of the 2nd Bombardment Group, 5th Bombardment Wing, Fifteenth Air Force stationed at Navarin Airfield, Algeria, flying the Boeing B-17 Flying Fortress. During 1943, the group moved five times: to Chateaudun-du-Rhumel Airfield, Algeria; Ain M'lila Airfield, Algeria; Massicault Airfield, Tunisia; Bizerte, Tunisia; Amendola Airfield, Italy.

Some of the important missions the 49th participated in were: the monastery at Monte Cassino, Italy, on 15 February 1944; enemy troop concentrations at Anzio beachhead on 2 March 1944; and the oil refineries at Ploiești, Romania, throughout the spring of 1944. The last mission was flown on 1 May 1945 against marshalling yards at Salzburg, Austria. On 29 October 1945, the group finally moved to Foggia Airfield, Italy, where it remained as part of the occupation forces and was inactivated on 28 February 1946. By the time the 49th was inactivated, it participated in 412 combat missions flown over Africa, France, Germany, Italy, Austria, Bulgaria, Yugoslavia, Romania, and Hungary.

=== Strategic Air Command ===
The 49th was reactivated on 1 July 1947 at Andrews Field, Maryland. The squadron soon moved to Davis–Monthan Field, Arizona, and received training on the Boeing B-29 Superfortress as part of the new Strategic Air Command long-range strike force. The 49th's first deployment came on 9 August through 16 November 1948 to RAF Lakenheath, England. Upon returning home, the 49th moved to Chatham Air Force Base, Georgia, and added the Boeing B-50 Superfortress to their inventory. In September 1950, the squadron moved to Hunter Air Force Base, Georgia and began flying training missions over the eastern half of the United States. For the next three years the 49th deployed to RAF Mildenhall and RAF Upper Heyford, England, in support of NATO exercises and RAF bombing competitions. Then in February 1954, the squadron entered the "jet age" by receiving the Boeing B-47 Stratojet. Shortly after achieving combat-ready status, aircrews began performing alert and deploying abroad. Overseas deployments included: Sidi Slimane Air Base and Nouasseur Air Base, Morocco; RAF Brize Norton, England; and three different bases throughout Spain. Not only were crews and aircraft performing alert at home, but at various overseas deployment bases also. The alert commitment at home was discontinued with the increase of deployed aircrews and aircraft. Most overseas alert tours would last from three to four weeks compared to the one-week tour alert crews performed during the height of the Cold War. The 49th returned home to perform alert duties during the Cuban Missile Crisis of 1962 before moving to Barksdale Air Force Base, Louisiana. On 1 April 1963, the squadron was inactivated until 1986.

In July 1972, the 4201st Test Squadron was activated with a new mission to conduct operational test and evaluation (OT&E) of the Short Range Attack Missile AGM-69 SRAM. To establish continuing capability for conducting MAJCOM-directed OT&E of strategic airborne weapon systems, the 4201st was designated as a permanent organization in July 1974.

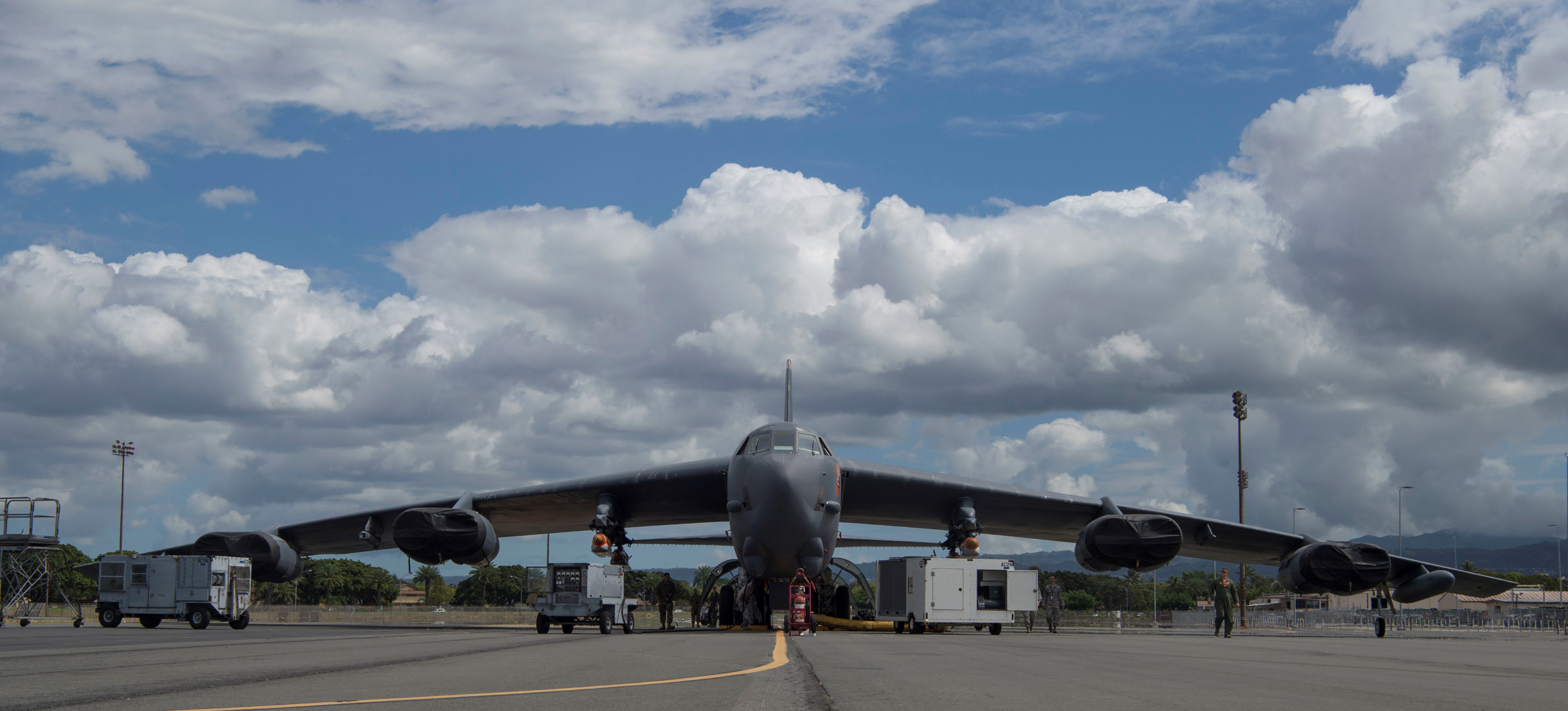
B-52H Stratofortress, 49th Test and Evaluation Squadron carrying Quickstrike-ER (QS-ER) Naval Mines pictured at Joint Base Pearl Harbor-Hickam, Hawaii, 28 May 2019.

At this time, the present location of Barksdale AFB, Louisiana, was established for the squadron to conduct its mission. As part of SAC's initiative to provide combat-rich histories to relatively new organizations, the 4201st was inactivated and replaced by the 49th Test Squadron in July 1986.

=== Post Cold War ===
May 2019 saw the 49th Test and Evaluation Squadron deploy a B-52H to Joint Base Pearl Harbor-Hickam for a demonstration of Quickstrike-ER (QS-ER) naval mines on the Pacific Missile Range Facility, Hawaii. The QS-ER combines Joint Direct Attack Munitions (JDAM) technology and an additional wing kit and battery section with existing mine components. The combination of which allows the QS-ER to be delivered from long range and high altitudes.

The 49th Test and Evaluation Squadron is also involved in the testing of the ADM-160 Miniature Air-Launched Decoy-X (MALD-X) missile and the Conventional Rotary Launcher (CRL) integration of precision-guided munitions.

== Lineage ==
49th Aero Squadron

- Organized as the 49th Aero Squadron on 6 August 1917

Redesignated 49th Aero Squadron (Pursuit) in July 1918
Demobilized on 22 March 1919

- Reconstituted and consolidated with the 49th Bombardment Squadron as the 49th Bombardment Squadronon 16 October 1936

49th Test and Evaluation Squadron

- Organized as the 166th Aero Squadron on 18 December 1917

Redesignated 166th Aero Squadron (Day Bombardment) in August 1918
Redesignated 49th Squadron (Bombardment) on 14 March 1921
Redesignated 49th Bombardment Squadron on 25 January 1923

- Consolidated with the 49th Aero Squadron on 16 October 1936

Redesignated 49th Bombardment Squadron (Heavy) on 6 December 1939
Redesignated 49th Bombardment Squadron, Heavy c. 6 March 1944
Inactivated on 28 February 1946

- Redesignated 49th Bombardment Squadron, Very Heavy on 5 April 1946

Activated on 1 July 1947
Redesignated 49th Bombardment Squadron, Medium on 28 May 1948
Inactivated on 1 April 1963

- Redesignated 49th Test Squadron on 12 February 1986

Activated on 1 July 1986
Redesignated 49th Test and Evaluation Squadron on 20 November 1998

=== Assignments ===
49th Aero Squadron

- Post Headquarters, Kelly Field, 6 August-21 November 1917
- Aviation Concentration Center, 3–23 January 1918
- American Expeditionary Force, 23 January 1918 (attached to the Royal Flying Corps for training, 24 January-28 July 1918, Third Aviation Instruction Center, 2–28 July 1918)
- 3d Pursuit Group, 28 July 1918
- 2d Pursuit Group, 2 August 1918
- 1st Air Depot, AEF, 7 December 1918-Undetermined
- Unknown, Undetermined-22 March 1919

166th Aero Squadron (later 49th Bombardment Squadron)

- Post Headquarters, Kelly Field, 18 December 1917
- Unknown, 24 December 1917
- Aviation Concentration Center, 20 February–5 March 1918 (attached to the Royal Flying Corps for training, 25 March – 7 August 1918)
- Replacement Concentration Center, AEF, 14–18 August 1918
- Air Service Production Center No. 2, AEF, 18–20 August 1918
- 1st Air Depot, AEF, 22–25 August 1918
- 1st Day Bombardment Group, September – 21 November 1918
- Air Service, Third Army, 22 November 1918 – 17 April 1919
- 1st Air Depot, AEF, 17 April – 3 May 1919
- 1st Day Bombardment Group (later 2d Bombardment Group), 18 September 1919 to consolidation in 1936

Detached for operations with 1st Provisional Air Brigade, May – October 1921
Attached to Ordnance Department for service, August 1922 – January 1928

Consolidated Squadron

- 2d Bombardment Group, from consolidation to 28 February 1946 (attached to Newfoundland Base Command, December 1941 – June 1942)
- 2d Bombardment Group, 1 July 1947
- 2d Bombardment Wing, 16 June 1952 – 1 April 1963
- Strategic Air Command, 1 July 1986 (attached to Strategic Air Combat Operations Staff)
- USAF Air Warfare Center, 1 June 1992
- 79th Test and Evaluation Group (later 53d Test and Evaluation Group), 15 April 1993 (Note: On 20 November 1998, the 79th Test and Evaluation Group was inactivated and the squadron was reassigned to the newly activated 53rd Test and Evaluation Group. However, on 25 July 2001, the two groups were consolidated.)
- 753rd Test and Evaluation Group, 1 October 2021 – present

=== Stations ===
49th Aero Squadron

- Kelly Field, Texas, 6 August-28 December 1917
- Castle Bromwich Aerodrome, England, 31 January-24 June 1918

Flight "A" and "C" at Castle Bromwich Aerodrome
Flight "B" at Bicester Aerodrome, Oxford, 31 January-5 April 1918
Flight "D" at Rendcomb Aerodrome, Cirencester, 31 January-5 April 1918

- Issoudun Aerodrome, France, 2 July 1918
- Vaucouleurs Aerodrome, France, 28 July 1918
- Gengault Aerodrome, Toul, France, 2 August 1918
- Belrain Aerodrome, France, 23 September 1918
- Souilly Aerodrome, France, 7 November 1918
- Colombey-les-Belles Airdrome, France, c. 7 December 1918-unknown
- Garden City, New York, March-22 March 1919

166th Aero (later 49th Bombardment) Squadron

- Kelly Field, Texas, 18 December 1917
- Wilbur Wright Field, Ohio, 24 December 1917 – 20 February 1918
- Catterick Airdrome, England, 25 March-7 August 1918
- St. Maixent Replacement Barracks, France, 14–18 August 1918
- Romorantin Aerodrome, France, 18–20 August 1918
- Colombey-les-Belles Airdrome, France, 22–25 August 1918
- Delouze Aerodrome, France, 26 August 1918
- Vinets-sur-Aube Aerodrome, France, 1 September 1918
- Delouze Aerodrome, France, 7 September 1918
- Amanty Airdrome, France, 21 September 1918
- Maulan Aerodrome, France, 25 September 1918
- Julvecourt Aerodrome, France, 22 November 1918
- Trier Airfield, Germany, 5 January 1919
- Colombey-les-Belles Airdrome, France, 17 April 1919
- Le Mans, France, 3 May 1919
- Brest, France, 19 May-3 June 1919
- Mitchel Field, New York, 17 June 1919
- Ellington Field, Texas, July 1919
- Kelly Field, Texas, 26 September 1919

Operated from Langley Field, Virginia, 20 May-26 October 1921

- Langley Field, Virginia, 30 June 1922
- Aberdeen Proving Ground, Maryland, 17 August 1922
- Langley Field, Virginia, 18 January 1928 to consolidation in 1936.

Consolidated Squadron

- Langley Field, Virginia, from consolidation in 1936 to 23 November 1941
- Newfoundland Airport (later RCAF Station Torbay), Newfoundland, 13 December 1941

Air echelon, en route to Newfoundland, arrived Mitchel Field, New York, 1 December 1941
Ordered to west coast for emergency duty, 8 December 1941; operated from Geiger Field, Washington, in conjunction with 12th Reconnaissance Squadron until echelon dissolved in late December 1941

- Argentia Airfield, Newfoundland, 16 January–June 1942
- Langley Field, Virginia, 24 June 1942
- Ephrata, Washington, 29 October 1942
- Lewistown Municipal Airport, Montana, 28 November 1942-c. 13 March 1943
- Navarin Airfield, Algeria, 25 April 1943
- Chateau-dun-du-Rhumel Airfield, Algeria, 27 April 1943
- Ain M'lila Airfield, Algeria, 17 June 1943
- Massicault Airfield, Tunisia, 31 July 1943
- Amendola Airfield, Italy, c. 10 December 1943
- Foggia Airfield, Italy, 29 October 1945 – 28 February 1946
- Andrews Field, Maryland, 1 July 1947
- Davis–Monthan Field (later Davis–Monthan Air Force Base), Arizona, 24 September 1947
- Chatham Air Force Base, Georgia, i May 1949
- Hunter Air Force Base, Georgia, 29 September 1950 – 1 April 1963
- Barksdale Air Force Base, Louisiana, 1 July 1986 – present

=== Aircraft ===
49th Aero Squadron

- Curtiss JN-4, 1917
- SPAD S.XIII, 1918

166th Aero Squadron (later 49th Bombardment Squadron)

- Curtiss JN-4, 1917
- Standard J-1, 1917
- De Havilland DH-4, 1918–1919
- Included DH-4, Caproni bomber, and MB-2 (NBS-1), during period 1919–1929
- Included LB-5, LB-7, B-3, and B-5 during period 1928–1932
- In addition to B-6, c. 1931–1936, included Y1B-9 during period 1932–1936

Consolidated squadron

- In addition to B-10, B-17, and B-18, included A-20, XB-15, and B-23, during period 1936–1942
- Boeing B-17 Flying Fortress, 1942–1945
- Boeing B-29 Superfortress, 1947–1950
- Boeing B-50 Superfortress, 1949–1954
- Boeing B-47 Stratojet, 1954–1963
- B-52G 1986–1992
- B-52H 1992–present

== See also ==
- Boeing B-17 Flying Fortress Units of the Mediterranean Theater of Operations
- List of American aero squadrons
- List of B-29 Superfortress operators
- List of B-47 units of the United States Air Force
- List of B-52 Units of the United States Air Force
- Ora McMurry
