= 11th Aero Squadron =

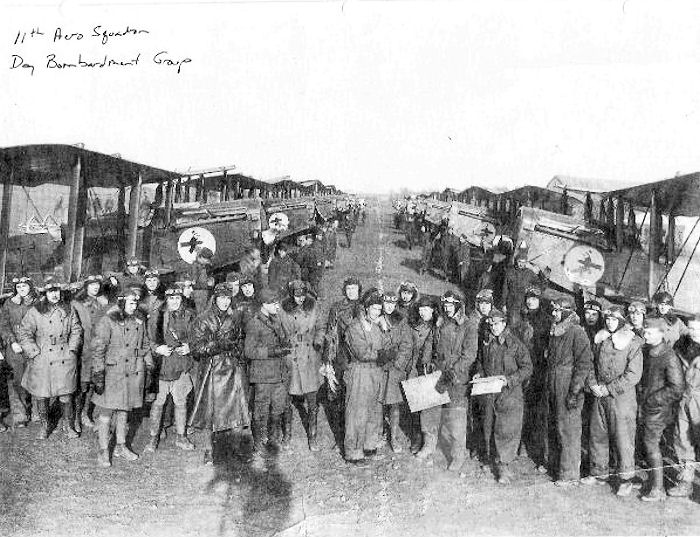
- 11th Aero Squadron posing with its Dayton-Wright DH-4s (Note "Mr Jiggs" on each fuselage), Maulan Airdrome, France, November 1918
- Active: 26 June 1917 – 14 March 1921
- Country: United States
- Branch: United States Army Air Service
- Type: Squadron
- Role: Day Bombardment
- Part of: American Expeditionary Forces (AEF)
- Engagements: World War I

Commanders
- Notable commanders: Capt. Charles L. Heater

Insignia
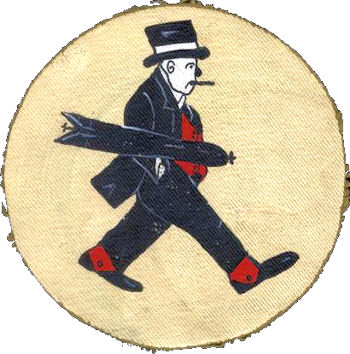
- 11th Aero Squadron Emblem

Aircraft flown
- Bomber: Dayton-Wright DH-4, 1918–1919
- Trainer: Curtiss JN-4, 1917; Standard J-1, 1917

Service record
- Operations: 1st Day Bombardment Group; Western Front, France: 5 September-11 November 1918: Sorties: 576; Combat missions: 26; Enemy combats: 17; Killed: Wounded: Missing: 14; Aircraft lost: 12
- Victories: Enemy Aircraft shot down: 13; Enemy Balloons shot down: 0; Total Enemy Aircraft Destroyed: 13

The 11th Aero Squadron was a United States Army Air Service unit that fought on the Western Front during World War I.

The squadron was assigned as a Day Bombardment Squadron, performing long-range bombing attacks on roads and railroads; destruction of materiel and massed troop formations behind enemy lines. It also performed strategic reconnaissance over enemy-controlled territory, and tactical bombing attacks on enemy forces in support of Army offensive operations. After the 1918 Armistice with Germany, the squadron returned to the United States in May 1919 and became part of the permanent United States Army Air Service in 1921, being re-designated as the 11th Squadron (Bombardment).

The 11th earned battle honors for the Lorraine, St. Mihiel, and Meuse-Argonne Offensives. George McManus, creator of the Mr. Jiggs in his syndicated comic strip, Bringing Up Father, was a member of the squadron and designer of the squadron insignia, a mischievous Jiggs expressing devilment and hustling along with a bomb under one arm.

The current United States Air Force unit which holds its lineage and history is the 11th Bomb Squadron, assigned to the 2d Operations Group, Barksdale Air Force Base, Louisiana.

== History ==
=== Origins ===
The 11th Aero Squadron was organized at Kelly Field, Texas on 26 June 1917. It was initially formed as 2d Company B, Provisional Aviation School Squadron. After initial training in drill and basic soldiering, the squadron was ordered to Scott Field, Illinois on 10 August 1917. At Scott Field, the 11th was assigned to assemble and train on Curtiss JN-4D and Standard J-1 trainers. After three and a half months, orders for overseas duty were received and on 6 December and moved to the Aviation Concentration Center, Garden City, New York. After a week of preparation, the squadron sailed on the RMS Orduna on 17 December, arriving at Glasgow, Scotland on 31 December. It boarded a train at Glasgow and proceeded to the American Rest Camp, Winchester, England on 1 January 1918.

=== Training in England ===
At Winchester, the 11th was attached to the British Royal Flying Corps for technical training prior to being sent to combat in France. A and D Flights were sent to the RFC No. 1 Training Depot Station (No 1 T.D.S) at RFC Stamford, Lincolnshire; B Flight was sent to No. 10 T.D.S at RFC Harling Road, Norfolk, and C Flight to No. 7 T.D.S, RFC Feltwell, Norfolk. At these stations, personnel received training on maintaining various English and French aircraft being used at the front. On 1 May, the squadron was re-assembled at No 1 T.D.S at Stamford and began a period of advanced training and began instructional duty for newly assigned Air Service personnel. On 24 June, it was moved to RFC Waddington, Lincolnshire, where again they acted as instructors for newly assigned Air Service units. A final move to Winchester was made on 7 August where the squadron received its final inspection by the RFC and was issued some basic equipment prior to its move to France.

=== Combat in France ===
It crossed the English Channel on 13 August, arriving at the port of Le Havre, where it boarded a troop train arriving at the Air Service Replacement Concentration Barracks, Saint Maixent, on the 14th. After a stay of five days for final equipment issue, the 11th Aero Squadron was moved to the "Zone of Advance" (the Western Front), transiting through the Air Service Production Center No. 2, at Romorantin, before reaching Delouze Aerodrome. There the 11th was designated as a Day Bombardment squadron, and to be assigned to the 1st Day Bombardment Group when it was formed on next 10 September. On 1 September 1918, seven teams of pilots and observers/bombardiers reported, ferrying a complement of American-built Dayton-Wright DH-4 aircraft from the 1st Air Depot at Colombey-les-Belles Airdrome. A period of time was spent giving the DH-4s a through overhauling, before proceeding to Amanty Airdrome on 6 September where the squadron was organized into a combat unit and familiarization flights were made. Another move to Maulan Aerodrome on 24 September was made which would be where the 11th AS would enter combat.

The first combat mission was flown on 26 September when a formation of nine aircraft crossed enemy lines on a bombing raid on Etain, flying at 12,000 feet. The raid was assessed as being very successful, and all the US aircraft returned to Maulan. The 11th didn't carry out a raid again until 2 October, although several of its flying crews were loaned to the 96th Aero Squadron to operate that unit's Breguet XIVs. On 1 October the 11th and 20th Aero Squadrons experimented with a large combined formation, with each unit forming one arm of a "V"; the 11th formed the left arm and the 20th the right arm. However the 11th was having severe problems with the Liberty V-12 engines of its DH-4s and the formation broke up shortly after and the raid was abandoned.

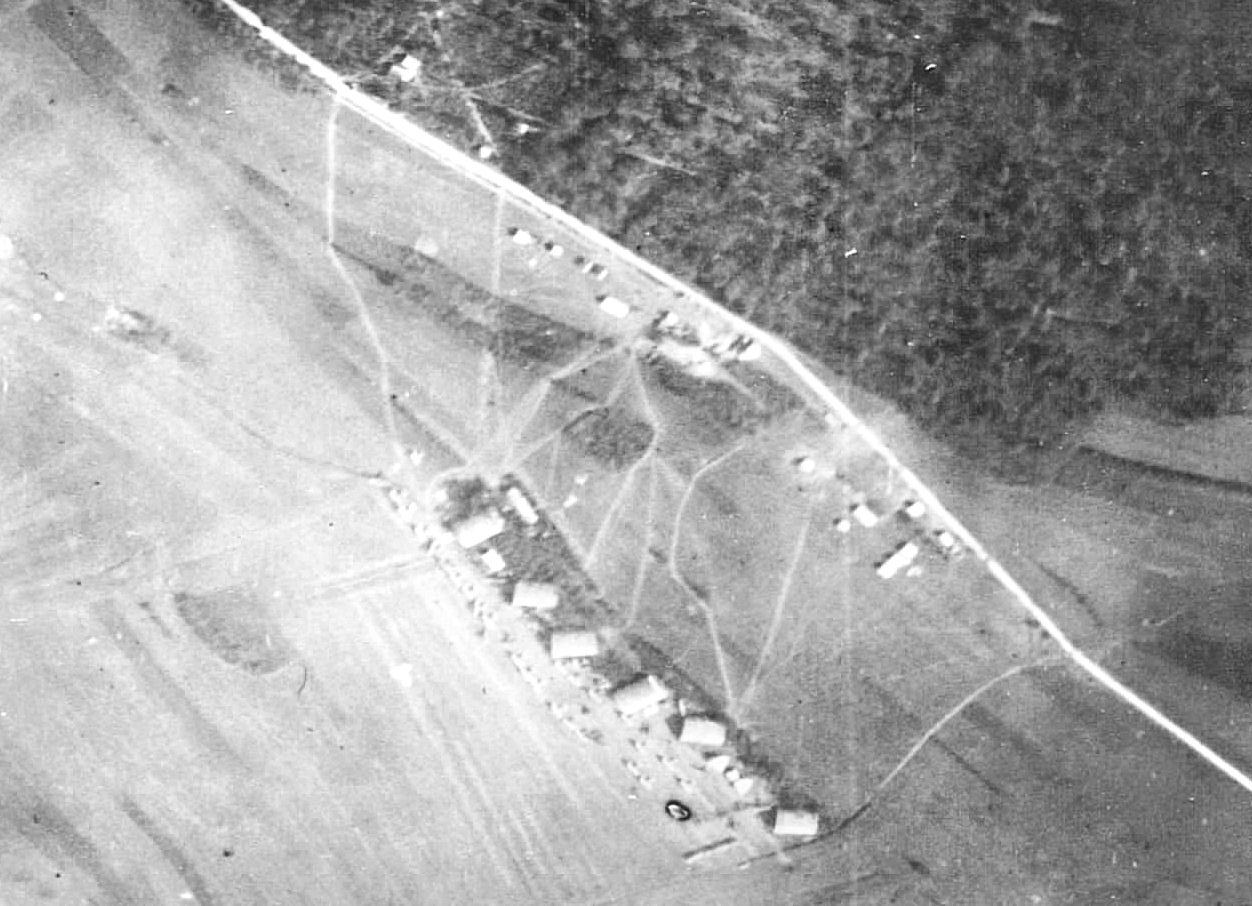
Maulan Aerodrome, France. Note the six tent and frame hangars at the airfield, with the squadrons' DH-4s lined up in front. Trails made by vehicles in the field show the routes taken to the station area and personnel tents along the road to Maulan

The squadron's next combat mission was a bombing raid on Saint-Juvin on 2 October. The bombing was assessed as successful, and all the squadron aircraft returned to Maulan. On 4 October, a successful afternoon raid on Doulcon was carried out by the 11th and 20th Aero Squadrons. On 5 October the squadron bombed Aincreville from 15,000 feet with six airplanes. 6 October saw eight aircraft from the squadron raided Doulcon, about 45 km north west of Verdun, in a trial of low-level bombing from 4,000 feet. Although the DH-4s experienced heavy fire from ground machine guns, no enemy aircraft were seen and all the US aircraft returned.

The squadron's next raid was three days later, on 9 October, when seven DH-4s bombed Saint-Juvin from 10,000 feet. The next day, the squadron carried out a morning raid on the railway yards at Milly-sur-Bradon on 10 October from 12,000 feet and returned safely. The afternoon saw another raid on Milly-sur-Bradon, which was bombed from 11,500 feet by eight aircraft. A third raid on Milly-sur-Bradon was ordered in the late afternoon, and the DH-4s were made ready, but the operation was cancelled before takeoff. On 18 October, eleven DH-4s bombed Bayonville though mist. On 23 October the squadron took part in a combined group raid on Buzancy when five Fokkers were seen near Bayonville, followed by another five Fokkers and one Albatross south of Buzancy. One enemy aircraft went down 'out of control' near Imecourt. A German aerodrome between Barricourt and Bayonville was visited by 10 squadron DH-4s on 31 October, and the formation was attacked by ten Fokkers over Tailly. The 11th also bombed Martincourt on 3 November.

On 4 November 12 aircraft took off to bomb Cheveney le Château from 12,000 feet. Three aircraft were forced to turn back with engine problems before the formation reached the Lines. Back at Maulan, 1Lt Cyrus J Gatton, from Bozeman, Montana, a flight commander and veteran of 12 missions with the French and 13 with the Air Service, and 2Lt G E Bures, a four-mission veteran from Cicero, Illinois, both of whom had just returned to the squadron from leave, volunteered to reinforce the raiders. Five minutes after the departure of the main formation, they took off from Maulan in another DH-4 and endeavored to catch up with the formation, only to be shot down when in sight of the main body, probably by flak. Both airmen were killed.

After bombing, the formation was attacked by about twenty Fokker D VIIs from Jagdgeschwader 1's Jasta 11, one of which was flown by Ltn Friedrich Noltenius, an ace then credited with 20 victories. Noltenius concentrated on AS 32905, flown by 1Lt Dana E. Coates with 2Lt Loren R. Thrall as observer, and hit the fuel tank, setting the aircraft on fire. It was Noltenius's 21st, and last, victory of the War. The DH-4 crashed near the town of Stenay and the crew was killed; they were buried by French civilians. (Although the DH-4 was nicknamed 'The Flaming Coffin', only eight of the 33 Air Service DH-4s lost to enemy action were shot down in flames.)

A raid on Mouzon by the 11th Aero Squadron on 5 November was abandoned due to adverse weather; it was the squadron's last operation of the War. The Armistice came into effect at 11.00 (Allied time) on 11 November 1918. In combat, the 11th Aero Squadron made 32 bombing raids, engaged in 17 combats, and credited with 13 victories. The squadron suffered 20 casualties: 10 killed, 1 wounded, 8 prisoners, and 1 missing in action.

=== Demobilization ===
With the sudden end of combat, the Air Service was slow to return its personnel back to the United States. The 11th Aero Squadron initially remained at Maulan Airdrome until mid-January 1919 when orders were received for the squadron to report to the 1st Air Depot, Colombey-les-Belles Airdrome to turn in all of its supplies and equipment and was relieved from duty with the AEF. The squadron's DH-4 aircraft were delivered to the Air Service Production Center No. 2. at Romorantin Aerodrome, and there, practically all of the pilots and observers were detached from the squadron.

Personnel were subsequently assigned to the commanding general, services of supply, and ordered to report to one of several staging camps in France . The 11th was moved to several stations for the next several months while awaiting scheduling to report to one of the base ports in France for transport to the United States and subsequent demobilization.

Finally on 16 April, it was ordered to proceed to the port of Bordeaux, where it boarded a troop ship for the voyage back to the United States. Leaving on 21 April 1919, it arrived in the Port of New York City about 30 April where it transferred to Camp Mills, Long Island the next day. There most of the men of the 11th Aero Squadron were demobilized, and returned to civilian life.

=== Lineage ===
- Organized as 11th Aero Squadron on 26 June 1917

Re-designated: 11th Aero Squadron (Day Bombardment), 26 August 1918
Re-designated: 11th Squadron (Bombardment) on 14 March 1921

=== Assignments ===
- Post Headquarters, Kelly Field, 26 June 1917
- Post Headquarters, Scott Field, 12 August 1917
- Aviation Concentration Center, 6 December 1917
- Air Service Headquarters, AEF, British Isles, 1 January 1918

Attached to the Royal Flying Corps for training, 1 January-13 August 1918

- Air Service Replacement Concentration Barracks, AEF, France, 14 August 1918
- Air Service Production Center No. 2, 20 August 1918
- First Army Air Service, 26 August 1918
- 1st Day Bombardment Group, 10 September 1918 (First Army until 17 December ?)
- 1st Air Depot, 17 January 1919
- Commanding General, Services of Supply, 1 February 1919
- Post Headquarters, Camp Mills, 1 May 1919

=== Stations ===
- Kelly Field, Texas, 26 June 1917
- Scott Field, Illinois, 12 August 1917
- Aviation Concentration Center, Garden City, New York, 6 December 1917
- Port of Entry, Hoboken, New Jersey

Overseas Transport: RMS Orduna, 18–31 December 1917

- Glasgow, Scotland, 31 December 1917
- Winchester, England, 1 January 1918

Flight A, D detached to: RFC Stamford, England
Flight B detached to: RFC Harling Road, England
Flight C detached to: RFC Feltwell, England

- RFC Stamford, England, 1 May 1918
- Winchester, England, 7 August 1918
- Le Havre, France, 13 August 1918
- St. Maixent Replacement Barracks, France, 14 August 1918
- Romorantin Aerodrome, France, 20 August 1918
- Delouze Aerodrome, France, 26 August 1918
- Amanty Aerodrome, France, 6 September 1918
- Maulan Aerodrome, France, 24 September 1918
- Colombey-les-Belles Airdrome, France, 17 January 1919
- Guitres, France, 1 February 1919
- St Denis de Pile, France, 19 February 1919
- Sablons, France, 9 March 1919
- Libourne, France, 13 April 1919
- Bordeaux, France, 16–21 Apr 1919
- Camp Mills, New York, 1 May 1919

=== Combat sectors and campaigns ===
Streamer	Sector/Campaign	Dates	Notes
	St. Mihiel Offensive Campaign	14–16 September 1918	
	Toul Sector	17–23 September 1918	
	Meuse-Argonne Offensive Campaign	26 September-11 November 1918	

=== Notable personnel ===
- Lt. Ramon H. Guthrie, SSC, 4 aerial victories
- Lt. Sigbert A. G. Norris, DSC, 3 aerial victories
- Lt. Vincent P. Oatis, SSC, 4 aerial victories
- Lt. Richard Wilson Steele, DSC, 1 aerial victory
- Lt. William W. Waring, DSC, 1 aerial victory
- Lt. Edward T. Comegys, KIA 19 September 1918 (Buried at Arlington) 1 aerial victory

DSC: Distinguished Service Cross; SSC: Silver Star Citation KIA: Killed In Action

== See also ==
- Organization of the Air Service of the American Expeditionary Force
- List of American aero squadrons
