= 20th Aero Squadron =

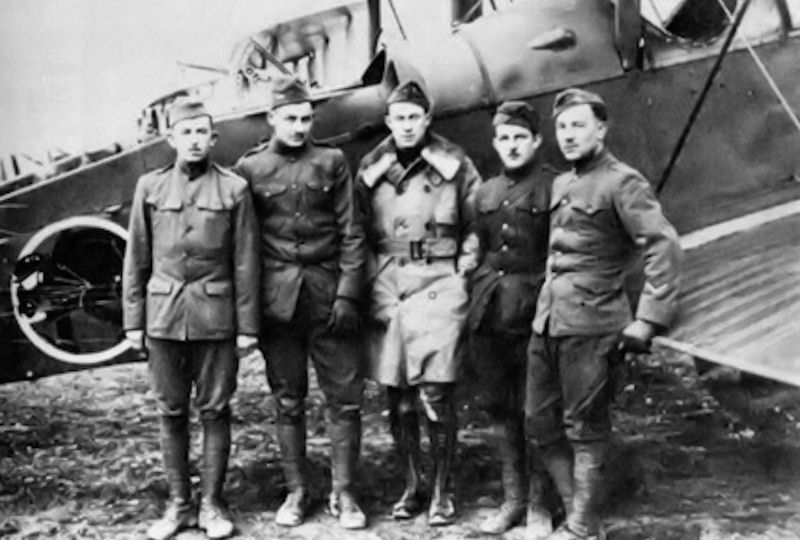
- 20th Aero Squadron Lieutenant Leslie P. Koepfgen with his crew. From the left: Howard W. Wolf, Marion Lappin, Koepfgen, James W. Mone and Earl G. Crain with Koepfgen's Airco DH.4. Koepfgen served four months as flight commander of the 20th Aero Squadron. He was cited for bravery in action by General John J. Pershing.
- Active: 26 June 1917 – Present
- Country: United States
- Branch: United States Army Air Service
- Type: Squadron
- Role: Day Bombardment
- Part of: American Expeditionary Forces (AEF)
- Engagements: World War I

Commanders
- Notable commanders: Lt. Cecil G. Sellers

Insignia
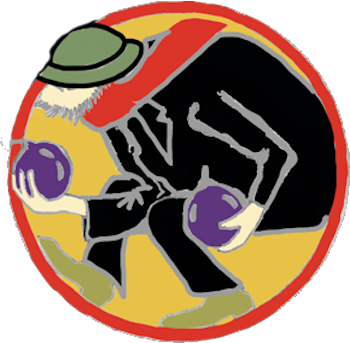
- 20th Aero Squadron Emblem

Aircraft flown
- Bomber: Dayton-Wright DH-4, 1918–1919
- Trainer: Curtiss JN-4, 1917; Standard J-1, 1917

Service record
- Operations: 1st Day Bombardment Group; Western Front, France: 5 September-11 November 1918: Sorties: 507; Combat missions: 33; Enemy combats: 11; Killed: 2; Wounded: 1; Missing: 10; Aircraft lost: 14
- Victories: Enemy Aircraft shot down: 11; Enemy Balloons shot down: 0; Total Enemy Aircraft Destroyed: 11

The 20th Aero Squadron was a United States Army Air Service unit that fought on the Western Front during World War I.

The squadron was assigned as a Day Bombardment Squadron, performing long-range bombing attacks on roads and railroads; destruction of materiel and massed troop formations behind enemy lines. It also performed strategic reconnaissance over enemy-controlled territory, and tactical bombing attacks on enemy forces in support of Army offensive operations. After the 1918 Armistice with Germany, the squadron returned to the United States in June 1919 and became part of the permanent United States Army Air Service in 1921, being re-designated as the 20th Squadron.

The current United States Air Force unit which holds its lineage and history is the 20th Bomb Squadron, assigned to the 2d Operations Group, Barksdale Air Force Base, Louisiana.

== History ==
=== Formation and training ===
The squadron was organized at Kelly Field, in San Antonio, Texas, with 150 enlisted men on 26 June 1917. There it was trained in the proper manner of soldiering being drilled and instructed. On 29 July the squadron moved to the Wilbur Wright Aviation Field, Dayton, Ohio, where it received its first training in the handling of Curtiss JN-4 and Standard J-1. While at Dayton, the squadron mechanics established a record of flight hours for one motor (165 hours) which at that time was the highest record known.

On 30 October 1917, the squadron left Wright Field for Garden City, Long Island, New York, where it was one of a group of squadrons concentrated there for shipment overseas. On 17 December, it embarked on a ship, landing at Glasgow, Scotland on 31 December. From Glasgow, taking the Glasgow & South Western Railway to Liverpool, England, then on the London and North Western Railway train which took them to Winchester, Hampshire, near the south coast of England. After two days, the squadron arrived in the late afternoon and the squadron was moved to the Romsey Rest Camp. There the squadron was divided into two detachments. One of the detachments was sent to Stamford, Lincolnshire; the other to Narborough, Norfolk where the men were trained in the technical points of airplanes being used on the front. After five months' training, the squadron was re-assembled at Stamford, where it remained until mid-August 1918 carrying on the work of a first-class squadron. Mechanics from the 20th Aero Squadron made up the first all-American flights ever used by the English on a Royal Flying Corps Aerodrome.

On 7 August the squadron was ordered to France for combat action. It was moved to Southampton on the channel coast where it embarked on a cross-channel ferry to Le Havre, Upper Normandy, France. From there it was moved to the Air Service Replacement Concentration Barracks St. Maixent, which was the primary reception center for new units assigned to American Expeditionary Forces. At St. Maixent, the 20th was organized for day bombardment duties, and it proceeded to Delouze Aerodrome, where the squadron was fully equipped and developed into a fighting unit for the First Army. The 20th was equipped with DH-4 bomber aircraft with Liberty engines and was assigned very nearly its fully quota of flying officers.

=== Combat Operations ===
The 20th was then ordered on 7 September to Amanty Airdrome, Meuse, to join the 1st Day Bombardment Group which was to be formed on 10 September, just at the beginning of the Battle of Saint-Mihiel. There, several of the planes were detached for special services. At this time it was believed that the squadron may be used as a biplane pursuit organization, as no bombs were on hand for it or the other Liberty squadrons on the field.

Trucks were dispatched to the 1st Air Depot at Colombey-les-Belles Airdrome and they returned hauling bombs. On the evening of 13 September, orders were issued for the 20th to bomb the railroad yards at Conflans-en-Jarnisy (Conflans) the following day. The armorers began loading bombs on the planes during the early hours of the morning. By daylight, the 20th Squadron was transformed into a bombing squadron, and was ready to carry out orders issued to it. The 11th and 96th Squadrons, along with the 20th took off from the field, with the 20th having the distinction of being the first squadron of American-built planes to cross the line and drop bombs on the enemy. The conditions under which the squadron began operations were far from ideal. None of the pilots or the observers had ever been over the line before. Although some of them had flown in Liberty planes, none of them had any opportunity to learn the effect bombs had on the handling of the aircraft. As a result, Lt. Stephens, the pilot of a plane taking off on one of the first raids, was killed when his engine stalled and he side-slipped and crashed. His observer, Lt. Louis, was severely injured. However, in spite of these conditions, the squadron made eight raids during the first three days of combat operations.

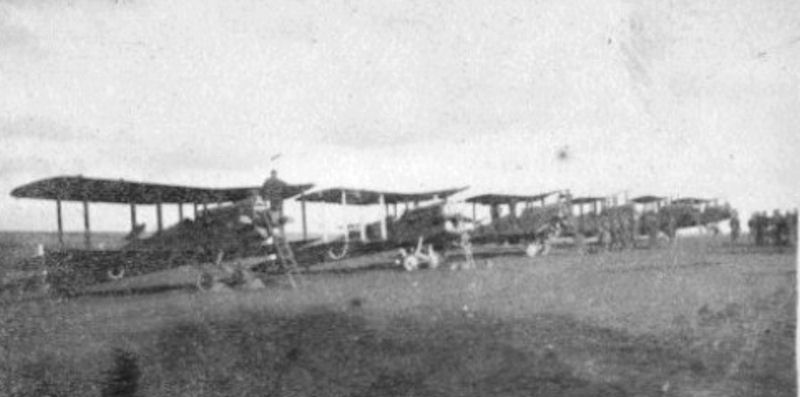
20th Aero Squadron – Airco DH-4s

On 15 September a formation of six aircraft took off to bomb the railroad yards at Conflans. Motor trouble due largely due to the excessive strain put upon the planes in the earlier days of the battle caused all but Captain Sellers to drop out and turn back before the enemy lines were reached. When Captain Sellers reached enemy territory he found himself alone. Although he and his observer knew from experience that alone he faced insuperable odds, he elected to try for the objective without support. His plane was attacked by four enemy Fokkers but were driven off in the dash for the important railway center, with his bombs being dropped on the objective. Three more enemy planes were met and driven off on the return to our lines, and the lone plane, riddled with bullet-holes, finally reached its field. For this exploit, Captain Sellers was awarded the Distinguished Service Cross (DSC). During this first phase of the squadron's operations, it lost but one man over the lines. Among the objectives attacked were Dommary-Baroncourt, Corse, Bayonville, Longuyon and Mars-Le-Tour.

During the Battle of Saint-Mihiel, a mission to bomb Etain was carried out on 16 September. During the mission, the formation was broken up due to various troubles with the airplanes. Lt. John Y Stokes, in liaison with his pilot, continued towards the enemy lines alone and joined with a formation of aircraft from the 11th Aero Squadron. After they had crossed the lines and before the objective was reached his plane was struck by anti-aircraft artillery fire, throwing the plane out of control. His engine was missing badly and after recovering control of his plane, he could not keep up with the formation. However he proceeded to his objective and dropped bombs on the enemy target. By this time, his engine had failed completely. Attacked by an enemy airplane, he dove, with a dead propeller and with continuing firing of his machine guns, Lt. Stokes held the attacking plane at bay until he was able to reach the Allied lines where his plane crashed in the tree-tops of a forest. Lt. Stoke's action was above and beyond the call of duty in volunteering to go over the lines with a formation other than his own squadron and also in successfully dropping his bombs on the objective after his aircraft had been damaged by enemy anti-aircraft fire which damaged his engine. He was initially recommended for the Medal of Honor. He was awarded the Distinguished Service Cross.

On 23 September, the squadron was moved from Amanty to Maulan Aerodrome, near Ligny-en-Barrois. It was from Maulan that the squadron did the major part of its combat operations and suffered virtually all of its casualties. A few days after its arrival on 26 September, five airplanes were lost out of a formation of seven planes over the lines, and one returned with a dead ground observer. The formation was attacked by a force of enemy scout planes three times its size. After a brief flight, five of the seven planes were down, leaving only the leader and one other. He saw the leader was experiencing great efforts to keep his plane under control and his observer was dead. Taking a position behind the other plane, he held that position in the face of increasing enemy attacks. The leader was finally able to make the Allied side of the lines and land.

And exceptional act of heroism was made by Lt William F. Frank on 23 October, when the formation was attacked flying on a mission to Buzancy. Three Fokkers dived on the formation at the beginning of a flight and he received a wound to the head which rendered him unconscious. He recovered consciousness only to find that the two planes near him in the formation had been forced down, and that one of the Fokkers was going forward to attack the leader. Although weakened by his wound, he turned his guns on the enemy aircraft and brought it down. He then drove off the other Fokkers which were attacking his plane from the other side, and then fell exhausted in his seat. A few days later on 5 November, Lt Frank himself was lost over the lines when three of the squadrons planes were shot down on a mission.

Bad weather prevented further flying for several days, although the squadron remained on the "alert". On 11 November, the signing of the armistice put an end to the alert, but the squadron continued to fly on patrol and practice aerial maneuvers while waiting for further orders.

=== Demobilization ===
With the end of hostilities, the squadron took much liberty in France. On 17 January 1919 orders were received for the squadron to report to the 1st Air Depot, Colombey-les-Belles Airdrome to turn in all of its supplies and equipment and was relieved from duty with the AEF. The squadron's DH-4 aircraft were delivered to the Air Service Production Center No. 2. at Romorantin Aerodrome, and there, practically all of the pilots and observers were detached from the squadron.

Personnel were subsequently assigned to the commanding general, services of supply, and ordered to report to one of several staging camps in France. The 20th traveled by train to Guîtres, near Bordeaux, where the squadron spent a month before again moving to Saint-Denis-de-Pile. A few days later the squadron moved to Libourne where it spent several months awaiting transport home to the United States. The squadron embarked on a ship at Bordeaux at the end of April and arrived at Mitchel Field, New York on 2 May 1919. There most of the men returned to civilian life, being discharged from Army service.

=== Lineage ===
- Organized as 20th Aero Squadron on 26 June 1917

Re-designated: 20th Aero Squadron (Day Bombardment), August 1918
Re-designated: 20th Squadron (Bombardment) on 14 March 1921

=== Assignments ===
- Post Headquarters, Kelly Field, 26 June-29 July 1917
- Post Headquarters, Wright Field, 29 July-1 November 1917
- Aviation Concentration Center, 1 November-31 December 1917
- Air Service Headquarters, AEF, British Isles, 31 December 1917 – 23 August 1918

Attached to the Royal Flying Corps for training entire period

- Replacement Concentration Center, AEF, 23–26 August 1918
- First Army Air Service, 26 August 1918
- 1st Day Bombardment Group, 10 September 1918 (First Army until 17 December ?)
- 1st Air Depot, AEF, 17–19 January 1919
- Commanding General, Services of Supply, 19 January-2 May 1919
- Post Headquarters, Mitchell Field, 2 May 1919

=== Stations ===
- Camp Kelly, Texas, 26 June 1917
- Wilbur Wright Field, Ohio, 29 July 1917
- Aviation Concentration Center, Garden City, New York, 1 November 1917
- Port of Entry, Hoboken, New Jersey

Trans-Atlantic crossing, 17–31 December 1917

- Glasgow, Scotland, 31 December 1918
- Winchester, England

Romsey RC, Winchester, England, 2–4 January 1918
Detachment assigned to: Stamford, England, 7 January-15 August 1918
Detachment assigned to: Narborough, England, 7 January-15 August 1918

- Stamford, England, 15 August 1918
- Southampton, England, 20 August 1918
- Le Havre, France, 22 August 1918
- St. Maixent Replacement Barracks, 23 August 1918
- Delouze Aerodrome, France, 26 August 1918
- Amanty Airdrome, France, 7 September 1918
- Maulan Aerodrome, France, 23 September 1918
- Colombey-les-Belles Airdrome, France, 17 January 1919
- Guitres, France, 19 January 1919
- Saint-Denis-de-Pile, France 14 February 1919
- Libourne, France, 27 Feb-20 Apr 1919
- Mitchel Field, New York, 2 May 1919

=== Combat sectors and campaigns ===
Streamer	Sector/Campaign	Dates	Notes
	St. Mihiel Offensive Campaign	14–16 September 1918	
	Toul Sector	17–23 September 1918	
	Meuse-Argonne Offensive Campaign	26 September-11 November 1918	

=== Notable personnel ===
- Cpl. Raymond C. Alexander, SSC
- Lt. William F. Frank, DSC, 1 aerial victory, (KIA)
- Lt. Sidney Howard, SSC
- Lt. L. P. Koepfgen, SSC
- Lt. Edmund C. Leonard, SSC
- Lt. Elmer Pendell, DSC

DSC: Distinguished Service Cross; SSC: Silver Star Citation

== See also ==
- Organization of the Air Service of the American Expeditionary Force
- List of American aero squadrons
