= 166th Aero Squadron =

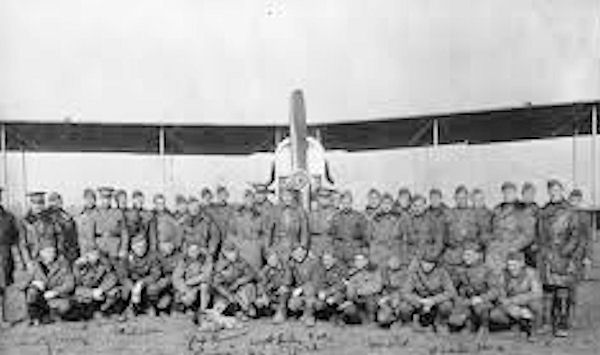
- Members of the 166th Aero Squadron in front of a Dayton-Wright DH-4
- Active: 18 December 1917 – Present
- Country: United States
- Branch: United States Army Air Service
- Type: Squadron
- Role: Day Bombardment
- Part of: American Expeditionary Forces (AEF)
- Engagements: World War I Occupation of the Rhineland

Commanders
- Notable commanders: Capt. Victor Parks Jr.

Insignia
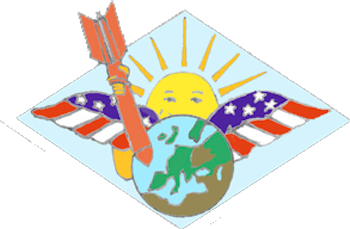
- 166th Aero Squadron Emblem

Aircraft flown
- Bomber: Dayton-Wright DH-4, 1918–1919
- Trainer: Curtiss JN-4, 1917; Standard J-1, 1917

Service record
- Operations: 1st Day Bombardment Group; Western Front, France: 20 September-11 November 1918: Sorties: 192; Combat missions: 13; Enemy combats: 2; Killed: 1; Wounded: 3; Missing: 0; Aircraft lost: 0
- Victories: Enemy Aircraft shot down: 6; Enemy Balloons shot down: 0; Total Enemy Aircraft Destroyed: 6

The 166th Aero Squadron was a United States Army Air Service unit that fought on the Western Front during World War I.

The squadron was assigned as a Day Bombardment Squadron, performing long-range bombing attacks on roads and railroads; destruction of materiel and massed troop formations behind enemy lines. It also performed strategic reconnaissance over enemy-controlled territory, and tactical bombing attacks on enemy forces in support of Army offensive operations.

After the 1918 Armistice with Germany, the squadron was assigned to the United States Third Army as part of the Occupation of the Rhineland in Germany. It returned to the United States in June 1919 and became part of the permanent United States Army Air Service in 1921, being re-designated as the 49th Squadron (Bombardment).

The current United States Air Force unit which holds its lineage and history is the 49th Test and Evaluation Squadron, assigned to the 53d Wing, Barksdale Air Force Base, Louisiana.

== History ==
=== Organization and training ===
The squadron was organized at Kelly Field, San Antonio, Texas on 18 December 1917. After several days, the squadron was moved to Wilbur Wright Field, Dayton Ohio where it received its first training in the handling of Curtiss JN-4 and Standard J-1 aircraft.

On 20 February 1918, the squadron left Wright Field for Garden City, Long Island, New York, where it was one of a group of squadrons concentrated there for shipment overseas. On 5 March it embarked on a White Star Line ship, landing at Liverpool, England on 19 March. The squadron was then moved to Catterick Airdrome, Catterick Bridge, North Yorkshire in England for four and one-half months of training with the Royal Flying Corps. On 7 August the squadron was ordered to France for combat action. It was moved to Southampton on the channel coast where it embarked on a cross-channel ferry to Le Havre, Upper Normandy, France on the night of 12/13 August. From there it was moved to the St. Maixent Aerodrome which was the primary reception center for new units assigned to American Expeditionary Forces.

At St. Maixent, the squadron spent four days being equipped in all manner of equipment necessary for combat on the front, then was moved to Romorantin Aerodrome where the pilots of the squadron were equipped with de Havilland DH-4 aircraft with Liberty Engines. Initially the squadron was scheduled to remain at Romorantin for several weeks of flight training, however the order was given to move to Colombey-les-Belles Airdrome, after just two days. However, when the squadron arrived there, it was informed that the squadron was supposed to go to Delouze Aerodrome, which it arrived three days later. After a series of delays and moves to several different Airdromes the squadron arrived at Maulan Aerodrome in the early hours of 25 September.

=== Combat operations ===
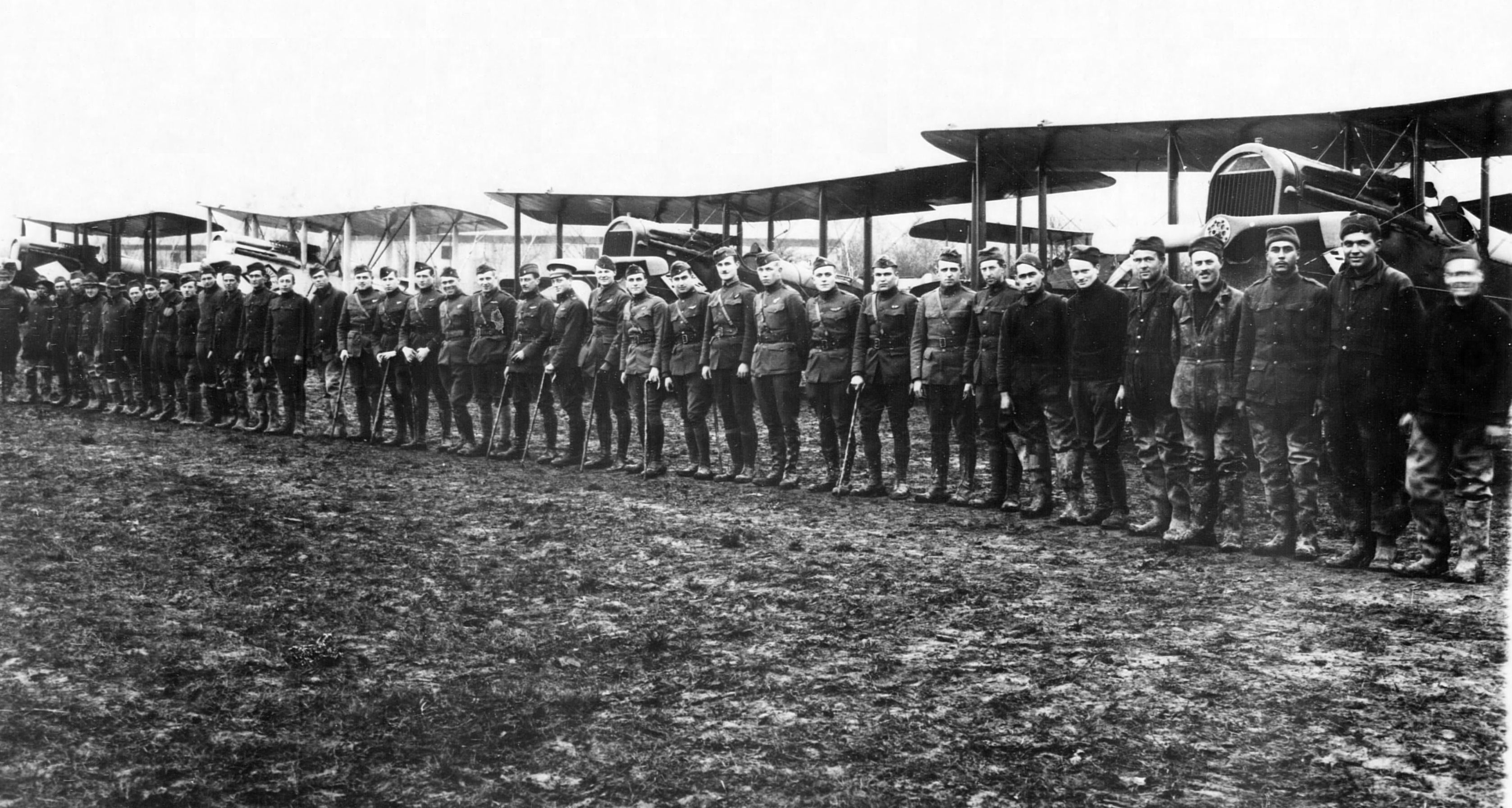
Men and aircraft of the 166th Aero Squadron, November 1918

At Maulan the squadron set up headquarters, mess and recreation tents and set up the airfield for combat operations. On 18 October, the 166th made its initial combat patrol, when at 14:00 thirteen pilots took off to attack Buzancy. Dropping 800 kg of bombs on the target, the formation was attacked by a formation of eight enemy Fokker aircraft. Two squadron aircraft were crippled, however they were able to make it back to friendly territory. One enemy aircraft was shot down.

Weather conditions prevented further combat operations until 23 October. Thirteen planes took off to conduct a raid on Bois de Barricourt. Six planes reached the objective and dropped 600 kg of bombs. The formation was attacked by ten Fokkers who offered stubborn resistance all the way to the objective and then back to the lines when they turned off. During the combat, three squadron planes were forced to land, however the pilots reached the safety of Allied lines. Two Fokkers were shot down. Continuing poor weather conditions delayed further offensive operations until 27 October when fifteen planes took off on a raid to Briquenay. Nine planes reached the target and dropped 900 kg of bombs. A raid on Montigny two days later was a success with eleven planes reaching the target.

Additional raids on 30 and 31 October ended combat actions when poor weather again moved in. 3 November saw two bombing raids, one on Stengy in the morning, then hitting Beaumont in the afternoon. The last raid by the 166th Aero Squadron occurred on 5 November when eleven planes attacked Montmedy. The attackers were intercepted by eight German Fokkers, one of which being a tri-plane. Severe cloud cover over the target made it impossible to bomb the target, so a secondary target at Raucourt was bombed instead.

Weather conditions prevented further operations up until the Armistice was declared. The squadron was in combat for less than one month. Twelve successful raids were carried out with six enemy aircraft destroyed. No squadrons planes were lost, although one observer was killed, two wounded along with a pilot being wounded.

=== Demobilization ===
After the armistice, the 166th remained at Maulan until being ordered to the Third Army Air Service, moving on 22 November to the Joppécourt Aerodrome, then on 5 January 1919 to Trier Aerodrome. On 15 April 1919 orders were received for the squadron to report to the 1st Air Depot, Colombey-les-Belles Airdrome to turn in all of its supplies and equipment and was relieved from duty with the AEF. The squadron's DH-4 aircraft were delivered to the Air Service Production Center No. 2. at Romorantin Aerodrome, and there, practically all of the pilots and observers were detached from the squadron.

Personnel were subsequently assigned to the commanding general, services of supply, and ordered to report to a staging camp at Le Mans. There, personnel awaited scheduling to report to one of the base ports in France for transport to the United States and subsequent demobilization. The squadron finally embarked at Brest for the trans-Atlantic crossing home, arriving in New York Harbor in mid June 1919. There most of the men were demobilized and returned to civilian life.

=== Lineage ===
- Organized as 166th Aero Squadron on 18 December 1917

Re-designated: 166th Aero Squadron (Day Bombardment), August 1918
Re-designated as 49th Squadron (Bombardment) on 14 March 1921

=== Assignments ===
- Post Headquarters, Kelly Field, 18 December 1917
- Post Headquarters, Wilbur Wright Field, 24 December 1917 – 20 February 1918
- Aviation Concentration Center, 20 February-5 March 1918
- Air Service Headquarters, AEF British Isles, 25 March 1918

Attached to the Royal Flying Corps for training, 25 March-7 August 1918

- Replacement Concentration Center, 14–18 August 1918
- Air Service Production Center No. 2, 18–20 August 1918
- 1st Air Depot, 22–25 August 1918
- First Army Air Service, c. 7 Septembre 1918
- 1st Day Bombardment Group, 10 September 1918
- Third Army Air Service, 21 November 1918
- 1st Air Depot, 15 April 1919
- Commanding General, Services of Supply, April-17 June 1919
- Post Headquarters, Mitchel Field, 17 June 1919

=== Stations ===
- Kelly Field, Texas, 18 December 1917
- Wilbur Wright Field, Ohio, 24 December 1917 – 20 February 1918
- Aviation Concentration Center, Garden City, New York, 20 February 1918
- Port of Entry, Hoboken, New Jersey

Overseas transport: 5–19 March 1918

- Liverpool, England, 19 March 1918
- Winchester, England, 20 March 1918
- Catterick Airdrome, England, 25 March – 7 August 1918
- St. Maixent Replacement Barracks, France, 14–18 August 1918
- Romorantin Aerodrome, France, 18–20 August 1918
- Colombey-les-Belles Airdrome, France, 22–25 August 1918
- Delouze Aerodrome, France, 26 August 1918
- Vinets-sur-Aube Aerodrome, France, 1 September 1918
- Delouze Aerodrome, France, 7 September 1918
- Colombey-les-Belles Airdrome, France, 12 September 1918
- Amanty Airdrome, France, 21 September 1918
- Maulan Aerodrome, France, 25 September 1918
- Joppécourt Aerodrome, France, 22 November 1918
- Trier Airdrome, Germany 5 January 1919
- Coblenz Airdrome, Fort Kaiser Alexander, Germany, 19 January 1919
- Colombey-les-Belles Airdrome, France, 15 April 1919
- Le Mans, France, 3 May 1919
- Brest, France, 19 May – 3 June 1919
- Mitchel Field, New York, 17 June 1919

=== Combat sectors and campaigns ===
Streamer	Sector/Campaign	Dates	Notes
	Meuse-Argonne Offensive Campaign	18 October-11 November 1918	

=== Notable personnel ===
- Lt. Stanley L. Cochrane, SSC
- Lt. George R. Cullman, SSC
- Lt. John Devery, SSC
- Lt. Herman Feinstein, SSC
- Lt. Richard Wilson Steele, DSC, 1 aerial victory
- Lt. Alexander Tolchan, SSC

DSC: Distinguished Service Cross; SSC: Silver Star Citation

== See also ==
- Organization of the Air Service of the American Expeditionary Force
- List of American aero squadrons
