= 96th Aero Squadron =

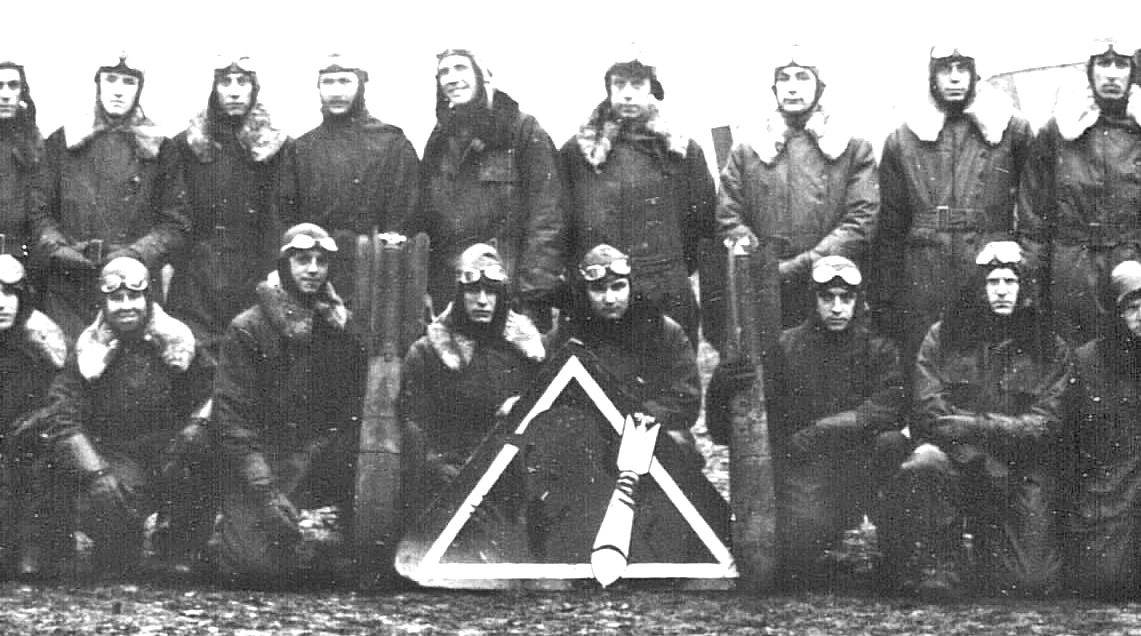
- Aviators of the 96th Aero Squadron, November 1918
- Active: 20 August 1917 – 1921 (became 96th Squadron (Bombardment))
- Country: United States
- Branch: Air Service, United States Army
- Type: Squadron
- Role: Day bombardment
- Part of: American Expeditionary Forces (AEF)
- Engagements: World War I

Commanders
- Notable commanders: Maj. H. M. Brown; Capt. James A. Summersett Jr. (temporary); Maj. J. L. Dunsworth; Capt. James A. Summersett Jr. (permanent)

Insignia
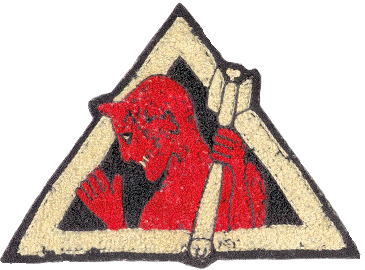
- 96th Aero Squadron emblem

Aircraft flown
- Bomber: Breguet 14B.2, 1918–1919

Service record
- Operations: 1st Day Bombardment Group; Western Front, France: 29 May – 11 November 1918: Sorties: 1,149; Combat missions: 86; Enemy combats: 22; Killed: 6; Wounded:10; Missing:30; Aircraft lost: 17
- Victories: Enemy aircraft shot down: 14; Enemy balloons shot down: 0; Total enemy aircraft destroyed: 14

The 96th Aero Squadron was an Air Service, United States Army unit that fought on the Western Front during World War I.

The squadron was assigned as a day bombardment squadron, performing long-range bombing attacks on roads and railroads: destruction of materiel and massed troop formations behind enemy lines. It also performed strategic reconnaissance over enemy-controlled territory, and tactical bombing attacks on enemy forces in support of Army offensive operations. After the 1918 Armistice with Germany, the squadron returned to the United States in May 1919 and became part of the permanent United States Army Air Service in 1921, being re-designated as the 96th Squadron (Bombardment).

The 96th Bomb Squadron, assigned to the 2d Operations Group, Barksdale Air Force Base, Louisiana, is the squadron's descendant United States Air Force unit, which has inherited its lineage and honors.

== History ==
=== Formation and training ===
The 96th Bomb Squadron began in August 1917 at Kelly Field, Texas, as the 96th Aero Squadron. Like most other units being formed by the Air Service in summer 1917, the men of the unit had no definite conception of what lay in store, whether it would be among the units deployed to France for combat, or be used in the United States for other duties. It consisted of 80 men, largely college graduates or college dropouts, volunteers all, and something of an elite group, since their aeronautical qualifications were the highest in the U.S. Army Air Service.

At Kelly Field, the squadron was thoroughly drilled every day in the lessons of soldiering, and given considerable fatigue duty to indoctrinate the men into Army service. The squadron was threatened by a severe attack of ptomaine poisoning, which put half of the personnel in the hospital, but which did not result in any deaths. On 9 October, the squadron was ordered to the Aviation Concentration and Supply Depot at Mineola, New York, to be outfitted for overseas duty.

The squadron was allowed to embark on 27 October at New York Harbor pier 61 on the former White Star Liner RMS Adriatic. After an uneventful trans-Atlantic voyage, it arrived in Liverpool, England, on 10 November. After disembarking, the squadron was marched from the docks to the Liverpool railway station where it boarded a London and North Western Railway train which took them to Winchester, Hampshire, near the south coast of England. Arriving in the late afternoon the squadron was moved to the Romsey Rest Camp. Initially the squadron was ordered for six months' training in England under the tutelage of the Royal Flying Corps; however, a change in orders caused immediate departure for France. Moved to Southampton, the squadron embarked on a cross-channel ferry to Le Havre, Upper Normandy, France. From there it was moved to the 7th Aviation Instruction Center, Aulnat Aerodrome, Clermont-Ferrand, where it arrived on 16 November 1917.

As a pioneer squadron in the new school of bombardment instruction, the 96th was given complete control of the hangars, transportation and armament, and assisted in organizing the systems of management still in force. The mechanics of the squadron acquired a complete knowledge of the Breguet 14B.2 day bombardment plane and of the Renault motor, by daily visits to the nearby Michelin factory where the planes were made. The experience thus gained by assisting in the construction of the planes, and assembling the Renault motors in the factory, proved of immense value when the squadron was sent to the Zone of Advance. On 18 May 1918 ten bombing teams (A Pilot and Observer) were assigned to the squadron to fly the planes to the combat front.

=== Toul Sector Combat Operations ===
The 96th Aero Squadron was ordered to Amanty Airdrome in the Toul Sector and became established as a bombing unit in active service against the enemy. The flying equipment of the squadron consisted of ten Breguet 14B.2 aircraft, which had been transferred by the 7th Aviation Instruction Center. The planes were in very poor condition, having been used for instruction since December 1917, and were in constant need of major repairs even before used as bomb carriers. At Amanty ten more teams, who had come there a month before, were assigned to the squadron to complete its organization. Just before embarking upon its first aerial warfare, the squadron decided upon its insignia, a black triangle outlined by a white strip enclosing the profile of a red devil thumbing his nose at the ground with his right hand. In his left, he held a white bomb. This distinctive emblem was designed by the squadron's talented graphic artist, Harry O. Lawson.

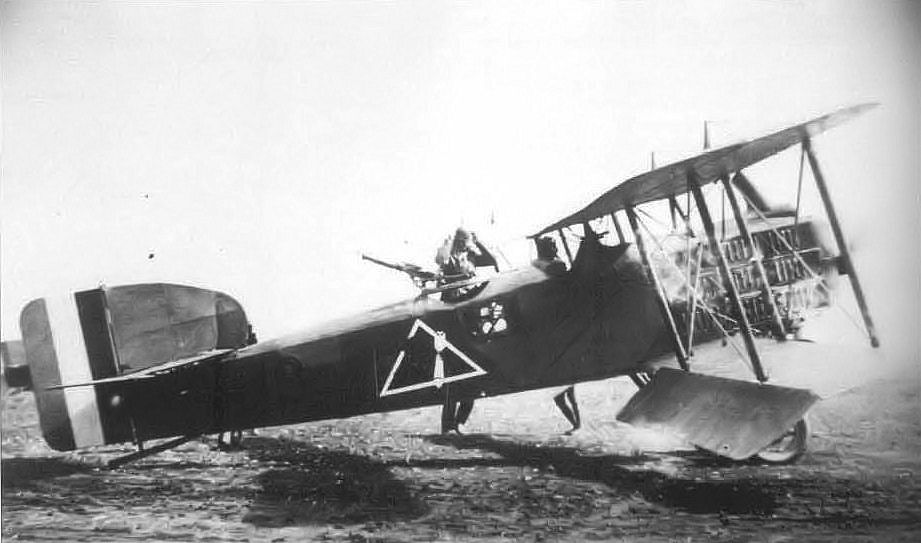
Breguet 14 B.2 bomber of the 96th Aero Squadron

Initial operations consisted of several practice patrols covering the rear area of the sector and giving the Pilots the opportunity of flying together. The 96th saw combat supporting the U.S. First Army and the French Eighth Army from 12 June until the end of the war, becoming part of the 1st Day Bombardment Group with the 11th and 20th Aero Squadrons on 10 September.

The first bombing mission undertaken by the 96th was an event which excited great interest in the sector. Late afternoon of 12 June found eight planes loaded with bombs and ready for the long anticipated raid to a hostile objective. The squadron was practically without precedent for guidance, as it was isolated from other flying squadrons and had only two pilots on the rolls who had ever crossed the lines. At 16:30, the flight took off. Owing to the worn out condition of the motors, considerable time was spent in attaining a bombing altitude of 4000 meters. The objective was reached without mishap, save that two planes were forced to return because of motor trouble. (100 years to the day, on June 12, 2018, the legacy USAF unit, the 96th Bomb Squadron in Barksdale AFB, with the motto 'First to Bomb', flew a B-52 commemorative training mission joined by a KC-135R tanker and French Dassault Mirage 2000D fighters with the combined formation flying over Étain.)

The squadron's baptism of anti-aircraft fire was received over Etain. The "Archies" (anti-aircraft fire) were particularly active and accurate over the objective. Lt. Rath bombed into the wind, and scored a good hit. Bursts were observed in the railroad yards, and the trail of bombs, 640 kilos in all, extended to the warehouses beyond the tracks. No photographs were obtained. The formation was attacked on the return flight by two enemy scout planes and one biplane fighter. The pilots closed in and held a tight formation, however, and the observers were able to beat off the attack after crossing our lines. One of the planes, received two explosive bullets in the motor, but was able to reach the airdrome. Three planes were forced to land with nearly empty gasoline tanks, but all landed safely. The other three arrived at the airdrome at 20:00. that night, the entire squadron joined in a camp jubilee to celebrate the unqualified success of the first American bombing raid.

The first big loss to the 96th came on 10 July when a formation of six planes was forced to land in hostile territory. All day the weather had been extremely unfavorable, but the clouds seemed to lift in the late afternoon. The formation left the airdrome at 18:05 PM, and was almost immediately swallowed up by the descending clouds. A strong southwest wind swept the planes northward, but the sky did not completely close until an hour after the take off. It is supposed that the leader was unable to find the objective on account of the storm and unable to recross the lines against the wind before the gasoline gave out. A wireless message was intercepted that night, stating that five American bombing planes attempting a raid on Koblenz, had been captured. The next day the sixth plane was heard from, also in German hands. All the pilots and observers were reported safe.

During the third week of July, eleven new Breguets, including two Corps d' Armee type, with photographic equipment, were delivered to the squadron as replacements. Many practice formations and bomb tests were held on flying days, while the engineering department prepared the planes for over-the-lines duty. Replacements of pilots and observers had arrived so that the squadron had 16 teams available for duty.

The first raid with the new equipment was carried out 1 August when eight planes, in a double V formation, bombed the warehouses and the railroad yards at Conflans. 960 kilograms of bombs were dropped; the exposure, although unsuccessful on this raid, valuable information regarding railroad activities was brought back by the observers. The burst were well bunched in the yards.

Adverse weather, high winds and formidable low clouds prevented extensive flying until 11 August 11, when Captain Cecil G. Sellers led a formation to Montmedy and dropped 1120 kilos of bombs, cutting the railroad track at the outskirts. On 12 August, the first successful photographs were obtained of bombs bursting in the railroad yards at Conflans on 23 August a raid was made on a marshaling yard at Dommary-Baroncourt, where good hits were made on the tracks with 880 kilos of bombs. 14 August was the first day on which the squadron was able to carry out two distinct missions, one to Longuyon in the morning and a second to Dommary-Baroncourtt in the afternoon. On the return from Longuyon, the squadron had its first "Close In" combat with enemy scout planes. The formation had dwindled down to five planes, which were seen by members of the German pursuit squadron stationed near Longuyon. Upon approaching the objective, the pilots and observers flew the enemy planes taking off from their field, and watched them gain altitude in remarkable short time. The enemy planes, numbering four, attacked from the sun, opening fire at 400 yards distance. The enemy planes followed the Breguet formation to the lines. Two planes were hit by anti-aircraft fire, but all returned safely to the airdrome. 1440 kilos of bombs were dropped that day.

Two raids were carried out the following day, one to Dommary-Baroncourt, on which good hits were scored, and the second to Conflans which was hotly attacked by 11 enemy scouts after releasing the bombs. Dommary-Baroncourt was hit again on the 16th of the month, Longuyon on the 20th and 21st, Audun-le-Roman on the 21 and Conflans once on the 22d and twice on the 23d, again on the 26th and Longuyon on the 25th. 30 August was a banner day for raids; Conflans was bombed at daylight; Longuyon at noon and Conflans again in the early evening. During the 14 flying days of August, the 96th carried out 20 successful raids, dropping 19,480 kilos of bombs. Precision bombing attained a high efficiency among the leading observers so that perfect hits were the rule. The average number of planes available was ten; the loss in planes was two.

The squadron continued to operate from the Amaty Field, dropping propaganda as well as bombs, until 23 September, when the squadron was moved to Maulan Aerodrome, near Ligny-en-Barrois, to prepare for the Argonne Drive.

=== Battle of Saint-Mihiel ===
12 September opened the great Battle of Saint-Mihiel, was, on all counts the worst flying day in many months. A terrific southwest wind made formation flying extremely dangerous, and the low fast moving clouds made it impossible to see more than two or three kilometers. In the morning the cloud ceiling was very low, but the afternoon brought clear spaces with no decrease in the violence of the wind. The end of the first day found the squadron badly crippled having lost three of the personnel, killed, and eight planes wrecked or put out of commission.

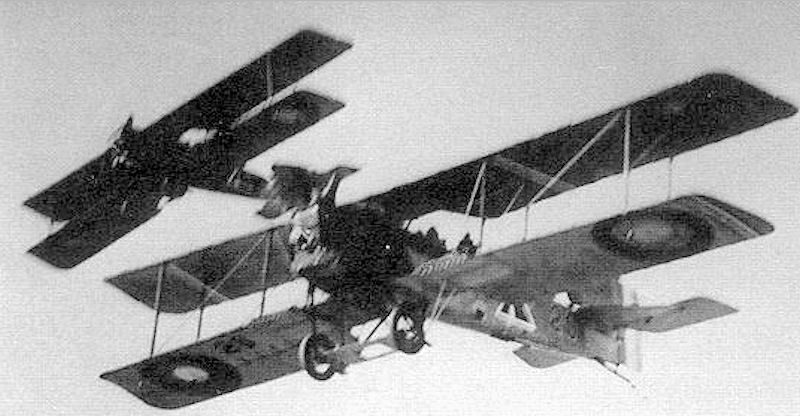
Breguet 14B2s Formation

The first mission undertaken was a solo raid that left the airdrome at 10:45 AM. The objective was Buxières-lès-Clefmont, where hostile troops were concentrating. The plane did not return, and was later reported to have come down in flames south of Commercy. The pilot jumped; his body was found at some distance from the wreck. The observer was burned to death. As no bombs were found in the wreckage, it was presumed that the mission had been accomplished. At 13:30 PM, eight planes bombed the troop center at Buxières. A perfect hit was made, the bombs cutting a trail through the town. The third mission of the day, a formation of five planes was to bomb the troops at Vigneulles. Owing to the lateness of starting, 18:35 PM, the objective was not reached until after dark. The bombs were released over the town, but observation of the hits was impossible. The formation returned to the airdrome in the darkness, the pilots guiding on the exhaust fires from the planes ahead of them. Landing at the field was attempted with the aid of ground flares, but only one of four planes landed successfully. One plane crashed in the forest back of the hangars, the other two piled up on the field. The fifth plane crashed on a plowed field near Gondrecourt-le-Château. The pilot was killed. The observer was uninjured.

On the second day of the battle, the five available planes were ordered out to bomb the roads between Chambley and Mrs-le-Tour. Four planes left the ground, but one was forced to land in a nearby field. The other three continued the mission, and bombed the ammunition dump at Chambley from an altitude of 1000 Meters. The planes were surrounded at the objective by 15 enemy scouts. In the terrible fight which ensued, two planes were shot down, one went down in control, the second in flames. Lt. Gaylord, pilot and Lt. Rath, observer, managed to cut their way to the lines and landed safely at the airdrome. One enemy plane was shot down in the combat.

The losses of the first two days in no way disheartened the fliers of the 96th. Ten planes were ready for the first raid on the morning of the 16th. The formation, which left the field continued to the objective despite the fact that the formation had dwindled down to three planes. Conflans was reached, concealed by several layers of clouds. A favorable opening permitted the formation to descend below the clouds and the squadron scored a perfect hit at the neck of the railroad yards. Enemy aircraft began to appear before the objective was reached and a game of hide and seek in the clouds with 20 enemy planes was the program for the next half-hour. All three planes landed safely at the home field. Two other missions were carried out that day, bombing successfully the troops on the roads between Vittonville and Armonville, on the Moselle River. The bridge at Arnaville was bombed the next day, and Longuyon and the 15th and 16th. Enemy planes were encountered, but their attacks were not persistent.

=== Meuse-Argonne Offensive ===
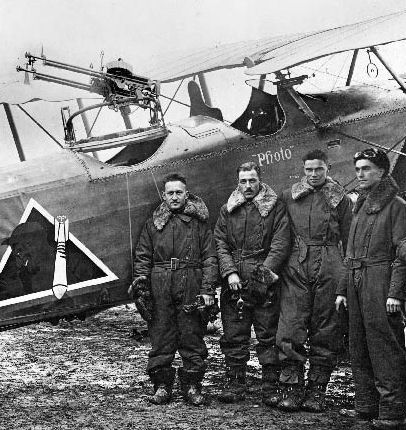
96th Aero Squadron – 2d Lt. Avrom Hexter, 1st Lt. Samuel Hunt, 1st Lt. David Young, and 1st Lt. Howard Rath. (Photo taken on 12 November 1918)

The first raid of the Argonne offensive was a mission to Dun-sur-Meuse, carried out with the usual success. The formation of six planes was attacked by ten Fokkers and Pfalz scouts. Two of the enemy planes were shot down out of control between Clery and Cunel. Etain was bombed just before dark, 27 September, by a formation of 12, all of which returned safely. A total of 2400 kilos of bombs were dropped on this raid. On 29 September a highly successful raid was carried out with Grandpré as objective. 12 planes reached Grandpré, dropping 1600 kilos of bombs.

For the first time since the squadron had been operating the pursuit planes cooperated closely with the bombers. The protection afforded by pursuit planes, though often of an indirect kind, was of immense value for precision bombing. The observers were able to make careful calculations regarding certain of doing their best work if undisturbed by the enemy scouts.

The 96th had plenty of planes, but was short of pilots and observers to carry out the operation orders on a large scale. Accordingly, flying personnel was borrowed from the 11th and 20th Aero Squadrons. The formations would leave the ground numbering 17 to 20 planes, and allowing for motor trouble and other difficulties due to difference in range of speed, there generally would be a tight formation of 12 to 14 planes when the objective was reached. The success of the big formations was best as when attacked, the planes could form a tighter fighting rear line than in a small formation and often the sight of a well-organized large formation was enough to warn enemy scouts of the hot reception to expect should they attack.

One of the first successes with a large formation was the bombing of Bantheville, 1 October, with 13 planes in "vol du canard" 1240 kilos of bombs made great havoc in the town, starting three fires with incendiaries. In the fight over Landres-et-St. Georges, against 30 enemy scouts, the 96th did not lose a single plane but brought down two of the enemy. When the fight was at its height, a group of American pursuit planes arrived and mixed with the enemy in what is popularly called a "dog fight". The Spads claimed eleven of the enemy.

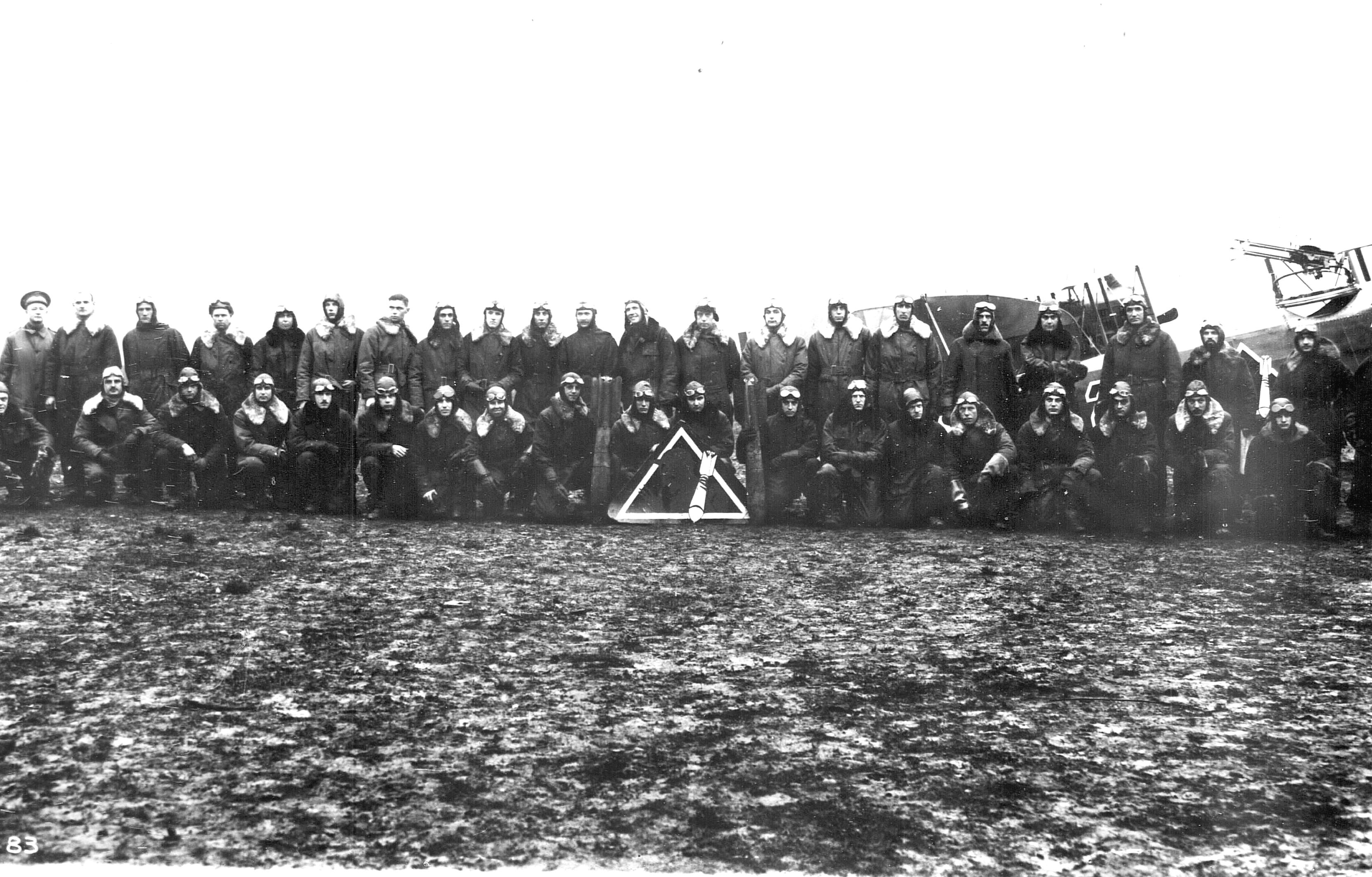
96th Aero Squadron – Group photo of officers, November 1918

18 October was a record date in the annals of the squadron. A formation of 14 planes reached its objective, Sivry, with all its planes, and trailed bombs through the center of the town and to the roads beyond. 1600 kilos of bombs, including 40 of the new incendiaries were dropped. Fifteen Fokkers and Pfaltz scout planes were encountered, but their attack was not well organized. One Fokker attacked the leader from off the right wing, a blind spot on the Breguet, and managed to escape by diving under the right side of the formation line.

On 4 November, the last fight of the 96th proved, to be the hottest of its many encounters with enemy airplanes. A formation of five planes bombed Montmédy, where photographs taken show wonderful hits. 15 Pfaltz attacked before a turn could be made at the objective, and continued to harass the formation for 20 minutes. Our observers brought down two enemy planes, one in flames.

Bad weather prevented further flying for several days, although the squadron remained on the "alert". On 11 November, the signing of the armistice put an end to the alert, but the squadron continued to fly on patrol and practice aerial maneuvers while waiting for further orders.

=== Demobilization ===
With the end of hostilities, the squadron took much liberty in France. On 10 January 1919 orders were received for the squadron to report to the 1st Air Depot, Colombey-les-Belles Airdrome to turn in all of its supplies and equipment and was relieved from duty with the AEF. The squadron's Breguet aircraft were delivered to the Air Service American Air Service Acceptance Park No. 1 at Orly Aerodrome to be returned to the French. There practically all of the pilots and observers were detached from the squadron.

Personnel were subsequently assigned to the commanding general, services of supply, and ordered to report to one of several staging camps in France. Without aircraft, it traveled by train to Saint-Denis-de-Pile, near Bordeaux, where the squadron spent a pleasant spring awaiting transport home to the United States. Another move to Libourne in mid-April was made before embarking on a ship and returning to the United States, where most of the men returned to civilian life, being discharged at Mitchel Field, New York.

=== Lineage ===
- Organized as 96th Aero Squadron on 20 August 1917

Re-designated: 96th Aero Squadron (Day Bombardment), May 1918
Re-designated: 96th Squadron (Bombardment) on 14 March 1921

=== Assignments ===
- Post Headquarters, Kelly Field, 20 August-7 October 1917
- Aviation Concentration Center, 9 October-10 November 1917
- Air Service Headquarters, AEF, British Isles, 10 November 1917 – 14 March 1918

Attached to the Royal Flying Corps for training, 10 November 1917 – 14 March 1918

- First Army Air Service, 18 May 1918
- 1st Day Bombardment Group, 10 September 1918 (First Army until 17 December ?)
- 1st Air Depot, AEF, 10 January-13 February 1919
- Commanding general, Services of Supply, 13 February-2 May 1919
- Post Headquarters, Mitchel Field, 2 May 1919

=== Stations ===
- Kelly Field, Texas, 20 August-7 October 1917
- Aviation Concentration Center, Garden City, New York, 9 October 1917
- Port of Entry, Hoboken, New Jersey

Trans-Atlantic crossing: RMS Adriatic, 27 October-10 November 1917

- Liverpool, England, 10 November 1917
- Winchester, England, 11 November 1917

Romsey RC, Winchester, England, 11–14 November 1917

- Le Havre, France, 14 March 1918
- Aulnat Aerodrome, Clermont-Ferrand, France, 16 November 1917
- Amanty Airdrome, France, 18 May 1918
- Maulan Aerodrome, France, 23 September 1918
- Colombey-les-Belles Airdrome, France, 10 January 1919
- Saint-Denis-de-Pile, France, 13 February 1919
- Libourne (?), France, 12–16 April 1919
- Mitchel Field, New York, 2 May 1919

=== Combat sectors and campaigns ===
Streamer	Sector/Campaign	Dates	Notes
	Toul Sector	22 June-11 September 1918; 17–23 September 1918	
	St. Mihiel Offensive Campaign	12–16 September 1918	
	Meuse-Argonne Offensive Campaign	26 September-11 November 1918	

=== Notable personnel ===
- Lt. Arthur H. Alexander, DSC, 2 aerial victories
- Lt. Charles Patrick Anderson, (KIA)
- Lt. Charles R. Codman
- Lt. Ralph I. Coryell, SSC
- Lt. Edward Matthew Cronin, (KIA)
- Lt. Bradley Gaylord, DSC, 1 Aerial victory
- Lt. Robert P. Elliott, DSC, 2 aerial victories
- Lt. Thomas H. Farnsworth, DSC, 2 aerial victories, (KIA)
- Lt. Andre H. Gundelach, DSC, 2 aerial victories, (KIA)
- Lt. Avrome N. Hexier, SSC
- Lt. Stephen T. Hopkins, DSC, 1 aerial victory, (KIA)
- Lt. Bruce C. Hopper, SSC
- Lt. Arthur H. Kelly, SSC
- Lt. Paul E. Lakin, SSC
- Maj. Milford Brown, CO
- Maj. James Leo Dunsworth, CO
- Lt. Samuel M. Lunt, SSC
- Lt. Elmore K. McKay, DSC, 3 aerial victories
- Lt. Harry O. McDougall, DSC, 3 aerial victories
- Lt. Paul J. O'Donnell, DSC, 2 aerial victories, (KIA)
- Lt. Henry L. Pancoast, SSC
- Lt. Howard G. Rath, DSC, 2 aerial victories
- Lt. Newton Chauncey Rogers, (KIA)
- Lt. Kenneth P. Strawn, (KIA)
- Lt. William A. Stuart, (KIA)
- Lt. Raymond C. Taylor, (KIA)
- Lt. Walton B. Ten Eyck, Jr., DSC, 2 aerial victories
- Lt. Robert E. Thompson, DSC, 2 aerial victories, (KIA)
- Lt. Donald D. Warner, DSC, 2 aerial victories
- Lt. Pennington H. Way, DSC, 1 aerial victory, (KIA)
- Lt. Bertram Williams, DSC, 1 aerial victory, (KIA)
- Capt. David H. Young, SSC
- Capt. James A. Summersett Jr., CO, DSC, 1 aerial victory

DSC: Distinguished Service Cross; SSC: Silver Star Citation; KIA: Killed in action; CO: Commanding officer

== See also ==
- Organization of the Air Service of the American Expeditionary Force
- List of American Aero Squadrons
