= Amanty Airdrome =

World War I airfield in Lorraine, France

- Part of American Expeditionary Forces (AEF)
- Located near: Amanty, France
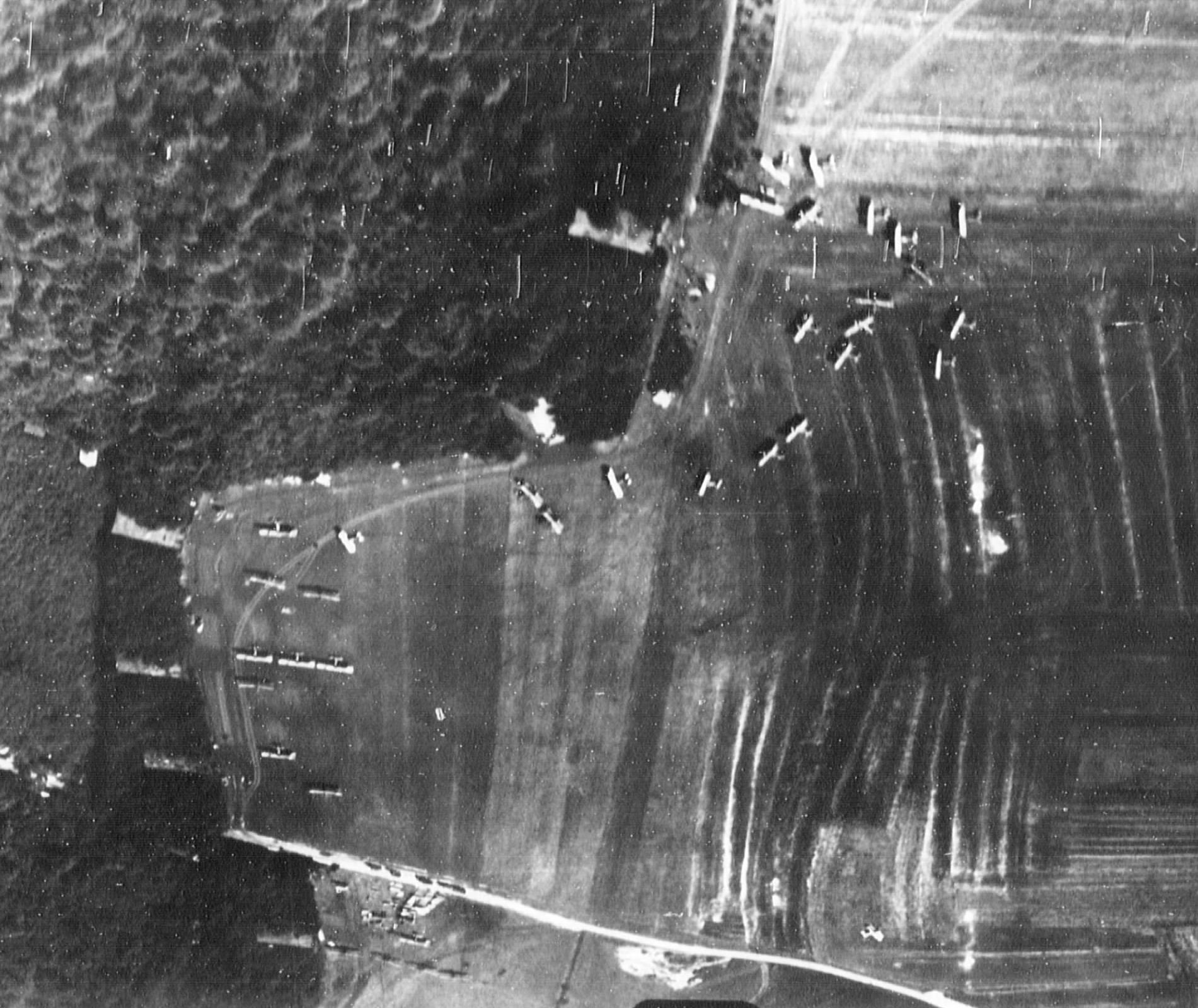
- Photo of Amanty Airdrome in 1918, looking from the southwest. Many Salmson 2A2 observation planes are parked on the grassy airfield. Note the D 168 road crossing the field. Most of the station buildings are in the forest to the north (left side of the photograph).

Site information
- Type: Training airfield
- Controlled by: Air Service, United States Army
- Condition: Agricultural area

Location
- Coordinates: 48°31′36″N 005°35′53″E

Site history
- Built: 1918
- In use: 1918–1919
- Battles/wars: World War I

Garrison information
- Garrison: 1st Observation Group School; 1st Day Bombardment Group; United States First Army Air Service

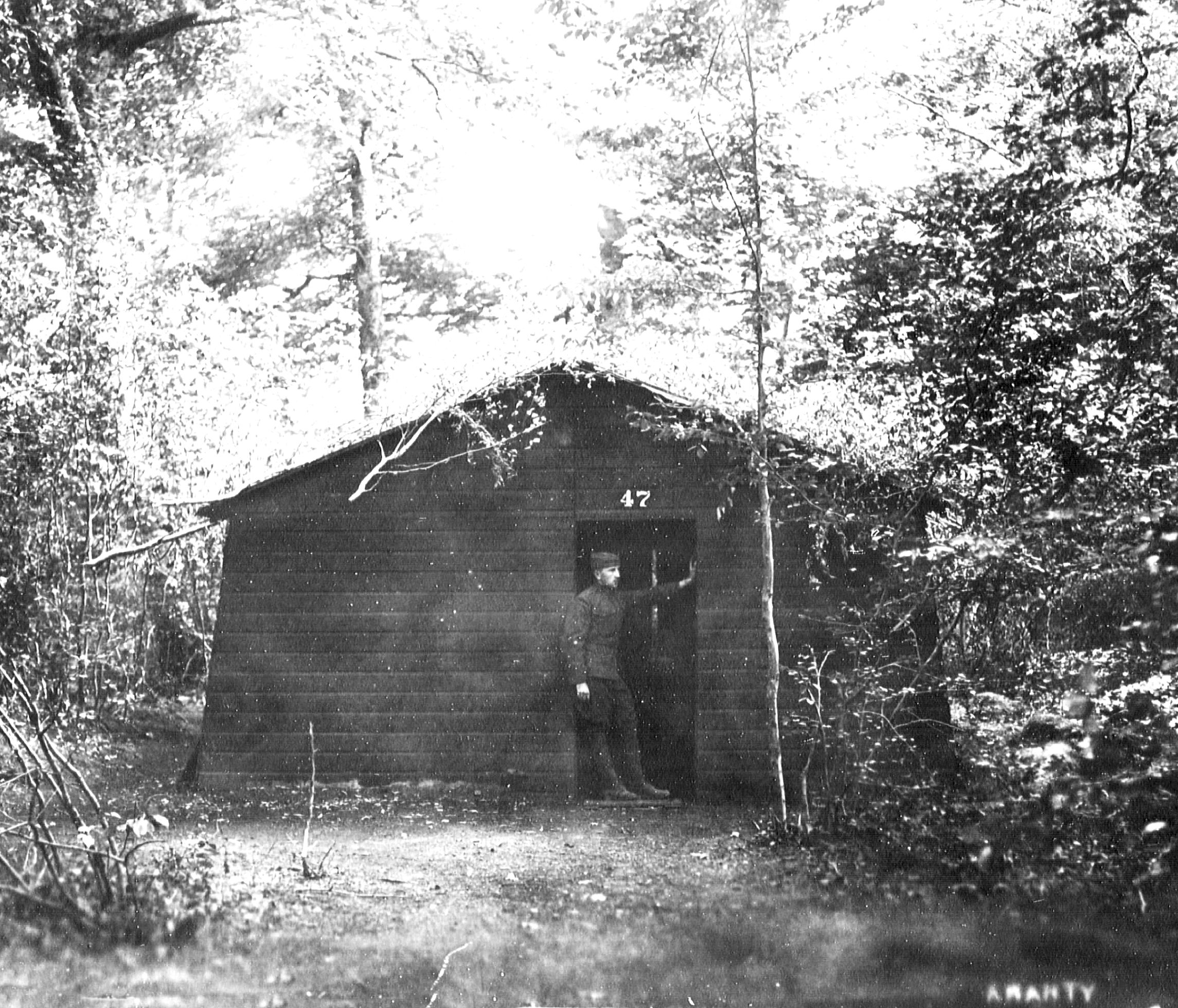
Building 47 in the woods at Amanty Airdrome

Amanty Airdrome was a temporary World War I airfield in France, used briefly by French units, thereafter by squadrons of the Air Service, United States Army. It was located 1 mile (1.6 km) northwest of Amanty, and approximately 20 miles (32 km) south west of Toul, in the Meuse department in the Lorraine region in northeastern France (48.527383,5.598371).

== History ==
The airfield was set up early 1917, with French escadrille C 4 (observation for 2nd Army Corps/French Second Army) arriving on 6 March, and staying until 2 April. The field then fell asleep until escadrille C 43 showed up on 19 Oct, teamed with the 1st Aero Squadron. Later on 14 December, they were joined by the ground personnel of 91st Aero Squadron (their pilots still training in Issoudun – they would arrive in March 1918).

The I Corps Observation Group School was organized early January 1918 on the field, the ground troops of 91st Squadron certainly used for construction works; the airfield was officially transferred to the Air Service, United States Army on February. As with most temporary airfields during World War I, it was set up quickly on existing farmer's fields which was used as an all-way airfield for aircraft takeoffs and landings. Canvas and metal tubing type hangars were erected for aircraft maintenance, and wooden buildings were set up for barracks, operations, maintenance and other station needs. 477th Aero Squadron (Construct.) stayed 12 Jun - 1 August 1918 to improve the camouflage of the installations.

The I Corps Observation Group School trained pilots and observers for aerial observation and photography. 1st Aero Squadron left on 4 April, and 91st Aero Squadron on 24 May. Thereafter, Aero Squadrons trained at the airfield were:

- 88th Aero Squadron (Observation), 1 February 1918 – 28 May 1918
- 12th Aero Squadron (Observation), 2 February 1918 – 30 April 1918
- 90th Aero Squadron (Observation), 19 April 1918 – 13 June 1918
- 96th Aero Squadron (Observation), 18 May 1918 – 10 September 1918
- 135th Aero Squadron (Observation), 19 Jul 1918 – 30 Jul 1918
- 50th Aero Squadron (Observation), 27 July 1918 – 4 September 1918
- 8th Aero Squadron (Observation), 31 Jul 1918 – 31 Aug 1918
- 104th Aero Squadron (Observation), 1 August 1918 –– 4 August 1918
- 9th Aero Squadron (Observation), 28 August 1918 – 6 September 1918

After completion of training, the squadrons then were assigned to one of the American Army Corps Observation Groups, mainly for battlefield reconnaissance and observation duties.

A few Squadrons flew operational missions from the field:

- 12th Aero Squadron (Observation), 30 April 1918 – 3 May 1918
- 96th Aero Squadron (Observation), 12 June 1918 – 10 September 1918
- 9th Aero Squadron (Observation), 6 – 21 September 1918
- 99th Aero Squadron (Observation), 31 May 1918 – 1 July 1918

Beginning in September 1918, the 1st Day Bombardment Group moved to Amanty and began combat operations during the Meuse-Argonne Offensive.

- 1st Day Bombardment Group, 10 Sep – 23 Sep 1918
- 11th Aero Squadron (Day Bombardment), 6 Sep 1918 – 24 Sep 1918
- 96th Aero Squadron (Day Bombardment), 18 May 1918 – 23 September 1918
- 166th Aero Squadron (Day Bombardment), 21 September 1918 – 25 September 1918

With the advance of Allied forces, the group moved up to Maulan Aerodrome to be closer to the line, and Amanty was no longer occupied flying units. After the Armistice with Germany on 11 November 1918, the First Army Air Service remained in place until it was ordered demobilized in April 1919. Afterwards Amanty Airdrome was dismantled, and the airfield was returned to the local farmers for agricultural use. Today little or no traces of it remain.

== See also ==
- List of Air Service American Expeditionary Force aerodromes in France
- List of Training Section Air Service airfields
