= Doulcon =

- Commune
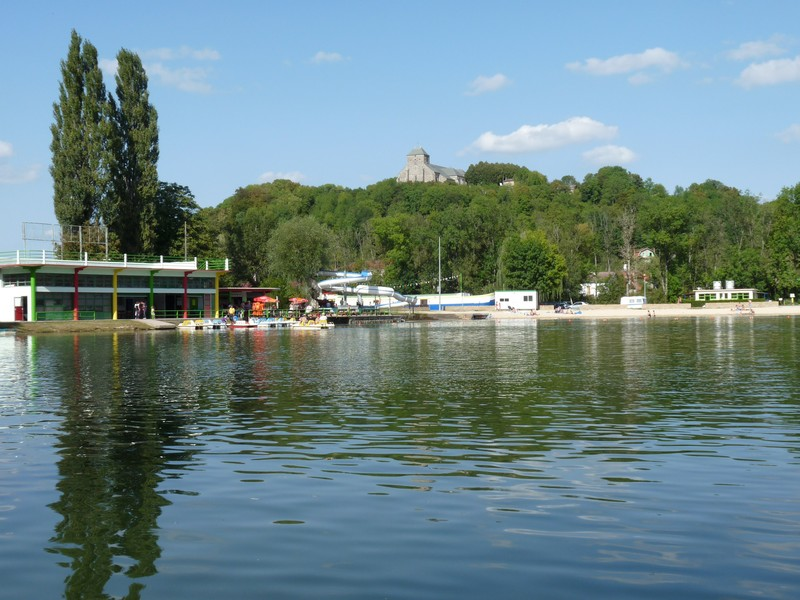
- The lake, with the old citadel of Dun-sur-Meuse in the background, in Doulcon

- Coat of arms
- Location of Doulcon
- Location within France Location within Grand Est
- Coordinates: 49°22′56″N 5°10′14″E
- Country: France
- Region: Grand Est
- Department: Meuse
- Arrondissement: Verdun
- Canton: Stenay
- Intercommunality: CC du Pays de Stenay et du Val Dunois

Government
  - Mayor (2020–2026): Alain Plun
- Area^{1}: 8.57 km^{2} (3.31 sq mi)
- Elevation: 175 m (574 ft)
- Highest elevation: 305 m (1,001 ft)
- Lowest elevation: 171 m (561 ft)
- Population (2023): 421
  - Density: 49.1/km^{2} (127/sq mi)
- Demonym: doulconais
- Time zone: UTC+01:00 (CET)
  - Summer (DST): UTC+02:00 (CEST)
- INSEE/Postal code: 55165 /55110
- ^{1} French Land Register data, which excludes lakes, ponds, glaciers > 1 km^{2} (0.386 sq mi or 247 acres) and river estuaries.

Doulcon (French pronunciation: [dulkɔ̃]) is a commune in the Meuse department in Grand Est in north-eastern France.

== See also ==
- Communes of the Meuse department
