= Delouze Aerodrome =

- Part of American Expeditionary Forces (AEF)
- Located near: Delouze-Rosières, France
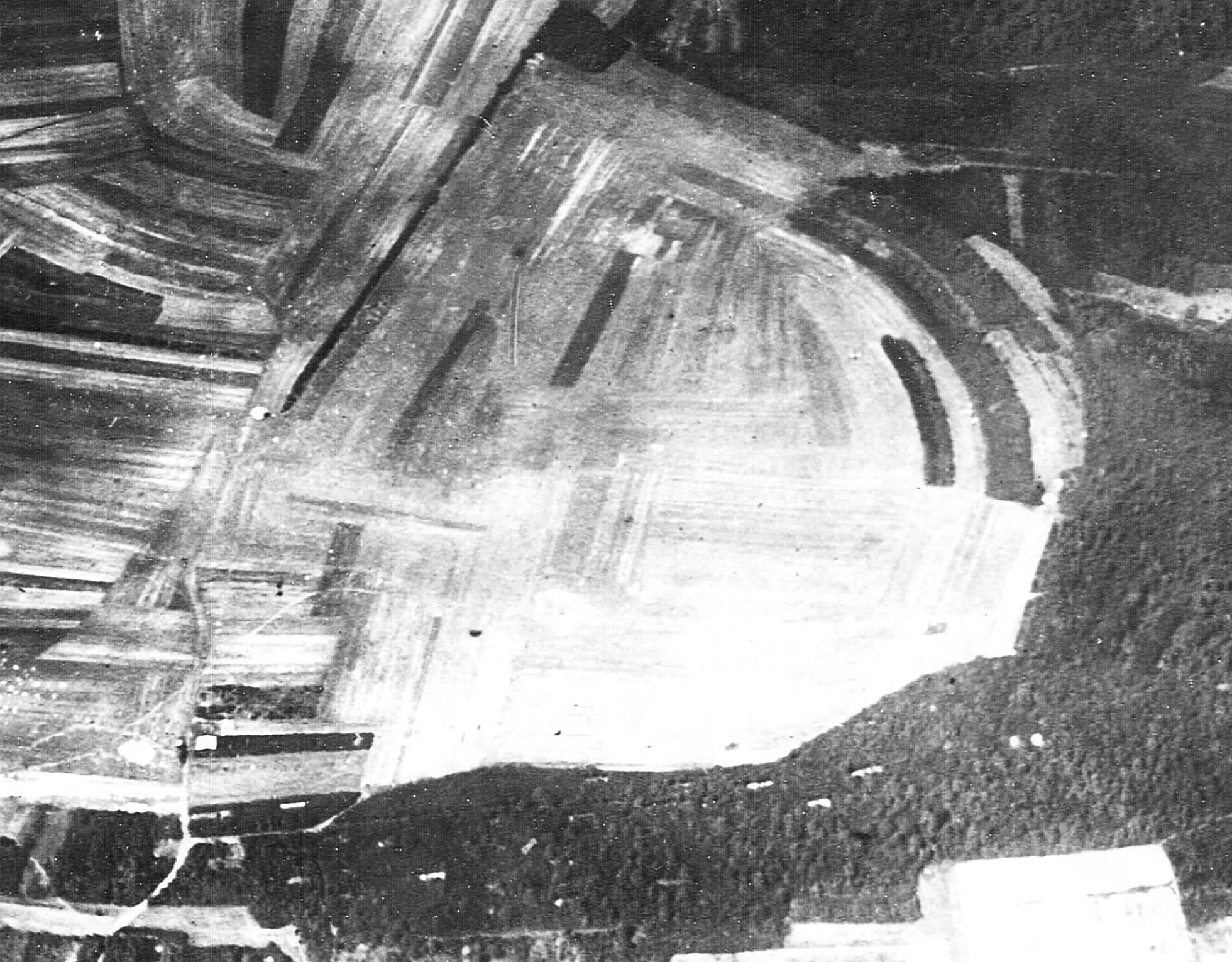
- Delouze Aerodrome looking northwestwards. Note the numerous buildings in the forest, at the bottom of the photo, to the south of the open airfield, using cut agricultural fields, their furrow lines evident.

Site information
- Type: Combat Airfield
- Controlled by: Air Service, United States Army
- Condition: Agricultural area

Location
- Coordinates: 48°34′18″N 005°32′03″E

Site history
- Built: 1918
- In use: 1918–1919
- Battles/wars: World War I

Garrison information
- Garrison: 1st Day Bombardment Group; United States First Army Air Service

Delouze Aerodrome was a temporary World War I airfield in France, used by the Air Service, United States Army. It was located 0.8 miles (1.3 km) NE of Delouze-Rosières, in the Meuse department in Lorraine in north-eastern France, and is approximately 25 miles (40 km) west-southwest of Toul.

== Overview ==
A lease was signed by the Air Service for 210 acres of land on 21 December 1917. Delouze Aerodrome was designed to be the home of four 'Day Bombardment' squadrons, but construction of the aerodrome did not begin until the middle of April 1918 due to labor shortages. Works been done by the 462nd Aero Squadron (Construction), which stayed at Delouze from 29 April to 20 August 1918. Engineers began to erect a total of 26 buildings for barracks and a mess hall, and two additional buildings for maintenance shops. The ground station was built in the woods to the northeast of the airfield, to camouflage the facility. A headquarters complex of ten buildings and a hospital that constituted of a Nissen hut was erected, along with a telephone and electrical system. To shelter the aircraft, sixteen French Bessonneau aircraft hangars were erected at the field.

Eventually, the airfield saw three Dayton-Wright DH-4 bomber squadrons of the First Army Air Service landing on 26 August 1918. They had already all three departed to Amanty Aerodrome on 7 September, three days before the 1st (day) Bombardment Group was effectively formed. Known units that were stationed there were:

- 166th Aero Squadron (Day Bombardment, 1st Army AS), 26 August – 1 September 1918; back (1st BG/1st Army) on 7–12 September 1918
- 11th Aero Squadron (Day Bombardment, 1st Army AS), 26 August – 6 September 1918
- 20th Aero Squadron (Day Bombardment, 1st Army AS), 26 August – 7 September 1918
- 100th Aero Squadron (Day Bombardment, 1st Army, then HQ/AEF), 16 August – 26 October 1918.
- 163d Aero Squadron (Day Bombardment), 30 September – 1 November 1918.

All the squadrons had already left the airfield when the Armistice was signed on 11 November 1918. It was soon abandoned and turned over to the 1st Air Depot for de-construction. All hangars and other structures were dismantled and all useful supplies and equipment were removed and sent back to the Depot for storage. Upon completion, the land turned over to the French government.

Eventually the land was returned to agricultural use by the local farmers. Today, what was Delouze Airdrome is a series of cultivated fields located just to the northwest of Rosiers en Blois, with no indications of its wartime use.

== See also ==
- List of Air Service American Expeditionary Force aerodromes in France
