= Amanty =

- Commune
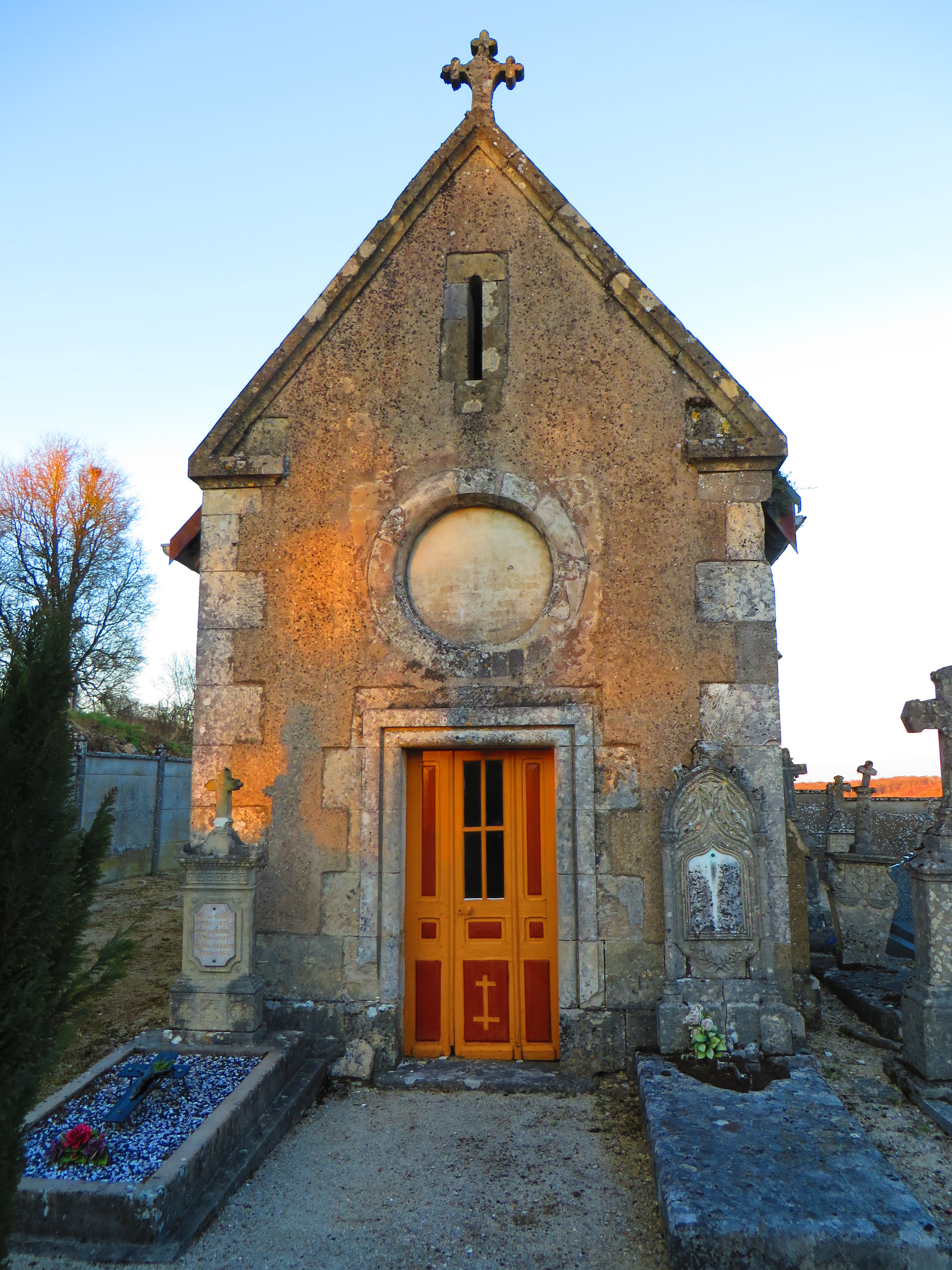
- The chapel in Amanty

- Coat of arms
- Location of Amanty
- Location within France Location within Grand Est
- Coordinates: 48°31′08″N 5°36′44″E
- Country: France
- Region: Grand Est
- Department: Meuse
- Arrondissement: Commercy
- Canton: Ligny-en-Barrois
- Intercommunality: Portes de Meuse

Government
  - Mayor (2020–2026): Jean-Luc Diotisalvi
- Area^{1}: 11.17 km^{2} (4.31 sq mi)
- Elevation: 350 m (1,150 ft)
- Highest elevation: 426 m (1,398 ft)
- Lowest elevation: 295 m (968 ft)
- Population (2023): 36
  - Density: 3.2/km^{2} (8.3/sq mi)
- Time zone: UTC+01:00 (CET)
  - Summer (DST): UTC+02:00 (CEST)
- INSEE/Postal code: 55005 /55130
- ^{1} French Land Register data, which excludes lakes, ponds, glaciers > 1 km^{2} (0.386 sq mi or 247 acres) and river estuaries.

Amanty (French pronunciation: [amɑ̃ti]) is a commune in the Meuse department in the Grand Est region in northeastern France. It is located approximately 20 miles (32 km) south west of Toul.

== Population ==
Historical population
| Year | Pop. | ±% p.a. |
|---|---|---|
| 1968 | 66 | — |
| 1975 | 62 | −0.89% |
| 1982 | 58 | −0.95% |
| 1990 | 56 | −0.44% |
| 1999 | 47 | −1.93% |
| 2007 | 53 | +1.51% |
| 2012 | 45 | −3.22% |
| 2017 | 40 | −2.33% |
| 2023 | 36 | −1.74% |
Source: INSEE

== See also ==
- Communes of the Meuse department
