= Guîtres =

- Commune
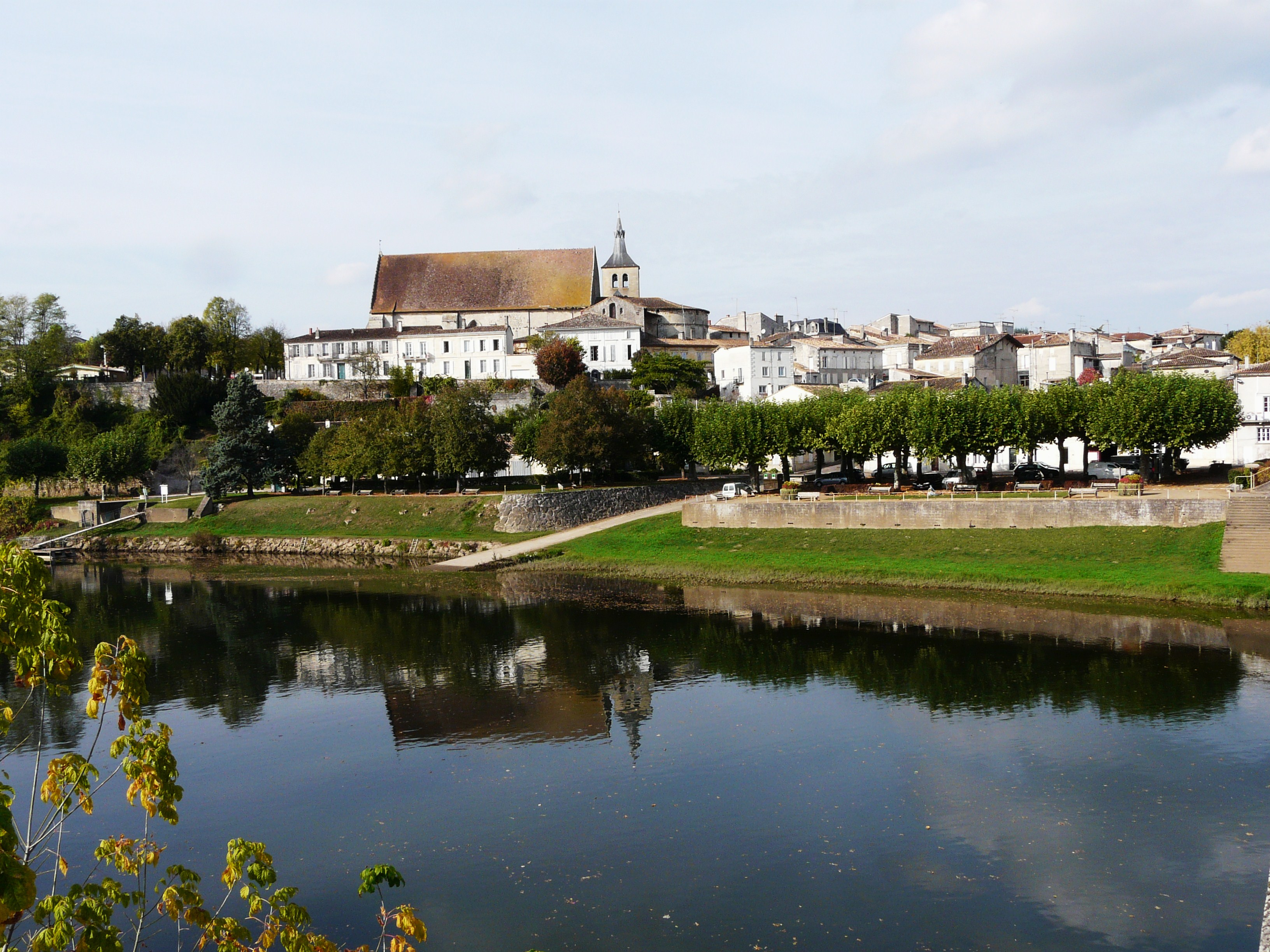
- A general view of Guîtres

- Coat of arms
- Location of Guîtres
- Location within France Location within Nouvelle-Aquitaine
- Coordinates: 45°02′31″N 0°11′07″W
- Country: France
- Region: Nouvelle-Aquitaine
- Department: Gironde
- Arrondissement: Libourne
- Canton: Le Nord-Libournais
- Intercommunality: CA Libournais

Government
  - Mayor (2020–2026): Hervé Alloy
- Area^{1}: 5.02 km^{2} (1.94 sq mi)
- Elevation: 12 m (39 ft)
- Highest elevation: 70 m (230 ft)
- Lowest elevation: 2 m (6.6 ft)
- Population (2023): 1,631
  - Density: 325/km^{2} (841/sq mi)
- Time zone: UTC+01:00 (CET)
  - Summer (DST): UTC+02:00 (CEST)
- INSEE/Postal code: 33198 /33230
- ^{1} French Land Register data, which excludes lakes, ponds, glaciers > 1 km^{2} (0.386 sq mi or 247 acres) and river estuaries.

Guîtres (French pronunciation: [ɡitʁ]) is a commune in the Gironde department in southwestern France.

== Population ==
Historical population
Year	Pop.	±% p.a.
1968	1,279	—
1975	1,357	+0.85%
1982	1,377	+0.21%
1990	1,403	+0.23%
1999	1,478	+0.58%
2007	1,560	+0.68%
2012	1,690	+1.61%
2017	1,589	−1.22%
2023	1,631	+0.44%
Source: INSEE

== See also ==
- Communes of the Gironde department
