= Maulan Aerodrome =

Temporary World War I airfield in France

- Part of American Expeditionary Forces (AEF)
- Located near: Bar-le-Duc, France
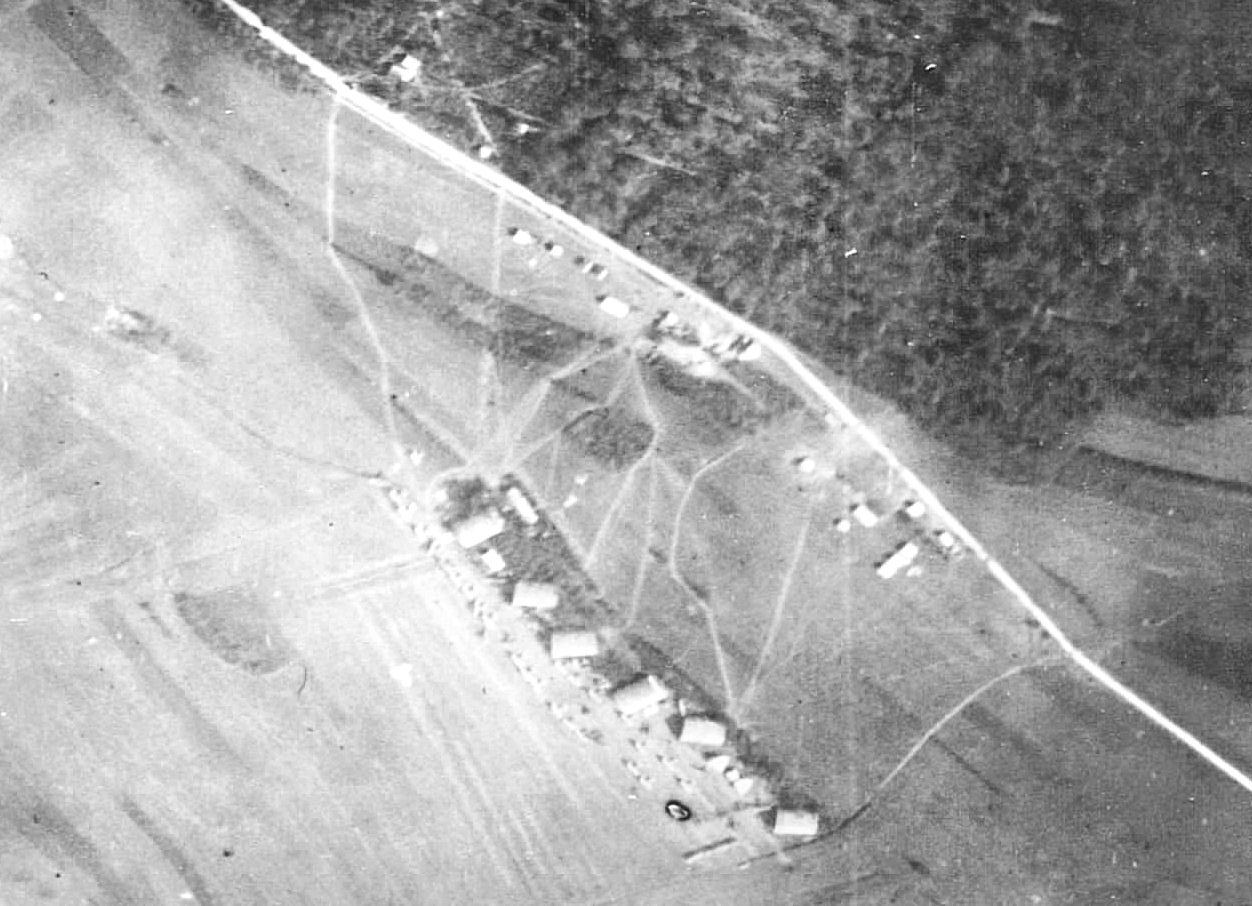
- Maulan Aerodrome, France. Note the six tent and frame hangars at the airfield, with the squadrons' DH-4s lined up in front. Trails made by vehicles in the field show the routes taken to the station area and personnel tents along the road to Maulan

Site information
- Type: Combat Airfield
- Controlled by: Air Service, United States Army
- Condition: Agricultural area

Location
- Coordinates: 48°39′57″N 005°14′37″E

Site history
- Built: 1918
- In use: 1918–1919
- Battles/wars: World War I

Garrison information
- Garrison: 1st Day Bombardment Group; United States First Army Air Service

Maulan Aerodrome, was a temporary World War I airfield in France, used by French units, and later by squadrons of the Air Service, United States Army. It was located 11 miles (18 km) south of the prefecture of Bar-le-Duc, in the Meuse department in Lorraine in north-eastern France.

== Overview ==
A small airfield was set up in September, 1914 by the French "Aeronautique Militaire" at "Le Petit Maulan", but soon to be wrecked by a storm and given up.

Then, a French flying unit, escadrille F 25 (French 2nd Army) spent few months (31 March - 16 September) in 1917 at "Maulan" and again three weeks (14 March - 5 April) in 1918 as VR 25, this time been "barracked", with seems to imply that an airfield had been organized at least early in 1918 in Maulan before the Air Service, United States Army squadrons arrived in the area, 2 miles further south from the initial spot of "Le Petit Maulan", at the west rim of the wood of Charmois.

After some works performed by a detachment of 484th Aero Squadron (Construct.) on 1–11 September, Maulan was used as a main operating base by the 1st Day Bombardment Group during both the St. Mihiel and Meuse-Argonne Offensives, with four squadrons of aircraft (11th, 20th, 96th and 166th) from 23 September onwards.

In support of the flying squadrons, the 4th Air Park's 648th Aero Squadron had a flight of mechanics for repair of both aircraft and vehicles. Also, the airfield was the home of Photo Section #12 for processing and analyzing aerial photography. The ground support station consisted of various aircraft hangars, support buildings and quarters for personnel, primarily in the woods to the north and west of the field.

After the armistice, the 1st Day Bombardment Group stayed there until 17 January 1919, when its HQ and three remaining squadrons moved to Colombey les Belles to be demob'ed. The airfield was then soon returned to agricultural use.

The first airfield of "Le Petit Maulan" was 1/2 miles south of Maulan, along the RN 4, and the larger - as already said - was a further 2 miles south, by the wood of Charmois. Today, both are cultivated fields, with no indications of their wartime use.

== Known units assigned ==
- Headquarters, 1st Day Bombardment Group, 25 September-11 November 1918
- 11th Aero Squadron (Day Bombardment), 24 September 1918 – 17 January 1919
- 20th Aero Squadron (Day Bombardment), 23 September 1918 – 16 January 1919
- 96th Aero Squadron (Day Bombardment), 23 September 1918 – 10 January 1919
- 166th Aero Squadron (Dau Bombardment), 25 September-22 November 1918

== See also ==
- List of Air Service American Expeditionary Force aerodromes in France
