= St. Maixent Replacement Barracks =

Former military facility in France

Air Service Replacement Concentration Barracks
- Part of American Expeditionary Forces (AEF)
- Located near: St. Maixent, France
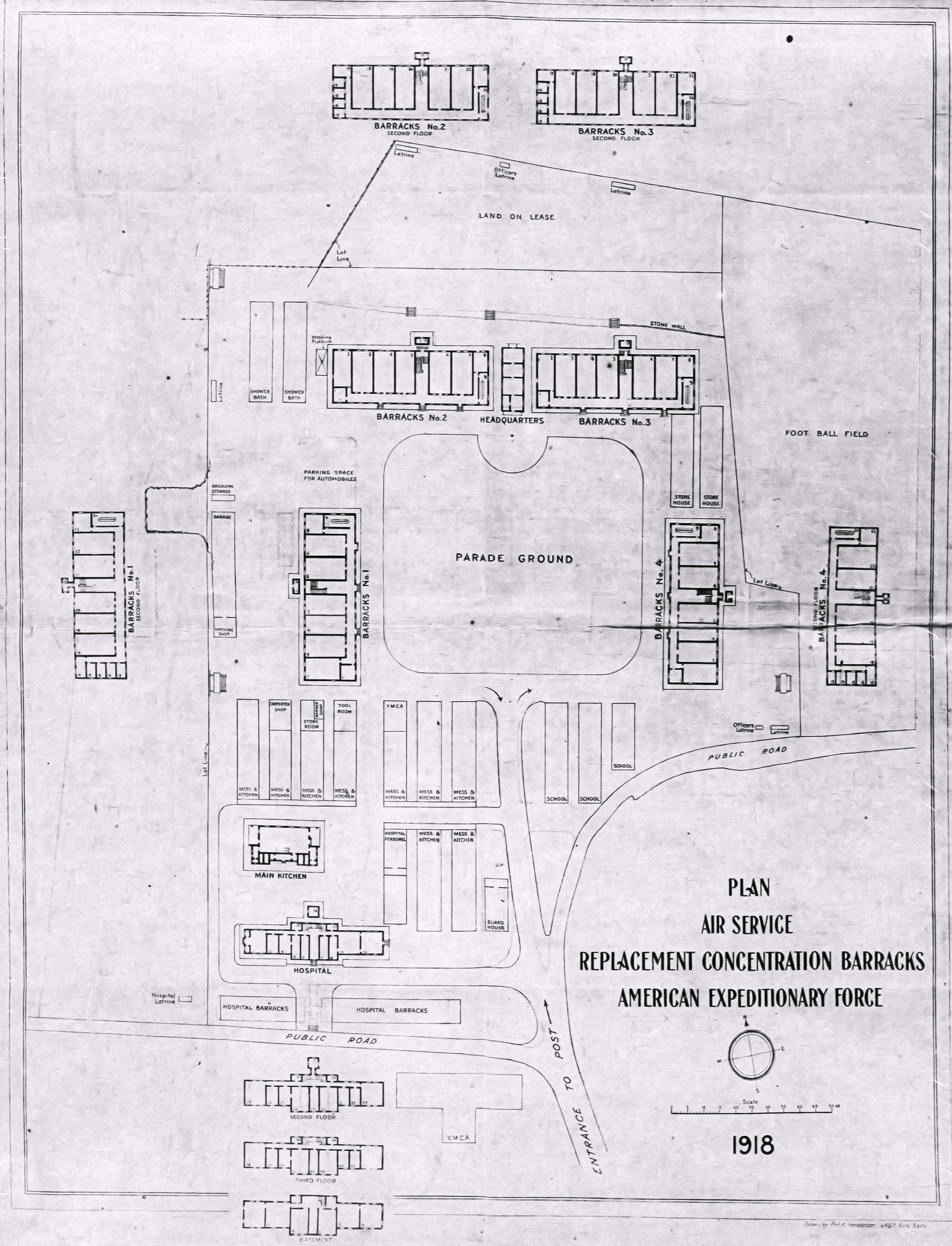
- Plan of Air Service Replacement Concentration Barracks (click for high resolution)

Site information
- Type: Replacement Complex
- Controlled by: Air Service, United States Army
- Condition: Urban area of Saint-Maixent-l'École

Location
- Coordinates: 46°24′52″N 000°12′38″W

Site history
- Built: 1917
- In use: 1917-1919
- Battles/wars: World War I

The Air Service Replacement Concentration Barracks is a former military facility in the vicinity of Saint-Maixent-l'École, Poitou-Charentes, France. It was used by the Air Service, United States Army as the Air Service Replacement Concentration Barracks during World War I. From the facility, Air Service personnel were sent into combat on the Western Front.

== History ==
=== Origins ===
After the initial elements of the Air Service began deploying to France in 1917, arrangements were made with the French Government for where large numbers of airmen, at the time undergoing training in the United States, France or England would be received in France and be organized for service.

In December 1917, the French Government suggested Saint-Maixent-l'École in the Poitou-Charentes region. A survey was made of the facilities and arrangements were finalized for Air Service Barracks #3, Base Section #2, which was later changed to the St. Maixent Replacement Barracks.

When France was invaded in 1914, the French Army quartered a regiment of the 114th Infantry at Denfert Barracks and partially Canclaux Barracks in St. Maixent; the latter being a former Benedictine Monastery occupied by the French Army since the French Revolution in the late 18th Century. Another building, named the Presbytere Barracks had been used for the previous ten years on a part-time basis for casual quartering and detachments passing through St. Maixent. A new group of buildings, Coiffee Barracks (Site "A") 46°24′52″N 000°12′38″W was under construction and completed in 1916. The Americans were the first to occupy them. These, along with the Presbytere Barracks (Site "B") 46°24′47″N 000°12′13″W and Canclaux (Site "C") 46°24′38″N 000°12′13″W were accepted for use by the Air Service.

=== Initial operations ===
The first cadre of Air Service personnel to arrive and begin setting up the facilities for use arrived on 4 December 1917. Construction of kitchens and mess facilities, improvements to the barracks and parade grounds commenced. Additional station personnel arrived on 16 December. On 1 January 1918, the first fourteen Aero Squadrons arrived. Four were quartered in the Coiffee Barracks; four in Presbytere and the balance at Canclaux Barracks.

Initially the station was used principally as a receiving location for newly arrived personnel in France. On 1 June 1918, its mission radically changed. It became a staging depot for classification of enlisted personnel and re-organization of existing squadrons. It also became the site of four important schools for commissioned officers. It became the policy of the Air Service in France for all units to proceed directly to St. Maixent upon their arrival in France.

Enlisted personnel were given a thorough trade test on arrival. Upon completion and qualifications verified, Aero Squadrons were re-organized in accordance with the tables of organization developed by the Air Service in France. They were then equipped and given instructions on the use of Gas Masks and qualified in their use before being deployed to the Zone of Advance (Combat area). Four Officer's schools were established as follows:

- Adjutants' School
- Supply Officers' School
- Engineer Officers' School
- Flying Officers' School

These were refresher courses for training previously received, with intensely practical training pertaining to conditions they would encounter in France. In case a squadron was being prepared for early assignment to the Zone of Advance, a squadron commander nominated by an Air Service commander and approved by the Chief of Air Service was usually sent to join this command at St. Maixent. The squadron, as soon as it was in readiness, then moved to a training center or to the acceptance field at Orly Airport, Paris or to the Air Service Production Center No. 2 at Romorantin Aerodrome for temporary duty in order that men in specialized trades might get some familiarity with their duties.

Each squadron then proceed to the 1st Air Depot at Colombey-les-Belles Airdrome; their date of departure being determined by the availability of its equipment and flying personnel. The squadron supply officer with a detachment was sent to a supply warehouse to collect the squadron equipment and accompany it to the point of assembly. Pilots and observers were collected at the 1st Air Depot. The squadron commander, with a nucleus of officers and soldiers preceded the remainder of the squadron to prepare for its coming and to assure himself that the airplanes and squadron were in readiness.

Upon its arrival in the Zone of Advance, the squadron reported to general headquarters, G-3 for assignment to an Army. Squadrons assigned to Instructional Centers went directly from St. Maxient to their assigned Center.

== See also ==
- List of United States Air Service aerodromes in France
