= Robert F. Travis =

United States Air Force general (1904–1950)

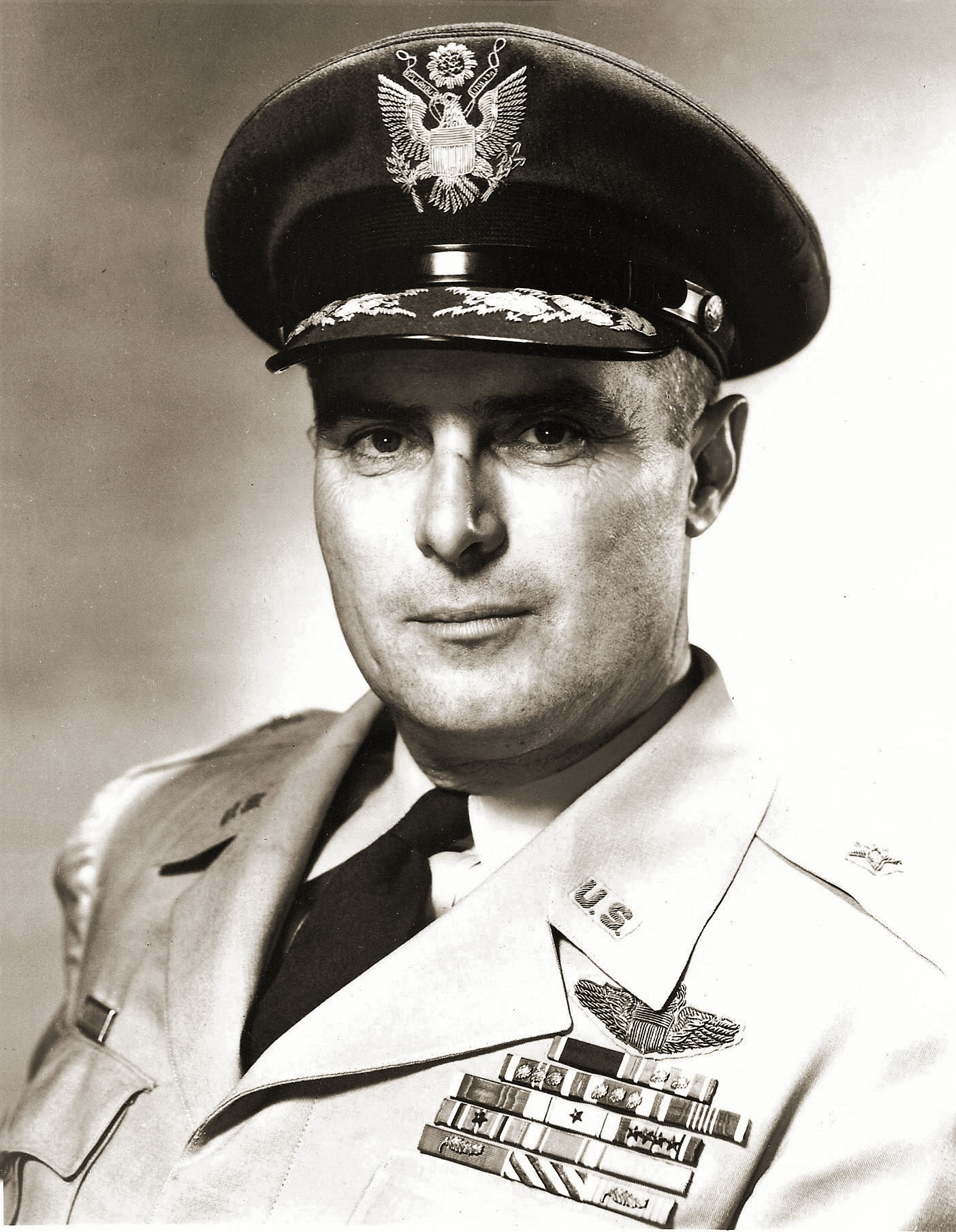
- Brigadier General Robert F. Travis, USAF
- Born: 26 December 1904; Savannah, Georgia
- Died: 5 August 1950 (aged 45); Fairfield-Suisun AFB, California
- Burial place: Arlington National Cemetery
- Military career
- Allegiance: United States
- Branch: United States Army Air Corps; United States Air Force
- Service years: 1928–1950
- Rank: Brigadier General
- Service number: 0-17187; 373A
- Commands: 5th Strategic Reconnaissance Wing; 9th Strategic Reconnaissance Wing; 7th Air Division; 17th Bombardment Training Wing; 15th Bombardment Training Wing; 41st Combat Bombardment Wing; I Bomber Command; 29th Bombardment Group; 43d Bombardment Squadron
- Conflicts: World War II; Korean War
- Awards: Distinguished Service Cross; Silver Star (3); Distinguished Flying Cross (4); Purple Heart; Air Medal(4); Army Commendation Medal; Legion of Honor (France); Croix de Guerre (France); Distinguished Flying Cross (United Kingdom); Croix de Guerre (Belgium)

Brigadier General Robert Falligant Travis (26 December 1904 – 5 August 1950) was a United States Army Air Forces general during World War II.

A 1928 graduate of the United States Military Academy at West Point, New York, Travis saw action as commander of the Eighth Air Force's 41st Combat Bombardment Wing, based at RAF Molesworth in England. He personally led 35 combat missions over Nazi-occupied Europe, including a costly raid on a fighter plant in Oschersleben, Germany, on 11 January 1944, for which the wing received a Distinguished Unit Citation. His decorations included the Distinguished Service Cross, the Silver Star with two oak leaf clusters, the Distinguished Flying Cross with three oak leaf clusters, and the Purple Heart.

Travis was killed in the crash of a B-29 Superfortress at Fairfield-Suisun Air Force Base near Fairfield, California. The base was named for him the following year.

== Early career ==
At West Point in 1928

Robert Falligant Travis was born in Savannah, Georgia, on 26 December 1904, the son of Robert Jessie Travis, a lawyer who reached the rank of major general in the Georgia National Guard, and his wife Rena née Falligant. He had a younger brother, William Livingston, and two sisters, Rena and Cecilia.

Travis entered the University of Georgia in Athens in 1924, but received an appointment to the United States Military Academy at West Point, New York, which he entered on 1 July 1924. He graduated on 9 June 1928 and was commissioned a second lieutenant in the Field Artillery, ranking 115th out of 261 in class of 1928. His brother, William, graduated 53d in the class of 1933, and would eventually reach the rank of colonel in the United States Air Force.

Travis commenced flight training on 1 September 1928 at the Air Corps Primary Flying School at Brooks Field, Texas. On completion of the course he attended the Air Corps Advanced Flying School at Kelly Field, Texas. On 15 November 1929, he was posted to the 1st Observation Squadron at Mitchel Field, New York, as an engineering officer. He was transferred to the Air Corps on 21 November 1929. From 19 July 1932 to 7 August 1933 he was a student at the Air Corps Engineering School at Wright Field in Dayton, Ohio. He then joined the 59th Service Squadron at Langley Field, Virginia, as its supply engineering and operations officer.

From February to May 1934, during the Air Mail scandal, Travis served as the engineering inspector for the Eastern Zone of the Army Air Corps Mail Operation (AACMO) based at Floyd Bennett Field, Brooklyn, and Mitchel Field, Long Island, in New York. Upon completion of this assignment, he returned to Langley Field, where he became the engineering and armament officer of the 49th Bombardment Squadron, 2d Bombardment Group, in December 1934. In March 1935, he was made a flight commander in the 49th Bombardment Squadron. By October 1937, he transferred to the headquarters staff of the 2nd Bombardment Group as the group intelligence and armament officer. He was promoted to first lieutenant on 1 June 1934, and was temporary captain from 20 April 1935 to 16 June 1936. He was promoted to captain again on 9 June 1938.

== World War II ==
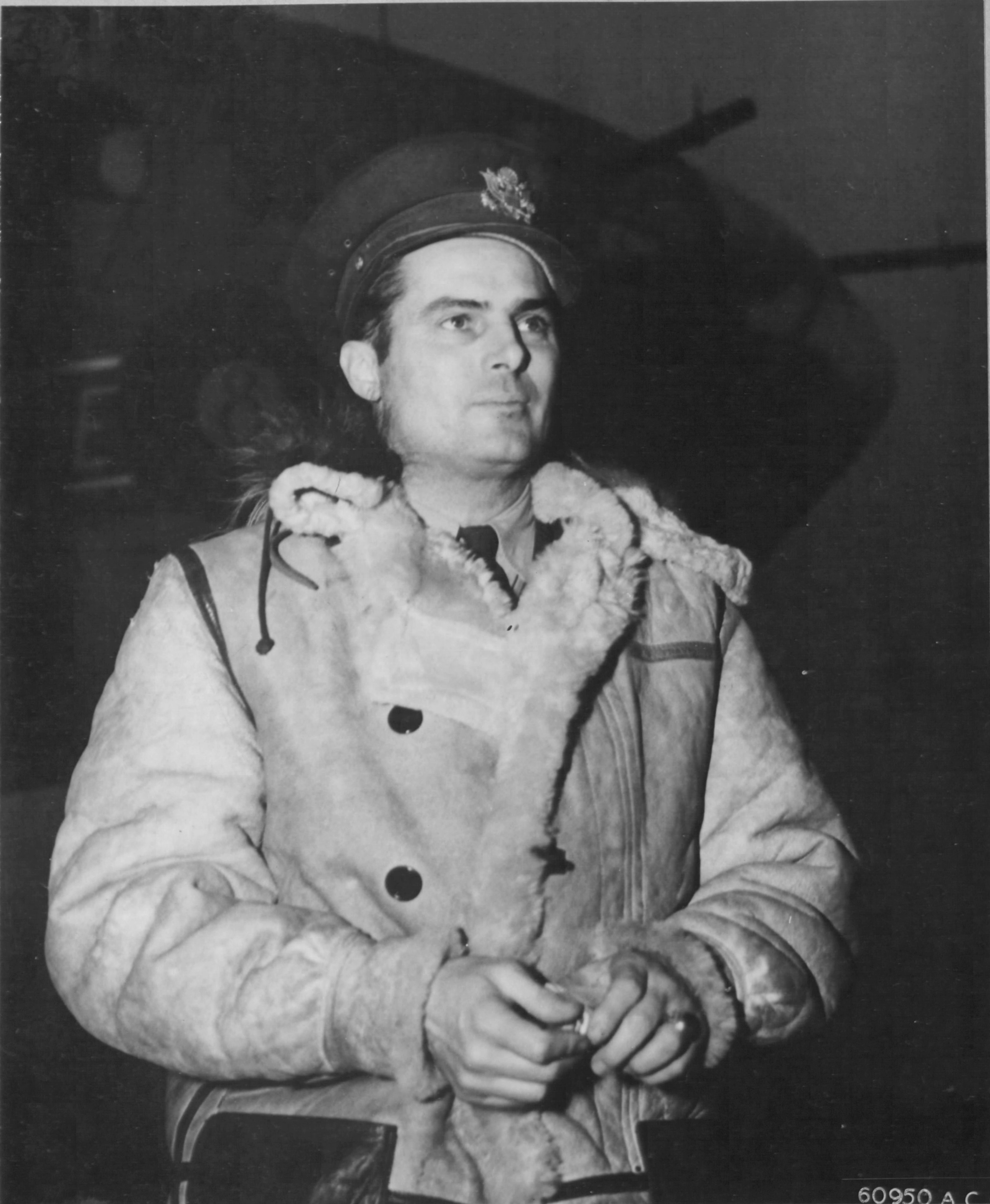
Travis beside a B-17 'The 8 Ball' during World War II (1944)

In March 1939, Travis went to the 72d Bombardment Squadron at Hickam Field, Hawaii, to serve as operations officer and a flight commander. In July 1939, he became its commanding officer. He then became materiel officer of the 5th Bombardment Group in September 1940, and was promoted to major on 31 January 1941. In May 1941, he returned to the United States, where he was assigned to the 29th Bombardment Group at MacDill Field, Florida, as the commanding officer of the 43d Bombardment Squadron. He was subsequently elevated to Executive Officer and then commander of the 29th Bombardment Group, with the rank of lieutenant colonel from 5 January 1942, and colonel from 1 March 1942. He moved with the 29th Bombardment Group in June 1942, when it was relocated to Gowen Field in Boise, Idaho. In September 1942, he became the commanding officer of the 15th Bombardment Training Wing at Gowen Field. He moved with it to Sioux City Army Air Base in Iowa, in February 1943. He was promoted to brigadier general on 4 May 1943. In July, he became the Commanding General of the I Bomber Command at El Paso Army Airfield in Texas.

Travis was next assigned to the European Theater of Operations, and assumed command of the 41st Combat Bombardment Wing of the Eighth Air Force based at RAF Molesworth in England on 16 September 1943. Flying the Boeing B-17 Flying Fortress, Travis flew 35 missions over enemy-occupied territory, including a mission to destroy the Focke-Wulf AGO Flugzeugwerke fighter plant in Oschersleben, Germany, on 11 January 1944, for which the wing received a Distinguished Unit Citation. The Eighth Air Force lost 60 bombers that day, 34 of them in the attack on Oschersleben. For his services as commander of 41st Combat Bombardment Wing, he was awarded the Distinguished Service Cross, the Silver Star with two oak leaf clusters, the Distinguished Flying Cross with three oak leaf clusters, Air Medal with three oak leaf clusters, the Army Commendation Medal and the Purple Heart.

Travis returned to the United States in October 1944 and was named Commanding General of the 17th Bombardment Training Wing at Grand Island Army Airfield in Nebraska. The wing later moved to Sioux City Army Air Base in Iowa. In August 1945, he was assigned to command the Sioux Falls Army Air Field in South Dakota.

== Post-war career ==
Travis was deputy commander of the Fourteenth Air Force at Orlando Air Force Base in Florida from May to September 1946, when he entered the National War College. He graduated in June 1947, and in September he became the deputy commander of the Seventh Air Force at Hickam Air Force Base in Hawaii. He assumed command of the 7th Air Division (formally the Seventh Air Force) there in May 1948. In September 1948, he was appointed Commanding General of the Pacific Air Command at Hickam. On 17 June 1949, he became the Commanding General of the 9th Strategic Reconnaissance Wing at Fairfield-Suisun Air Force Base, California. He assumed command of the 5th Strategic Reconnaissance Wing on 8 November 1949, commanding both wings at the base.

In July 1950, soon after the outbreak of the Korean War, the Joint Chiefs of Staff decided to send ten nuclear-capable B-29 Superfortress bombers to Guam as a deterrent to a Chinese attack on Taiwan, and possible future use in Korea. They were loaded with Mark 4 nuclear bombs, but without the fissile cores. Travis was one of twenty passengers and crewmen on board B-29 Superfortress 44-87651 when it commenced take off from Fairfield-Suisun at 2200 on 5 August 1950. The plane was piloted by Captain Eugene Q. Steffes, with First Lieutenant Carter W. Johnson as his co-pilot and Technical Sergeant Donald W. Moore as his flight engineer.

As the plane reached a speed of 125 miles per hour (201 km/h) about three quarters of the way down the 8,000-foot (2,400 m) runway with the propellers rotating at 2,800 rpm, the number two propeller suddenly went up to 3,500 rpm. Steffes ordered the propeller feathered. The aircraft lifted off at an airspeed of 155 miles per hour (249 km/h), but the landing gear failed to retract. Then the number three propeller suddenly went to 3,500 rpm. Moore reduced its speed to 2,800 rpm by reducing the manifold pressure. The drag caused by the landing gear reduced the plane's speed to 145 miles per hour (233 km/h). The crew attempted an emergency landing. The plane turned around but lost lift, and crashed at 120 miles per hour (190 km/h).

The plane broke up on landing, and burst into flames. All ten people in the rear compartment died in the crash, but eight of the ten in the nose section, which broke off, escaped. Travis was pulled alive from the wreckage but died on his way to hospital. The high explosives in the bomb detonated during the fire 20 minutes after the crash, spreading wreckage and burning fuel over a wide area. An additional seven people who were not part of the crew died on the ground in the explosion.

The 19 bodies were taken to the McCune Garden Chapel in Vacaville. Travis was buried at Arlington National Cemetery with full military honors on 16 August 1950. He was survived by his wife, Jane Frances Travis, who was interred with him after she died on 22 November 1987, and his four children: Jayne, Robert, John and Roger. Fairfield-Suisun Air Force Base was officially renamed Travis Air Force Base in his honor on 20 October 1950. A formal renaming ceremony was held on 20 April 1951, presided over by the Governor of California, Earl Warren, which was attended by Travis' family.

== Awards and decorations ==
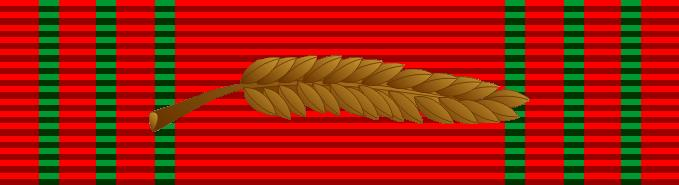
Command pilot
Distinguished Service Cross
Silver Star with two oak leaf clusters
Distinguished Flying Cross with three oak leaf clusters
Purple Heart
Air Medal with three oak leaf clusters
Army Commendation Medal
Distinguished Unit Citation
American Defense Service Medal with bronze service star
American Campaign Medal with bronze service star
European-African-Middle Eastern Campaign Medal with four service stars
World War II Victory Medal
National Defense Service Medal
Air Force Longevity Service Award with four oak leaf clusters
Legion of Honor, grade of Chevalier (France)
Croix de Guerre with palm (France)
Distinguished Flying Cross (United Kingdom)
Croix de Guerre with palm (Belgium)

=== Distinguished Service Cross citation ===

Travis, Robert F.
Brigadier General, U.S. Army Air Forces
41st Bombardment Wing, Eighth Air Force
Date of Action: August 31, 1943 to September 21, 1944

Citation:

The President of the United States of America, authorized by Act of Congress July 9, 1918, took pleasure in presenting the Distinguished Service Cross to Brigadier General Robert Falligant Travis, United States Army Air Forces, for extraordinary heroism in connection with military operations against an armed enemy while serving as Commanding Officer of the 41st Bombardment Wing, Eighth Air Force, while directing bombing missions from 31 August 1943 through 21 September 1944. In operations over Germany, Denmark, France, and Czechoslovakia, with and without fighter support, General Travis distinguished himself by personally choosing to lead bombardment elements on combat missions in which it was known that heavy and extremely hazardous opposition would be met. In the face of fierce attacks by enemy airplanes which often completely overwhelmed fighter support, and very often under unusually adverse weather conditions which caused other elements to abort, this officer has exhibited great courage, coolness, and determination in carrying out operations as planned. On twenty-three missions he occupied the position of Air Commander of the 1st Bombardment Division and as such he was responsible for the efforts of hundreds of B-17 aircraft. Six times he has commanded Combat Bombardment Wing formations with great skill. During this period he has been wounded in action and the airplanes in which he has flown have repeatedly received battle damage as a result of enemy attacks. The extraordinary heroism displayed by General Travis in sustained operations has been, in large measure, responsible for the infliction of severe damage on enemy installations throughout Continental Europe. His gallant leadership, personal courage and zealous devotion to duty displayed by Brigadier General Travis on this occasion have upheld the highest traditions of the military service and reflect great credit upon himself, the 8th Air Force, and the United States Army Air Forces.

== Dates of rank ==
Insignia	Rank	Component	Date	Source
	Second Lieutenant	Field Artillery	9 June 1928	
	Second Lieutenant	Air Corps	8 September 1929	
	First Lieutenant	Air Corps	1 June 1934	
	Captain (temporary)	Air Corps	20 April 1935	
	First Lieutenant	Air Corps	17 June 1936	
	Captain	Air Corps	9 June 1938	
	Major	Army of the United States	31 January 1941	
	Major (temporary)	Air Corps	1 February 1941	
	Lieutenant Colonel (temporary)	Army of the United States	5 January 1942	
	Lieutenant Colonel	Army of the United States	1 February 1942	
	Colonel (temporary)	Army of the United States	1 March 1942	
	Brigadier General (temporary)	Army of the United States	4 May 1943	
	Major	Air Corps	9 June 1945	
	Colonel	United States Air Force	2 April 1948	
