= 29th Bombardment Squadron =

29th Bombardment Squadron may refer to:

- The 43d Flying Training Squadron, designated the 29th Bombardment Squadron (Heavy) on 22 December 1939 and active from February 1940 to March 1940 when it was redesignated the 43d Bombardment Squadron (Heavy).
- The 970th Airborne Air Control Squadron, designated the 29th Bombardment Squadron (Medium) on 22 November 1940 and active from April 1941 to May 1943 with that designation and from May 1943 to November 1946 as the 29th Bombardment Squadron (Heavy)
