= 1950 Fairfield-Suisun Boeing B-29 crash =

Aviation incident in California, United States

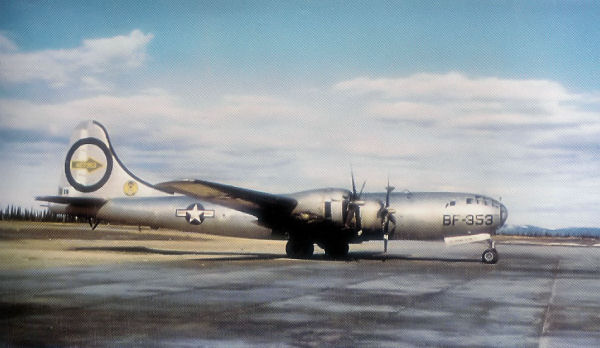
- A similar B-29 Superfortress

Accident
- Date: 5 August 1950
- Summary: Crashed during emergency landing attempt, post-crash fire and explosion
- Site: Fairfield-Suisun Air Force Base, California; 38°16′15.84″N 121°57′13.01″W
- Total fatalities: 19 (including 7 on the ground)
- Total injuries: 173 (49 severe)

Aircraft
- Aircraft type: Boeing B-29 Superfortress
- Operator: United States Air Force
- Registration: 44-87651
- Flight origin: Fairfield-Suisun AFB, California
- Destination: Guam
- Occupants: 20
- Passengers: 8
- Crew: 12
- Fatalities: 12
- Injuries: 8
- Survivors: 8

Ground casualties
- Ground fatalities: 7
- Ground injuries: 165

Northeast of San Francisco, California, on 5 August 1950, a United States Air Force Boeing B-29 Superfortress bomber carrying a Mark 4 nuclear bomb crashed shortly after takeoff from Fairfield-Suisun Air Force Base with 20 men on board. Twelve men were killed in the crash, including the commander of the 9th Bombardment Wing, Brigadier General Robert F. Travis, and another seven were killed on the ground when the aircraft exploded. The base was later renamed for Travis.

== Accident ==
In July 1950, soon after the outbreak of the Korean War, the Joint Chiefs of Staff resolved to send ten Silverplate (nuclear-capable) Boeing B-29 Superfortress bombers to Guam as a deterrent to a People's Republic of China (PRC) attack on Taiwan, (Republic of China), and for possible future use in Korea, each loaded with a Mark 4 nuclear bomb without the fissile pit. There were twenty passengers and crewmen on board B-29 44-87651 of the 99th Bombardment Squadron when it commenced takeoff from runway 21L at Fairfield-Suisun at 22:00 on Saturday, 5 August 1950, including the commander of the 9th Bombardment Wing, Brigadier General Robert F. Travis; ten men in the forward compartment and ten in the rear. The aircraft was piloted by Captain Eugene Q. Steffes, with First Lieutenant Carter W. Johnson as his co-pilot and Technical Sergeant Donald W. Moore as his flight engineer.

As the aircraft reached a speed of 125 miles per hour (201 km/h) about three-quarters of the way down the 8,000-foot (2,400 m) runway with the propellers rotating at 2,800 rpm, the number two (port inboard) propeller suddenly went up to 3,500 rpm. Steffes ordered the propeller feathered and the aircraft lifted off at an airspeed of 155 mph (249 km/h), then number three (starboard inboard) propeller suddenly went to 3,500 rpm. Moore reduced its speed to 2,800 rpm by reducing the manifold pressure. Steffes attempted to retract the landing gear by moving the gear switch to the "up" position but the gear did not respond; with the undercarriage still extended, drag reduced the aircraft's airspeed to 145 mph (233 km/h). Steffes checked the landing gear fuse; finding it satisfactory, he attempted to raise the gear again, but the gear motors did not operate.

Unable to accelerate, the aircraft would not be able to clear terrain ahead, so Steffes initiated a 180-degree turn to head back for an emergency landing. The tower cleared him to land on runway 21L, and crash crews were alerted. The aircraft turned around but lost altitude, Steffes asked Johnson to help him with the controls, and Moore reported more trouble with number three engine. Steffes allowed the aircraft to drift to the left to avoid a nearby trailer park, and the aircraft struck the ground at 120 mph (190 km/h).

The aircraft broke apart in the crash, and burst into flames, the entire nose section breaking off. The escape hatches there were jammed and would not open, but passengers and crew were able to exit through a hole in the nose caused by the crash, and through a window from which the commander and co-pilot removed the plexiglas. Travis was thrown clear from the wreckage but died from his injuries on his way to a hospital. One other man in the forward section, Staff Sergeant Joseph Prachniak, was also fatally injured. All ten people in the rear compartment died in the crash. Only one of the twenty aircraft occupants, First Lieutenant C.E. Boyce, escaped uninjured.

Four men were on duty in the base bake shop near where the forward section came to rest. They immediately ran to assist. They heard cries for help from the nose section, and helped to remove eight men from the wreckage. Firefighters arrived on the scene, as did military police and spectators. When .50 caliber ammunition started to "cook off", Sergeant Lewis Siqueira, who was in charge of the bake shop detail, ordered his men out of the area. Sergeant Paul P. Ramoneda started to do so, but then turned back to help men still trapped in the burning aircraft. Lieutenant Colonel Raymond E. Holsey, the highest-ranking officer on the scene, feared the 5,000 pounds (2,300 kg) of explosives in the Mark 4 would explode. He ordered the large crowd of rescuers and onlookers to get clear, and told the firefighters to let it burn. The firefighters and onlookers did not comply.

About 20 minutes after the crash, the high explosives in the bomb detonated, spreading wreckage and burning fuel over a 2-square-mile (5.2 km^{2}) area. The explosion blew a crater in the ground 20 yards (18 m) across and 6 feet (1.8 m) deep. An additional seven people who were not part of the crew died on the ground in the explosion, including Ramoneda and five firefighters. All of the base's fire trucks were destroyed, along with dozens of private vehicles in the nearby trailer park, which was set on fire. Some 49 people were admitted to the hospital, while another 124 were treated for minor injuries. Two women had their right feet amputated.

== Aftermath ==
The crash investigators found that the number two propeller was indeed feathered. The cause of the problem was improper adjustment during maintenance on 22 July 1950, when all four propellers were changed. A problem was detected with number two during a test flight, and the ground crew was instructed to install new contactors. There was no paperwork indicating that this was done, and the entire maintenance crew was killed in the crash. The number three engine and propeller were not found. The generators were found to be working, so there was sufficient electrical power to retract the landing gear. No crew members recalled hearing the landing gear motors. The switches could not be checked due to the degree of destruction of the aircraft, but the fuse was intact. It was noted that there were only six seat belts for the ten men in the forward compartment.

Their report made four recommendations:

1. That procedures regarding propellers be reviewed and improved so as to identify malfunctions on the ground;
2. That more emphasis be placed on training pilots and flight engineers in procedures for handling propeller problems;
3. That there should be better follow-up of maintenance problems; and
4. That escape exits and tunnels should be kept clear of baggage.

USAF B-29 operating procedures were changed as a result of the investigation; aircraft with the same type of propellers as 44-87651 were required to be test-flown after corrective maintenance, and the number of persons permitted aboard an operational flight was reduced to 16, as it was felt that overloading and an inadequate number of safety belts in the accident aircraft contributed to the high loss of life.

The 19 bodies were taken to the McCune Garden Chapel in Vacaville. The Air Force announced that the aircraft was on a "training mission". Ramoneda was posthumously awarded the Soldier's Medal, the Purple Heart and the Cheney Award. Fairfield-Suisun Air Force Base was officially renamed Travis Air Force Base in honor of the dead general on 20 October 1950. A formal renaming ceremony was held on 20 April 1951, presided over by the Governor of California, Earl Warren, which was attended by Travis's family. Only in 1994 was it revealed that an atomic bomb was involved, when an interview with Holsey was published posthumously. The Mark 4 nuclear bomb contained a depleted uranium tamper as well as radioactive material inside the electronics making up the arming and firing circuits. There was also some radium in the dials in the cockpit. A public health assessment found no detectable levels of uranium at the crash site.
