= 2nd Combat Bombardment Wing =

2nd Bombardment Wing
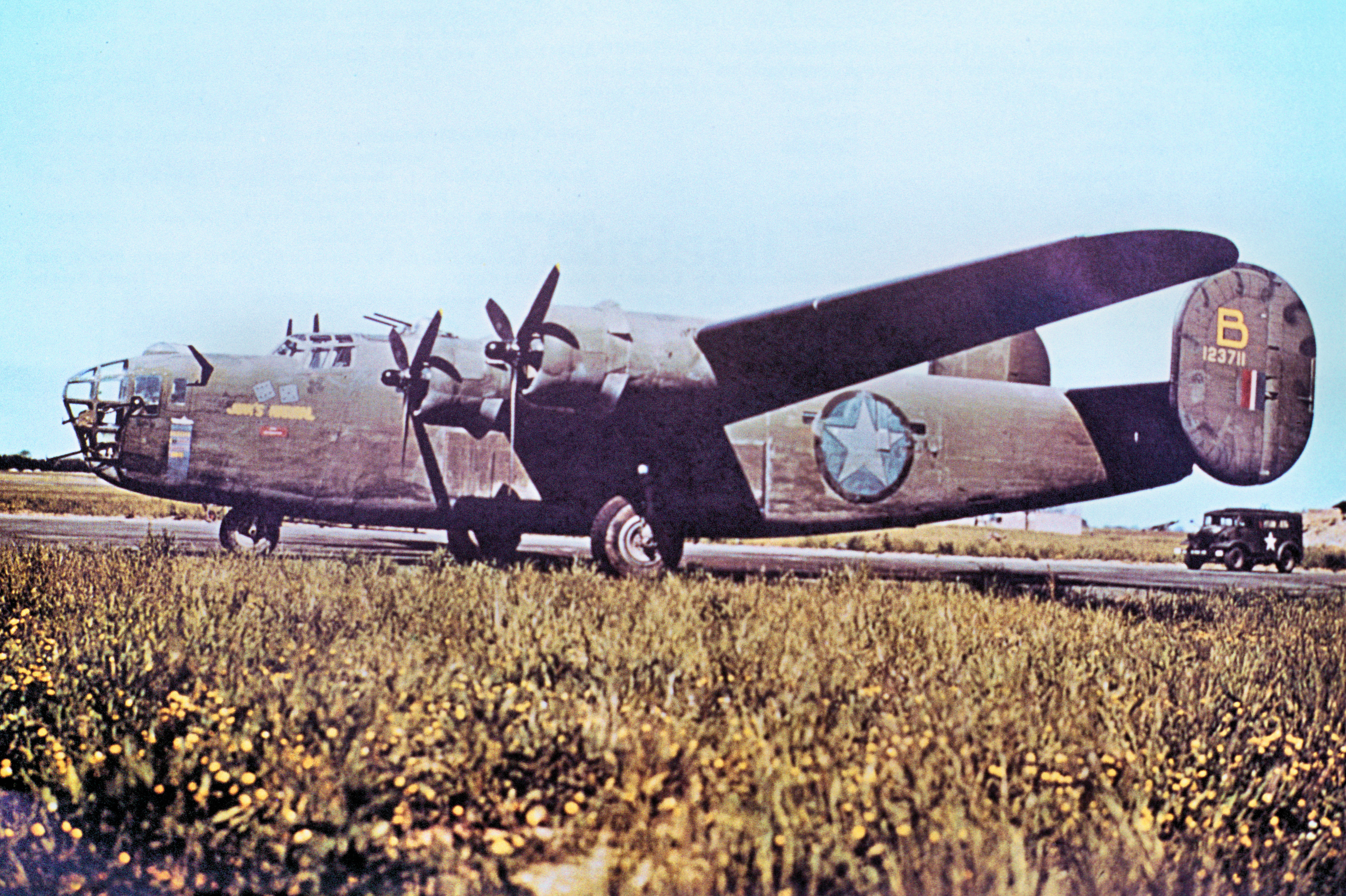
- 93rd Bombardment Group B-24D Liberator 41-23711, at RAF Alconbury, England, 1942
- Active: 1919–21, 1922–41, 1942–45
- Country: United States
- Branch: United States Army Air Forces
- Role: Bomber operational command & control
- Engagements: European Theater of World War II

Commanders
- Notable commanders: Maj Gen Oscar Westover; Lt Gen Edward Timberlake; Colonel James Stewart

Insignia
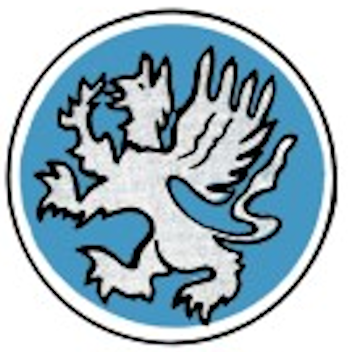
- 2nd Bombardment Wing emblem

The Second Bombardment Wing, abbreviated as 2nd Bombardment Wing of the United States Army Air Forces is a disbanded unit whose last assignment was with the Continental Air Forces, based at McChord Field, Washington. It was last active in November 1945.

== History ==
=== Pre World War II ===
The wing was organized in 1919 at Langley Field, Virginia and assumed control of all Air Service units on the Atlantic Coast. It was inactivated at Langley in 1921 and most of its personnel were assigned to Air Park No.3. It was reactivated the following year and conducted mostly bombardment operations. As the 2nd Wing, the unit became one of the original wings of the GHQ Air Force on 1 March 1935. It once again conducted much of the United States Army's pursuit, bombardment and observation operations in the eastern part of the United States. The wing's 2nd Bombardment Group was the first group of the Air Corps to equip with the Boeing B-17 Flying Fortress. The wing provided cadres for new tactical units activating as the Air Corps expanded under the Woodring Plan. It participated in maneuvers during 1940 that influenced Air Corps doctrine on the employment of airpower. The wing was inactivated in 1941 and its personnel used as the cadre for 1st Bomber Command.

=== World War II ===
The group was reactivated as a heavy bomber operational command and control organization in June 1942. It moved to England, August–September 1942, and became a heavy bombardment wing of Eighth Air Force. In the fall of 1942, it helped to train bombardment groups assigned to Twelfth Air Force. It served in combat in the European theater from November 1942 to June 1943. The wing ceased combat temporarily during July and August 1943 while its groups were detached to the Mediterranean theater. The wing resumed combat in the European theater in October 1943 and continued operations until April 1945. In August 1945 it returned to the US and was inactivated in November.

== Lineage ==
- Authorized on 15 August 1919 as the 2nd Observation Wing

Organized on 4 September 1919

- Redesignated as 2nd Wing on 14 March 1921

Inactivated on 30 September 1921.

- Activated on 8 August 1922

Redesignated 2nd Bombardment Wing on 8 May 1929
Redesignated 2nd Wing on 1 March 1935
Redesignated 2nd Bombardment Wing on 19 October 1940
Inactivated on 5 September 1941

- Activated on 7 June 1942

Redesignated 2nd Combat Bombardment Wing (Heavy) 31 August 1943
Redesignated 2nd Bombardment Wing (Heavy) June 1945
Inactivated on 7 November 1945

- Disbanded on 15 June 1983

=== Assignments ===
- Eastern Department, 4 September 1919
- Third Corps Area, 20 August 1920 - 8 August 1922
- General Headquarters, 1921 – 30 September 1921
- Third Corps Area, 8 August 1922
- General Headquarters Air Force, 1 March 1935
- Northeast Air District, 19 October 1940 – 5 September 1941
- I Bomber Command, 7 June 1942
- VIII Bomber Command, 7 September 1942
- 2nd Bombardment Division (later 2nd Air Division), 16 August 1943 – 25 August 1945
- Continental Air Forces, 6 September 1945 – 7 November 1945
- Disbanded on 15 June 1983

=== Stations ===
- Langley Field, Virginia, 4 September 1919 – 30 September 1921
- Langley Field, Virginia, 8 August 1922 – 5 September 1941
- Detrick Field, Maryland, 7 June – 15 August 1942
- Old Catton (AAF-108), England, c. 7 September 1942
- RAF Hethel (AAF-114), England, 14 September 1943
- RAF Alconbury (AAF-102), England, c. 12 June – c. 25 August 1945
- McChord Field, Washington, 6 September – 7 November 1945.

=== Components ===
Groups

- 1st Army Observation Group (later 7th Group (Observation)), 1 October 1919 – 30 August 1921
- 1st Pursuit Group, 1 March 1935 – 16 January 1941
- 2nd Bombardment Group, ca. July 1922 – 19 November 1940
- 8th Pursuit Group, 1 April 1931 – 18 December 1940
- 9th Bombardment Group, 1 March 1935 – 12 November 1940
- 15th School Group, 6 February 1923 -13 June 1924
- 22nd Bombardment Group, 1 February 1940 – 4 September 1941
- 31st Pursuit Group, 1 February 1940 – 18 December 1940
- 44th Bombardment Group, September 1942-13 September 1943 (detached to 201st Provisional Combat Bombardment Wing after 25 March 1943) (attached to IX Bomber Command 28 June 1943 – 4 October 1943)
- 93rd Bombardment Group, 6 December 1942 – 1943
- 389th Bombardment Group, 11 June 1943 – 30 May 1945 (attached to IX Bomber Command, 3 July – 3 October 1943)
- 392nd Bombardment Group, July 1943 – 1943
- 445th Bombardment Group, ca. 9 November 1943 – 9 June 1945
- 453rd Bombardment Group, 23 December 1943 – 9 May 1945

Squadrons

- Base Headquarters and 1st Air Base Squadron, 1 September 1936 – 1 September 1940
- 1st Squadron (Observation), 30 August 1921 – 30 September 1921
- Base Headquarters and 2nd Air Base Squadron, 1 September 1936 – 1 September 1940
- Base Headquarters and 3rd Air Base Squadron, 1 September 1936 – 1 September 1940
- 3rd Reconnaissance Squadron, 15 January 1941 – 5 June 1941 (attached to 13th Bombardment Group)
- 19th Airship Squadron see 19th Balloon Company below
- 36th Pursuit Squadron, 2 October 1930 – 1 April 1931 (attached to 1st Pursuit Group
- 37th Attack Squadron, 1 March 1935 – 31 January 1938 (attached to 8th Pursuit Group)
- 55th Pursuit Squadron, 15 November 1930 – 1 April 1931 (attached to 20th Pursuit Group
- 18th Reconnaissance Squadron, 1 September 1936 – ca. September 1940 (attached to 9th Bombardment Group)
- 21st Reconnaissance Squadron, 1 September 1936 – ca. September 1940 (attached to 2nd Bombardment Group to September 1939, 7th Naval District to 1940)
- 41st Reconnaissance Squadron, 1 March 1935 – 1 September 1936 (attached to Air Corps Advanced Flying School), (attached 1 February 1940 – ca. December 1940)
- 50th Squadron (Observation) (later 50th Observation Squadron), 5 August 1922 – Jun 1927 (attached to Air Service Field Officer School (later Air Service Tactical School, Air Corps Tactical School)
- 88th Reconnaissance Squadron, September 1919 – 24 March 1920 (attached to 1st Army Observation Group after October 1919)

Company

- 19th Balloon Company (later 19th Dirigible Company, 19th Airship Company 19th Airship Squadron), 4 September 1919 – 30 September 1921 (attached to 1st Provisional Air Brigade after 6 May 1921), 8 August 1922 – 8 May 1929 (attached 8 May 1929 – 3 November 1935)

Except as noted, lineage and station information is in Maurer, Combat Units.

=== Awards ===
- European Theater of World War II
- Campaigns:

Air Offensive, Europe
Naples-Foggia
Normandy
Northern France

Rhineland
Ardennes-Alsace
Central Europe
