= 28th Flying Training Wing =

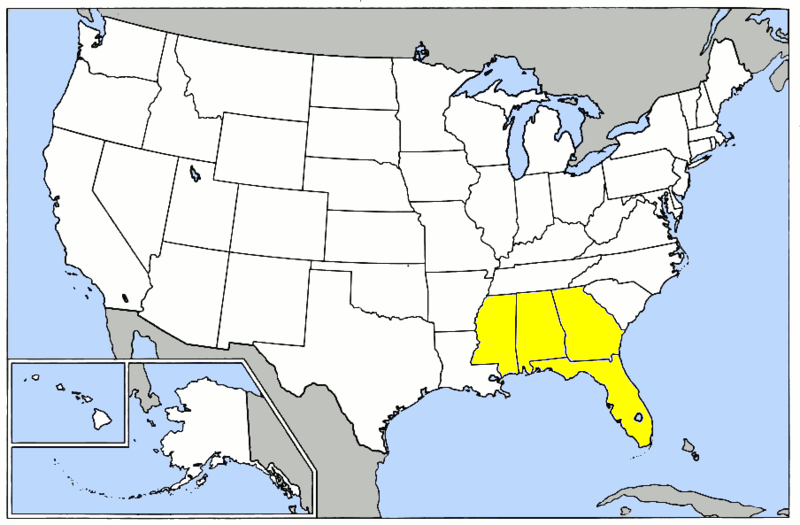
- Locations of airfields controlled by the 28th Flying Training Wing
- Active: 1942–1945
- Country: United States
- Branch: United States Army Air Forces
- Role: Training
- Part of: Eastern Flying Training Command
- Engagements: World War II: World War II American Theater

The 28th Flying Training Wing was a unit of the United States Army Air Forces. It was last assigned to the Eastern Flying Training Command, and was disbanded on 30 December 1945 at Craig Field, Alabama.

There is no lineage between the United States Air Force 28th Bomb Wing, established on 28 July 1947 at Rapid City Army Air Base, South Dakota, and this organization.

== History ==
The wing commanded Eastern Flying Training Command Flight Schools in the Southeastern United States. Graduates of the advanced schools were commissioned as Second Lieutenants, receiving their "wings". Most of the assigned schools provided phase III advanced single-engine flying training for Air Cadets, from which the graduates would attend Replacement Training schools operated by one of the numbered air forces in single-engine fighters. From there they would be deployed overseas to the combat theaters as replacement pilots.

The command also operated several specialized schools at Jackson, Tuskegee, Spence and Clewiston. Jackson Army Air Base was the home of the Royal Netherlands Flight Academy, which trained pilots for their air force. It also had a two-engine school for B-25 Mitchell medium bomber training for Dutch pilots. Riddle Field at Clewiston, Florida was a contract pilot school which taught both primary and basic flight training. Tuskegee Field, Alabama was exclusively for black air cadets, who received their basic and single-engine advanced training by black Army instructors after graduating from the primary school at Moton Field, operated by the Tuskegee Institute.

As training requirements changed during the war, schools were activated and inactivated or transferred to meet those requirements.

=== Lineage ===
- Established as 28th Flying Training Wing on 17 December 1942

Activated on 26 December 1942
Disbanded on 30 December 1945

=== Assignments ===
- Army Air Forces Southeast Training Center, 26 December 1942
- Army Air Forces Eastern Flying Training Command, 15 Sep 1943 – 30 Dec 1945

=== Training aircraft ===
The advanced trainer operated by the schools was the North American AT-6 Texan. The contract primary school at Clewiston flew Boeing-Stearman PT-17s. The basic schools at Jackson, Tuskegee and Spence Fields flew Vultee BT-13 Valiant single-engine trainers.

=== Assigned pilot schools ===
Craig Field, Selma, Alabama
AAF Pilot School (Advanced Single Engine)
21st Single-Engine Flying Training Group
Opened: April 1941, Closed: December 1945 (AT-6)
Aircraft carried fuselage code "CR" Also trained Free French Air Force cadets; Advanced school closed at the end of World War II; remained open after World War II as Craig Air Force Base, closed 1977

Jackson Army Airbase, Jackson, Mississippi
AAF Specialized Flying School (Basic-Advanced)
35th Base Headquarters and Air Base Squadron
Opened: January 1941, Closed: December 1945 (BT-13, AT-6)
Also Royal Netherlands Flying School (B-25)

Marianna Army Airfield, Marianna, Florida
AAF Pilot School (Advanced Single Engine), two-engine transition school
17th Single-Engine Flying Training Group
Opened: January 1942, Closed: September 1944 (AT-6)
Aircraft carried fuselage code "MA" Became A-26 Invader transition school, September 1944 closed October 1945; re-opened as Graham Air Base, 1953, closed 1961

Napier Army Airfield, Dothan, Alabama
AAF Pilot School (Advanced Single Engine)
18th Single-Engine Flying Training Group
Opened: December 1941, Closed: October 1945 (AT-6)
Aircraft carried fuselage code "N" Trained RAF and Mexican Air Force cadets

Riddle Field, Clewiston, Florida
AAF Contract Pilot School (Primary-Advanced)
75th Flying Training Detachment (Contract Pilot)
Opened: April 1943, Closed: September 1945 (PT-17, AT-6)
Operated by: Riddle-McKay Aero School

Spence Army Airfield, Moultrie, Georgia
AAF Pilot School (Advanced Single Engine)
7th Single-Engine Flying Training Group
Opened: April 1943, Closed: November 1945 (BT-13, AT-6)
In 1945 Basic training was transferred from Cochran (BT-13) to Spence (AT-6); Re-opened as Spence Air Base, 1951–1961

Tuskegee Army Airfield, Tuskegee, Alabama
AAF Pilot School (Basic-Advanced)
Opened: May 1941, Closed: September 1946 (BT-13, AT-6)
Tuskegee had Basic and Advanced Flying Schools for African American flight cadets. Primary flight training was conducted at nearby Moton Field flying PT-17 Stearmans. Graduates then moved on to the Basic Flying School and then the Advanced Single-Engine School at Tuskegee flying AT-6 Texans.

=== Stations ===
- George Army Airfield, Illinois, 26 December 1942
- Craig Field, Alabama, 15 August 1943 – 30 December 1945.
