= I Bomber Command =

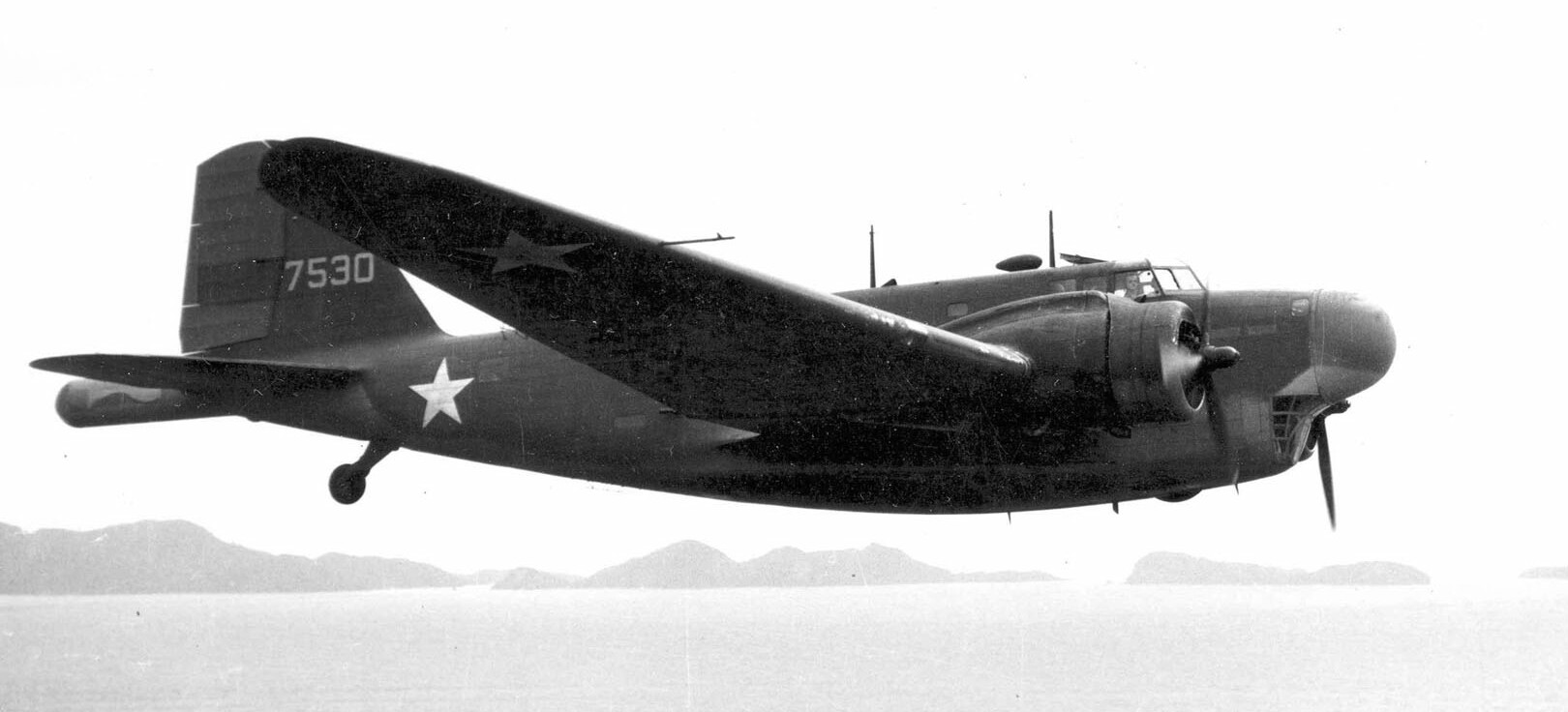
- B-18 Bolo modified for antisubmarine warfare (Note: Aircraft is Douglas B-18B Bolo, serial 37-530. It was originally buit as a B-18A.)
- Active: 1942–1943; 1943
- Country: United States
- Branch: United States Air Force
- Role: Antisubmarine Warfare and Bombardment Training
- Part of: Second Air Force
- Engagements: Antisubmarine (American Theater)

Commanders
- Notable commanders: Robert F. Travis

Insignia
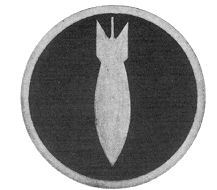
- I Bomber Command emblem (Note: Approved 24 April 1942.)

The I Bomber Command (later XX Bomber Command) was an intermediate command of the Army Air Forces during World War II. It trained bombardment units and aircrews for deployment to combat theaters. From shortly after the attack on Pearl Harbor until its assets were transferred to Army Air Forces Antisubmarine Command in October 1942, it conducted antisubmarine warfare off the Atlantic and Gulf coasts of the United States.

The command was activated again for a brief period in 1943, again as a bomber training command, located in the southwestern United States. It was disbanded in October 1943.

== History ==
=== Initial activation and involvement in antisubmarine warfare ===
GHQ Air Force (GHQ, AF) had been established with two major combat functions, to maintain a striking force against long range targets, and the air defense of the United States. In the spring of 1941, GHQ, AF reorganized its Northeast Air District as 1st Air Force. To carry out its mission of training and maintaining a strike force, 1st Air Force organized 1st Bomber Command at Langley Field, Virginia in September 1941, shortly before the attack on Pearl Harbor. The command was originally established to control and train bombardment organizations assigned to 1st Air Force. (Note: Both organizations were established with arabic numerals in their names. In September 1942, the Army established that Numbered Air Forces would be identified with spelled out numbers and commands with roman numerals. "Air Force Historical Research Agency Organizational Reconds: Types of USAF Organizations". Air Force History Index. 9 January 2008..) It drew its cadre from the 2d Bombardment Wing, which was inactivated the same day, and whose subordinate units were reassigned to the command. Shortly after the attack, The best trained units in the command moved to critical defense areas or were identified for early shipment overseas.

In November 1941, an increase in German U-boat activity brought a Navy request for reinforcement of Army bomber forces in Newfoundland. In the first week of December, the command dispatched the 49th Bombardment Squadron to meet the Navy request. Then the command's headquarters moved to New York City, New York.

Within a month after the declaration of war by the United States against Germany, German Navy submarines began operating in American coastal waters. By March 1942 fifty-three ships had been sunk in the North Atlantic Naval Coastal Frontier. Defense plans drawn up before the war began assigned the Navy responsibility for operations beyond the coastline, with Army aircraft serving in a supporting role. Because naval aviation that could perform long range patrols was nearly non-existent along the Atlantic coast in early 1942, the burden for aerial antisubmarine patrols fell on the Army Air Forces (AAF), which had available long range and very long range aircraft, (Note: At the time, 600 miles was considered "long range" and 1000 miles was "very long range." Warnock, p. 2.) but whose crews had not been trained for the mission. Moreover, the AAF's long range planes were armed with bombs, rather than depth charges.

As a result, the Commander of the North Atlantic Naval Coastal Frontier requested the Army's Eastern Defense Command to undertake offshore patrols with all available aircraft. The first patrols were performed by elements of I Bomber Command, which would be the primary AAF command involved in antisubmarine warfare (ASW) in early 1942, with assistance from I Air Support Command. However, although I Bomber Command was primarily involved in conducting ASW, it was doing so on an emergency basis, and was subject to withdrawal from these duties to perform its primary bombardment function. The command used Douglas B-18 Bolo and North American B-25 Mitchells to patrol as far out as 300 miles, and Boeing B-17 Flying Fortresses to patrol to 600 miles from shore, but in early operations was only able to maintain six aircraft on patrol. For patrols closer to the shore, the command relied on the civilian pilots of the new Civil Air Patrol.

In March 1942, the command received its first planes equipped with radar. It soon became apparent that if the AAF were to continue with the ASW mission, its units would have to be organized under a specially trained and equipped command. The personnel and assets of I Bomber Command were transferred to the newly created Army Air Forces Antisubmarine Command on 15 October 1942.

=== Return to bomber training ===
The command was reactivated as a bomber training command at El Paso, Texas in May 1943 and assigned to Second Air Force, which was training all heavy bomber units and aircrews for the AAF. It was renamed the XX Bomber Command in August 1943, avoiding duplication with another I Bomber Command, which would be located at Mitchel Field, New York later in August. The command was disbanded in October 1943.

== Lineage ==
- Constituted as the 1st Bomber Command on 4 September 1941
  Activated on 5 September 1941
- Redesignated I Bomber Command on 18 September 1942
  Inactivated on 15 October 1942
- Activated on 1 May 1943
  Redesignated XX Bomber Command c. 15 August 1943
  Disbanded on 6 October 1943 (Note: When the United States Air Force became a separate service in September 1947, former Air Corps units were transferred to it, including units like the command, that had been disbanded.)

=== Assignments ===
- First Air Force, 5 September 1941 – 15 October 1942
- Second Air Force, 1 May – 6 October 1943

=== Components ===
Groups

- 1st Pursuit Group, 5 September – 9 December 1941
- 2d Bombardment Group, 5 September 1941 – 15 October 1942 (Note: Haulman says transfer occurred on 13 October 1942, but AAF Antisubmarine Command was not activated until 15 October.)
- 13th Bombardment Group: 5 September 1941 – 15 October 1942
- 22d Bombardment Group, 5 September 1941 – February 1942
- 34th Bombardment Group, 5 September 1941 – 27 January 1942
- 43d Bombardment Group, c. 5 September 1941 – c. 28 March 1942
- 45th Bombardment Group: 5 January – 15 October 1942
- 46th Bombardment Group, 15 May – 6 October 1943

Squadron

- 124th Observation Squadron: attached 3 July – 15 October 1942

=== Stations ===
- Langley Field, Virginia, 5 September 1941
- New York City, New York, 12 December 1941 – 15 October 1942
- El Paso, Texas, 1 May – 16 October 1943

=== Campaign ===
Campaign Streamer	Campaign	Dates	Notes
	Antisubmarine	7 December 1941–15 October 1942	I Bomber Command
