= 15th Bombardment Operational Training Wing =

15th Bombardment Training Wing
- Active: 1940–1946
- Country: United States
- Branch: United States Air Force
- Role: Bombardment training

Commanders
- Notable commanders: Robert F. Travis

The 15th Bombardment Training Wing is a disbanded United States Air Force unit. Its last assignment was with Second Air Force, at Colorado Springs Army Air Base, Colorado, where it was inactivated on 9 April 1946.

== History ==
The wing was activated at March Field, California in December 1940 and assigned to the Southwest Air District. Its operational components were the 47th and 48th Bombardment Groups In September 1941, the wing was inactivated and its personnel used to form the 4th Air Support Command.

It trained groups and heavy bombardment replacement crews for Second Air Force June 1942 until February 1945 when it ceased all activity.

=== Lineage ===
- Constituted as the 15th Bombardment Wing on 19 October 1940

Activated on 18 December 1940
Inactivated on 3 September 1941

- Activated on 23 June 1942

Redesignated 15th Bombardment Training Wing in January 1943
Redesignated 15th Bombardment Operational Training Wing in April 1943
Inactivated on 9 April 1946
Disbanded on 8 October 1948

=== Assignments ===
- Southwest Air District, 18 December 1940 – 3 September 1941
- Second Air Force, 23 June 1942 – 6 April 1946

=== Components ===
- 47th Bombardment Group: 14 August-1 September 1941
- 48th Bombardment Group: 15 January-1 September 1941
- Numerous groups assigned for training, 1942–1946

=== Stations ===
- March Field, California, 18 December 1940
- Fresno Army Air Base, California, c. 2 August – 3 September 1941
- Gowen Field, Idaho, 23 June 1942
- Sioux City Army Air Base, Iowa, November 1942
- Gowen Field, Idaho, July 1943
- Pueblo Army Air Base, Colorado, May 1944
- Peterson Field, Colorado, 8 September 1944 – 9 April 1946
