= 2nd Operations Group =

US Air Force unit

2d Operations Group
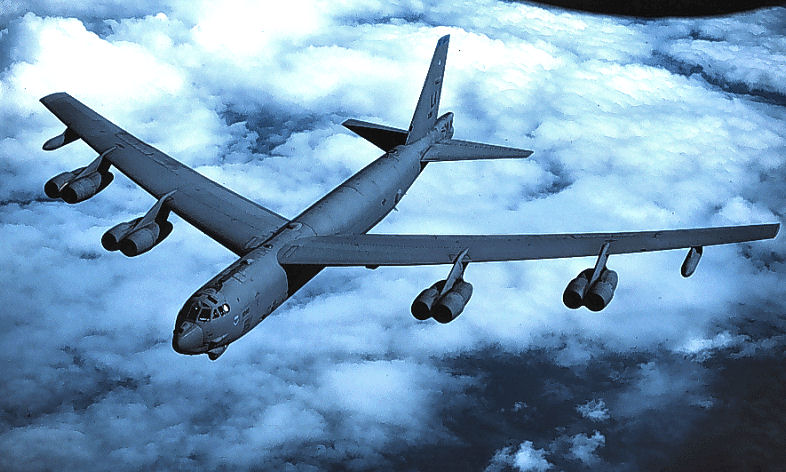
- B-52H Stratofortress of the 20th Bomb Squadron
- Active: 10 September 1918 – present
- Country: United States
- Branch: United States Air Force
- Type: Group
- Role: Bombardment
- Part of: Air Force Global Strike Command
- Garrison/HQ: Barksdale Air Force Base, Louisiana
- Motto: Libertatem Defendimus Latin Liberty We Defend
- Tail Code: "LA"
- Engagements: World War I: St. Mihiel Offensive Campaign; Meuse-Argonne Offensive Campaign; World War II American Theater: Antisubmarine Campaign; EAME Theater: Tunisia Campaign; Sicily Campaign; Naples-Foggia Campaign; Anzio Campaign; Rome-Arno Campaign; Normandy Campaign; Northern France Campaign; Southern France Campaign; North Apennines Campaign; Rhineland Campaign; Central Europe Campaign; Po Valley Campaign; War on Terror Expeditionary: Operation Enduring Freedom; Operation Iraqi Freedom

- Decorations: Distinguished Unit Citation: Steyr, Austria, 24 Feb 1944; Germany, 25 Feb 1944; Air Force Outstanding Unit Award (5x)

Commanders
- Current commander: Colonel Bryan J. Walter
- Notable commanders: Lewis H. Brereton; Robert Olds; Harold L. George; John D. Ryan; James M. Kowalski; Darr H. Alkire

Insignia
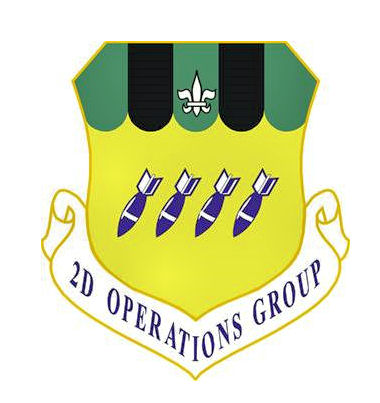
- 2d Operations Group emblem

Aircraft flown
- Bomber: B-52H Stratofortress

The 2d Operations Group (2 OG) is the flying component of the United States Air Force 2d Bomb Wing, assigned to the Air Force Global Strike Command Eighth Air Force. The group is stationed at Barksdale Air Force Base, Louisiana.

2 OG is one of two Air Force Global Strike Command groups to fly the B-52H Stratofortess. Its mission is to protect the United States and further its global interests by providing devastating combat capability.

The group is a successor organization to 2d Bombardment Group, one of the 15 original combat air groups formed by the Army before World War II. It is the oldest bomb group of the Air Force, having fought on the Western Front during World War I, entering combat on 12 September 1918. After the war, it participated in Brigadier General Billy Mitchell's 1921-1923 off-shore bombing tests. During World War II the group engaged in combat from bases in North Africa and Italy flying B-17 Flying Fortress.

In the postwar era, the 2d Bombardment Group was one of the first USAAF units assigned to the Strategic Air Command on 1 July 1947, prior to the establishment of the United States Air Force. Equipped with low-hour B-29 Superfortress surplus World War II aircraft, the group was inactivated in 1952 when the parent wing adopted the Tri-Deputate organization and assigned all of the group's squadrons directly to the wing.

Reactivated as the 2d Operations Group in 1991 when the 2d Bomb Wing adopted the USAF Objective organization plan.

== Components ==
The 2 OG (Tail Code: LA) consists of the following squadrons:

- 2d Operations Support Squadron
- 11th Bomb Squadron Gold tail stripe
- 20th Bomb Squadron Blue tail stripe
- 96th Bomb Squadron Red tail stripe

== History ==
See 2d Bomb Wing for additional history and lineage information

=== World War I ===
Organized as the 1st Day Bombardment Group as part of the Air Service, United States First Army on 10 September 1918 at Amanty Airdrome, France. The group consisted of the 96th Aero Squadron, which had been operating independently and was equipped with French Breguet 14 B.2 bombers. Three other squadrons, the 11th, 20th and 166th Aero Squadrons were equipped with American-built de Havilland DH-4s.

The group completed its organization and began operations on 12 September, however only the 96th, 11th and 20th had received its aircraft at the opening of the St. Mihiel Offensive. Due to its experience, the 96th Squadron was the most effective in combat operations, however the other three squadrons also achieved a high degree of efficiency, gaining experience attacking troop concentrations and communications to interfere with the enemy's movement of reinforcements and supplies to the front. Other patrols of the group were flown by conducting bombing operations that helped to protect Allied ground forces by diverting German pursuit planes from the battle zone.

The initial attack by the group on 13 September sent five aircraft of the 96th Squadron to Chambley, but only three managed to cross into enemy territory. They were attacked by fifteen Enemy Aircraft and they approached their objective, which shot down two group aircraft. The objective was successfully bombed, however, and two enemy aircraft were shot down. The first full group action took place the next day with three missions being performed. The railway yards at Conflans-en-Jarnisy, Vittonville and Arnaville were all attacked, along with secondary attacks at Étain and Dommary-Baroncourt. Nine enemy aircraft were encountered in combat, shooting down one near Mars la Tour. The 11th lost a plane near Chambley.

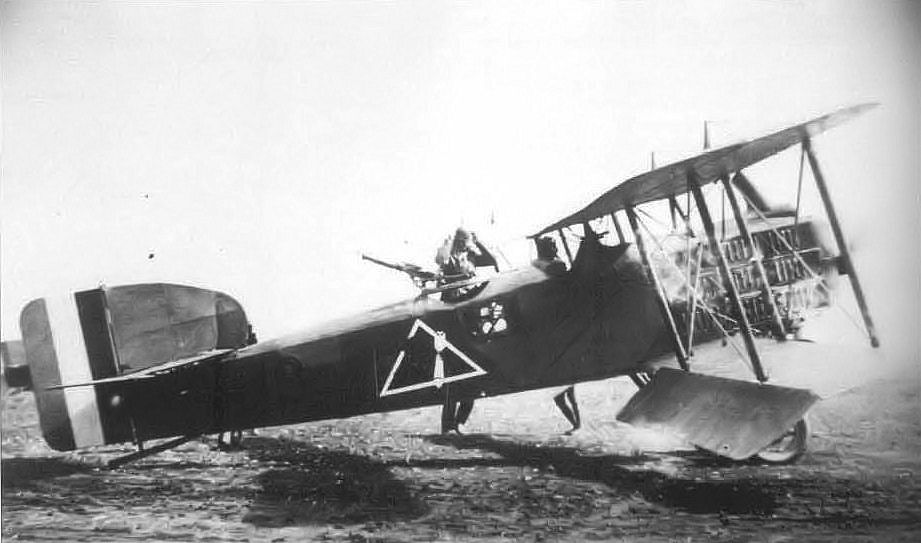
Breguet 14 B.2 bomber of the 96th Aero Squadron

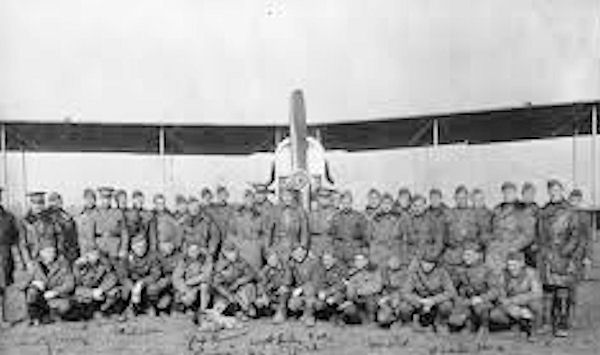
Members of the 166th Aero Squadron in front of a De Havilland DH-4

During the offensive large concentrations of enemy aircraft were encountered, giving formidable resistance and great losses due to attempting penetrations of enemy air space with small formations and without protection from pursuit aircraft. On 23 September, operation were moved to Maulan Aerodrome, and on 26 September, Dun-sur-Meuse was attacked by both Bregut and DH-4 Squadrons in the morning, and Etain by the DH-4s in the afternoon.

On 9 October 1918, it participated in one of the largest bombing raids of the war, when 353 Allied planes commanded by Gen. Billy Mitchell struck German troop concentrations in the Meuse-Argonne area where German troops were preparing for a counterattack against the Allied offensive.

The final bombardment mission of the group took place on 5 November when three formations of DH-4s were dispatched to raid Mousson and Roucourt, Belgium in the morning. Planes from the 11th Squadron failed to cross the lines, however the others reached their assigned objective and at Mouzon, where the weather permitted observation, accurate bomb hits and many fires, with a large number of explosions were noted. Enemy aircraft resistance was strong, with the 20th being attacked by three formations of Fokkers, some with four machine guns, rather than the normal two mounted in front. The 20th managed to shoot down four of the enemy, however, lost three aircraft of their own in the combat. During the remaining days of the war, the 1st Day Bombardment Group was on alert, however bad weather prevented any combat operations from taking place.

In more than two months of combat, the group delivered more than 111 tons of bombs on German targets. Demobilized in France on 17 January 1919.

=== Interwar years ===
The group was re-organized at Ellington Field, Texas in August 1919, and reactivated there on 18 September 1919 as part of the Air Service. It was composed of the same four squadrons that made up the group during World War I and was equipped with DH-4s. On 25 September it moved to Kelly Field. On 31 March 1921, the 1st Day Bombardment Group was re-designated the 2d Group (Bombardment), and on 25 January 1923, as the 2d Bombardment Group.

From 13 to 21 July 1921, the 2d Group's four bombardment squadrons were detached to General Mitchell's 1st Provisional Air Brigade to conduct controversial tests to determine the efficiency of aircraft against naval warships. The aircraft successfully bombed and sank three ex-German warships, including the formidable 22,437-ton battleship Ostfriesland, off Cape Henry, Virginia. From 23 to 26 September 1921, the group's bombardment squadrons, again under the direction of General Mitchell, bombed and sank the ex-Navy battleship USS Alabama (BB-8) in yet another test of aircraft bombardment efficiency.

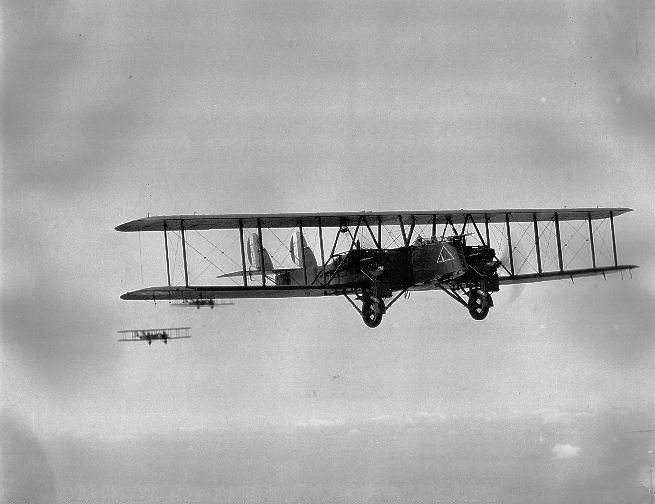
NBS-1 of the 96th Bomb Squadron, April 1926

On 1 July 1922, the 2d group relocated to Langley Field, Virginia, where it would remain for the next twenty years. On 5 September 1923, the group, operating from an improvised aerodrome on the sands near Cape Hatteras, N.C., bombed and sank the ex-Navy battleships USS Virginia (BB-13) and USS New Jersey (BB-16).

To further attest the group's capabilities, three 97th Bombardment Squadron Martin B-10B aircraft commanded by Capt. Richard E. Nugent departed Langley Field, Va., and successfully bombed a target 600 miles away in Michigan during the Second Army Maneuvers. This mission, flown almost entirely in inclement weather, garnered the squadron the 1936 Mackay Trophy.

Following a devastating crash of the prototype Model 299 in 1935, the group received, on 4 March 1937, the first of 12 B-17 Flying Fortresses delivered to the U.S. Army Air Corps. In response to concerns for the safety of flying the new machine, the pilots of 2d group (including Robert Olds, Robert Travis, Gerald Williams, and Curtis LeMay) developed what would become the modern preflight checklists. In February 1938, a goodwill tour to Argentina by six B-17s, (pilots including Olds, Williams, and LeMay), and a flight to Colombia by three B-17s in August of the same year highlighted the late 1930s. The trip to Buenos Aires represented the longest distance performance of its kind on record and won the group the Mackay Trophy in 1938. A second MacKay trophy was won in February of the following year when a crew flew medical supplies aboard the XB-15 to Chile following a catastrophic earthquake.

The group also achieved a well-publicized success on 12 May 1938, when three B-17s, led by group commander Lt. Col. Robert Olds and navigated by 1st Lt. Curtis E. LeMay, intercepted the Italian ocean liner Rex over 600 miles at sea during a training exercise.

On 6 December 1939, the group was redesignated the 2d Bombardment Group (Heavy).

=== World War II ===
Served on antisubmarine duty for several months after the U.S. entered World War II. In October 1942 was re-designated as 2d Bombardment Group (Heavy) and earmarked for combat. The group was transferred on paper to Geiger Field, Washington, where it was re-organized and trained with new personnel.

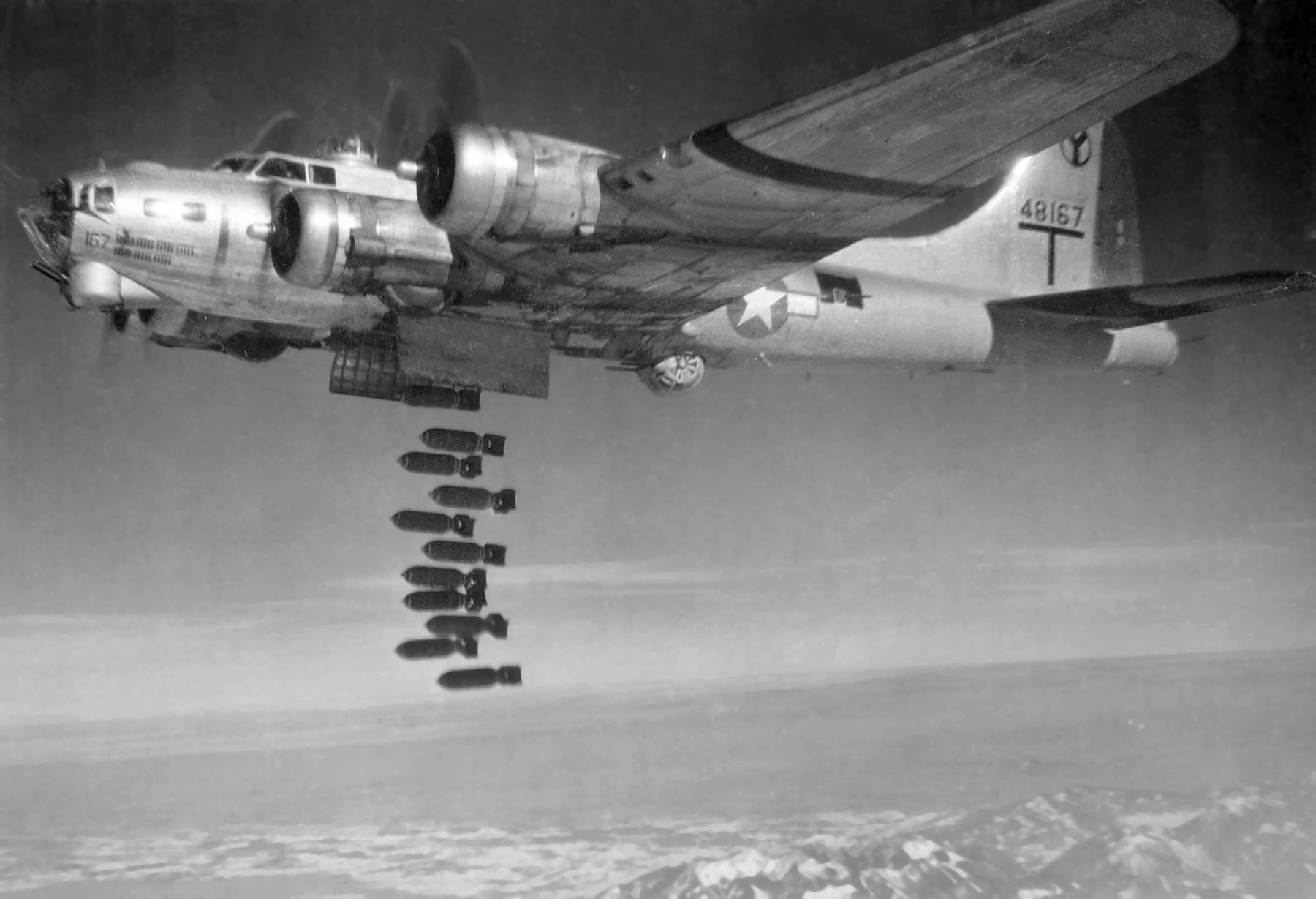
A B-17G of the 96th BS, 2d BG, dropping its bombs.

The group was made up of four Squadrons, the 20th, 49th, 96th, and the 429th. In November 1942, the squadrons were sent to satellite bases in Montana for additional training as units, the 20th to Great Falls, the 49th to Lewistown, the 96th to Glasgow, and the 429th to Cut Bank. This was the third and final phase of training.

The 2d Bombardment Group and squadrons left their satellite bases on 13–14 March 1943 arriving at Camp Kilmer, New Jersey 17–18 March 1943 for debarkation overseas. The Flight Echelon left the above bases for Morrison Field West Palm Beach, Florida; Natal, Brazil; Marrakech, Morocco and arriving at Navarin, Algeria on 22 April 1943. The Ground Echelon were disbursed at Camp Kilmer in several ships arriving at Casablanca and Port Lyautey in March/April 1943, thence motor and train convoy to Navarin, Algeria. Was initially assigned to Twelfth Air Force.

It arrived at Chateau D'un, Algeria on 27 April 1943. The first mission on 28 April 1943 was to Terranova, Sardinia. The 2d Bombardment Group departed Chateau D'un after flying 25 missions and arrived at Ain M'Lila, Algeria on 17 June 1943 and flew 25 missions from that base. The group departed for Massicault, Tunisia on 31 July 1943 and flew 56 missions from that base.

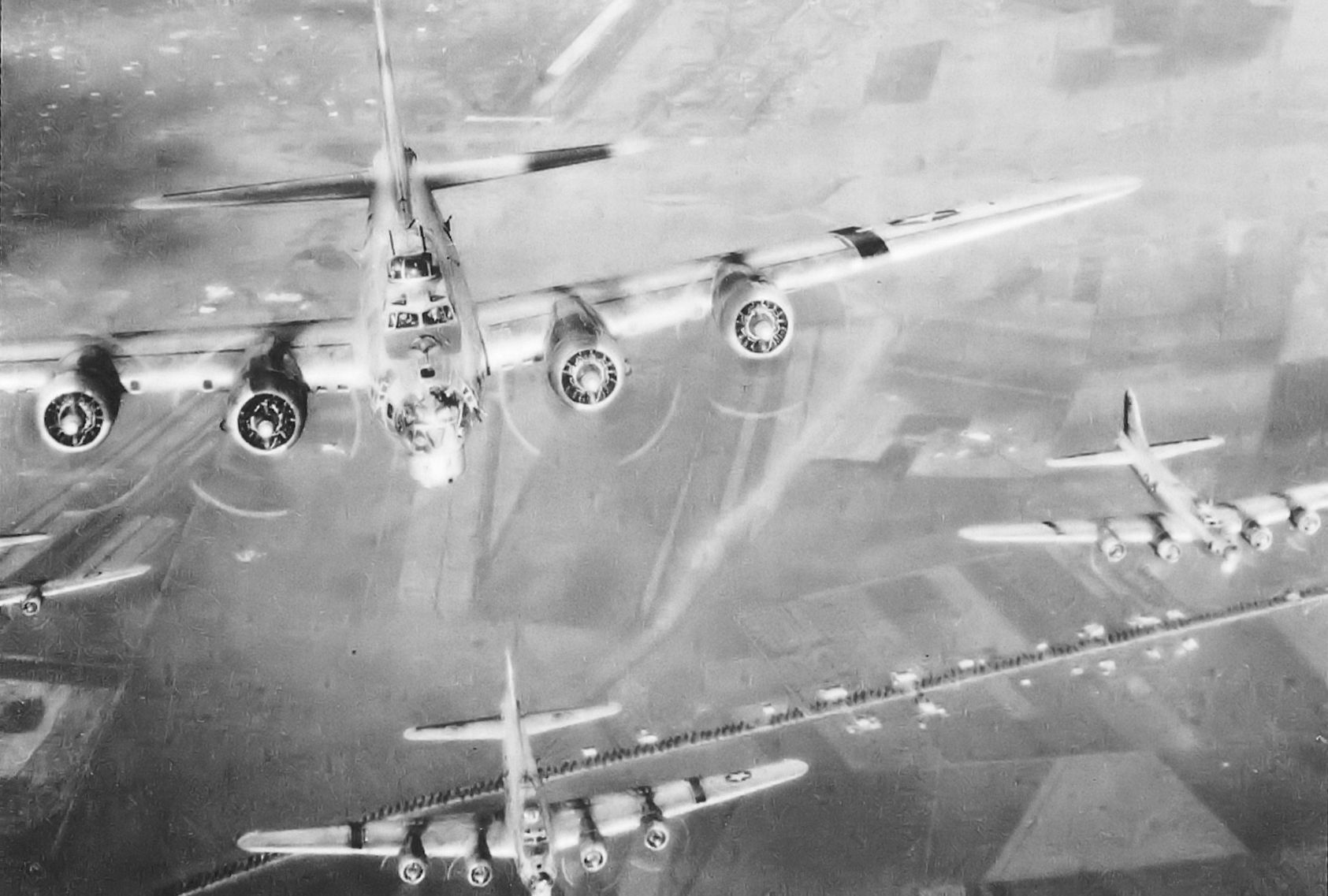
2d Bombardment Group B-17s form up and begin their climb to altitude from Amendola Airfield, Italy, 1944

Missions flown included bombing such targets as marshalling yards, airdromes, troop concentrations, bridges, docks, and shipping. Participated in the defeat of Axis forces in Tunisia, April–May 1943; the reduction of Pantelleria and the preparations for the invasion of Sicily, May–July 1943; and the invasion of Italy, September 1943.

Moved to Italy in December 1943 and continued operations as part of Fifteenth Air Force. Operated primarily from Amendola Air Base in Foggia. Engaged primarily in long-range bombardment of strategic targets in Germany, Poland, Czechoslovakia, Austria, Hungary, Yugoslavia, Rumania, and Greece. Participated in the drive toward Rome, January–June 1944; the invasion of Southern France, August 1944, and the campaigns against German forces in northern Italy, June 1944 – May 1945. En route to bomb an aircraft factory at Steyr, Austria on 24 February 1944, the group was greatly outnumbered by enemy interceptors, but it maintained its formation and bombed the target, receiving a Distinguished Unit Citation (DUC) for the performance. On the following day, while on a mission to attack aircraft factories at Regensburg, it met similar opposition equally well and was awarded a second DUC.

Served as part of the occupation force in Italy after V-E Day. Inactivated in Italy on 28 February 1946. Group gunners claimed 279 victories of German and Italian aircraft. Flew 406 combat missions; 146 aircraft lost.

=== Cold War ===
On 1 July 1947, the group was redesignated the 2d Bombardment Group (Very Heavy) and activated at Davis Monthan Field, Arizona. Equipped with B-29 Superfortress bombers, the 2d BG became part of the Strategic Air Command. Trained for bombardment missions and deployed to England, August–November 1948 and February–May 1950. On 10 February 1951 the group became a "paper organization" with its squadron components attached directly to the 2 Bombardment Wing as part of the Air Force tri-deputate reorganization. Inactivated on 16 June 1952.

=== 1990s ===
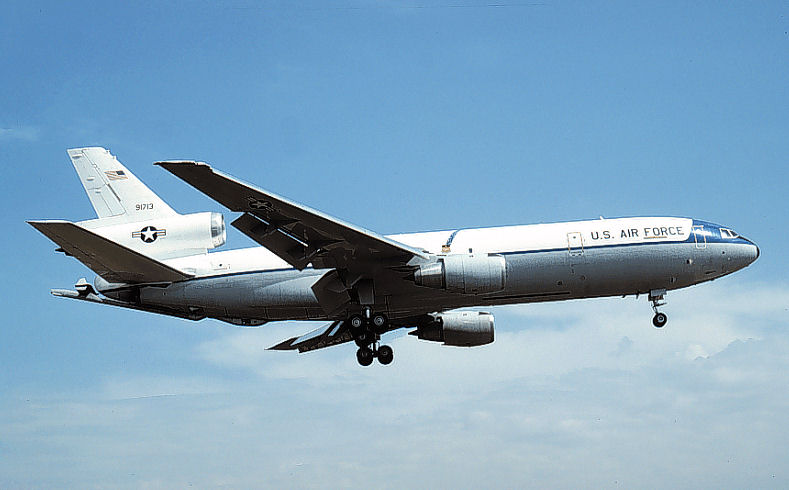
McDonnell Douglas KC-10A Extender 79-1713

The group was reactivated in on 1 September 1991 as the 2d Operations Group and assigned to the 2d Wing as part of the "Objective Wing" concept adapted by the Air Force. 2 OG took control of the wings bomber and refueling squadrons upon activation.

Trained for global conventional bombardment missions as well as maintaining nuclear operational readiness. Briefly controlled the wing's air refueling mission until it transferred to Air Mobility Command. Provided combat crew training for all USAF B-52 aircrews, beginning November 1994. In response to Saddam Hussein's attacks against the Kurdish minority in northern Iraq, aircrews of the 96th Bomb Sq deployed and launched attacks against military targets in Iraq in September 1996, actions for which the aircrews received the Mackay trophy as the most meritorious flight of 1996. Continued to deploy aircraft and personnel to southwest Asia to support the Allied watch on the southern and northern "no-fly" zones in Iraq. Flew combat missions against targets in Iraq, 17–18 December 1998, in response to Iraq's refusal to allow UN weapons inspectors to continue work. Flew combat missions against targets in Yugoslavia, 24 March – 9 June 1999, in support of NATO Operation Allied Force. In October 1999 began deploying personnel in support of aerospace expeditionary forces worldwide and maintaining on-call elements at home. Colonel James Kowalski was the Commander of the 2nd Operations Group when they deployed B-52s for combat during operations Noble Anvil and Allied Force from May 1999 - December 2000.

=== Afghanistand and Iraq ===
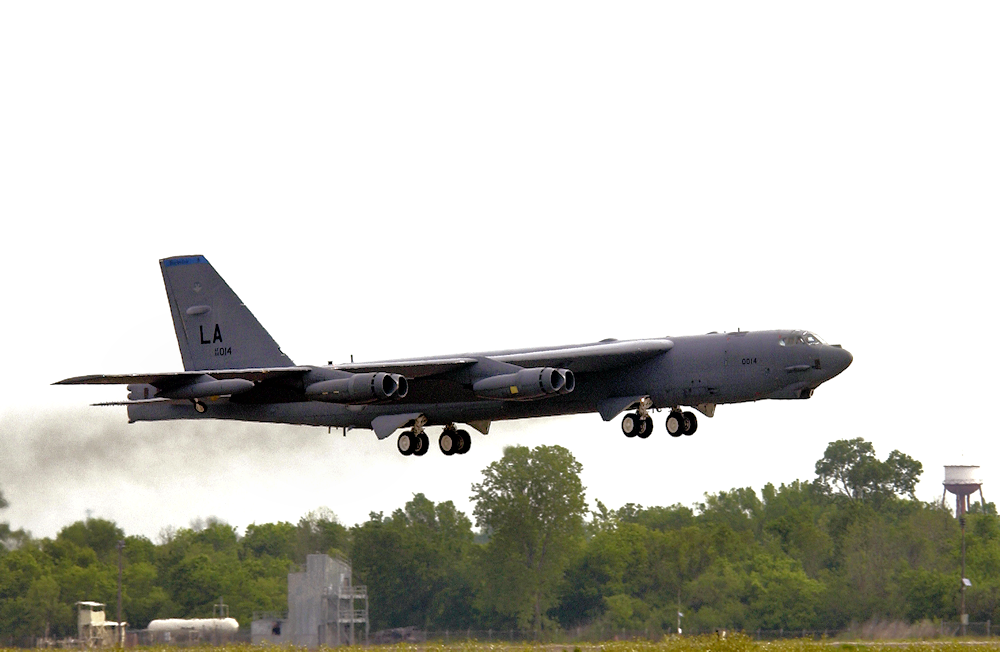
Boeing B-52H-140-BW Stratofortress 60-014 taking off for the aircraft's 50th Anniversary

After the terrorist attacks against the U.S. on 11 September 2001, group elements, including the 20 Bomb Sq, deployed to the island of Diego Garcia in the Indian Ocean. On 7 October flew early attacks on targets in Afghanistan in Operation Enduring Freedom, probably on air defence sites as part of Operation Crescent Wind. Later flew airborne alert missions over Afghanistan and in Operation Anaconda, flew bombing missions against targets in eastern Afghanistan, 1–18 March 2002.

In the invasion of Iraq beginning March 2003, flew missions on 21 March in "shock and awe" strikes against command and control targets. Provided bomber combat power and expeditionary combat support for warfighters, 2004–2006.

=== Lineage ===
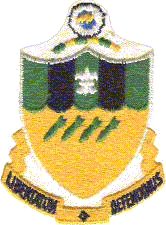
2d Bombardment Group patch

- Organized in France as: 1st Day Bombardment Group on 10 September 1918

Demobilized in France 17 January 1919

- Organized as 1st Day Bombardment Group, 18 September 1919

Re-designated: 2d Group (Bombardment) on 31 March 1921
Re-designated: 2d Bombardment Group, 14 March 1921
Re-designated: 2d Bombardment Group on 25 January 1923

- Consolidated with the 1st Day Bombardment Group (World War I), 8 April 1924
- Consolidated unit reconstituted as 2d Bombardment Group, 8 April 1924

Re-designated: 2d Bombardment Group (Heavy) on 6 December 1939
Re-designated: 2d Bombardment Group, Heavy on 20 August 1943
Inactivated on 28 February 1946

- Re-designated 2d Bombardment Group, Very Heavy on 1 May 1946

Activated on 1 July 1947
Re-designated 2d Bombardment Group, Medium on 12 July 1948
Inactivated on 16 June 1952

- Re-designated 2d Operations Group on 29 August 1991

Activated on 1 September 1991.

- Components designated as: 2d Air Expeditionary Group when deployed as part of an Air and Space Expeditionary unit after June 1996.

=== Assignments ===
- Air Service, United States First Army, 10 September- 17 December 1918
- Post Headquarters, Ellington Field, Texas, 18 September 1919
- Post Headquarters, Kelly Field, Texas, 25 September 1919
- 1st Wing, 1 January 1921
- 2d Wing, 1 June 1922
- Northeast Air District (later, First Air Force), 19 November 1940
- I Bomber Command, September 1941
- Army Air Forces Antisubmarine Command, 13 October 1942
- Second Air Force, 29 October 1942
- Northwest African Training Command, April 1943
- Northwest African Strategic Air Force, 20 April 1943
- XII Bomber Command, 1 September 1943
- 5th Bombardment Wing, 1 November 1943
- 40th Bombardment Wing, 15 December 1945 – 28 February 1946
- Strategic Air Command, 1 July 1947
- Eighth Air Force, 24 September 1947
- 2d Bombardment Wing, 5 November 1947 – 16 June 1952

Attached to 43rd Bombardment Wing, 5 November 1947 – 31 December 1948
Attached to 3rd Air Division, 18 February – 16 May 1950

- 2d Wing (later, 2d Bomb Wing), 1 September 1991 – present
- Air Combat Command when wing elements deployed to combat areas.

=== Components ===
World War I

- 11th Aero (later, 11th Squadron; 11th Bombardment; 11th Bomb): 10 September – 17 January 1919; 18 September 1919 – c. 3 June 1927; 1 July 1994 – present
- 20th Aero (later, 20th Squadron; 20th Bombardment; 20 Bomb): 10 September – 17 January 1919; 18 September 1919 – 28 February 1946; 1 July 1947 – 16 June 1952 (detached 10 February 1951 – 16 June 1952); 18 December 1992 – present
- 96 Aero (later, 96 Squadron; 96 Bombardment; 96 Bomb): 10 September – 10 January 1919; 18 September 1919 – 28 February 1946 (detached 12 November 1919 – 10 January 1921 and May – October 1921); 1 July 1947 – 16 June 1952 (detached 10 February 1951 – 16 June 1952); 1 October 1993 – present
- 166th Aero (later, 49th Squadron; 49th Bombardment) Squadron: c. 21 September – 21 November 1918; 18 September 1919 – 28 February 1946 (detached May – October 1921, August 1922 – January 1928, and December 1941 – June 1942); 1 July 1947 – 16 June 1952 (detached 10 February 1951 – 16 June 1952)

Inter-War era/World War II

- 41st Reconnaissance (later, 429th Bombardment): attached c. December 1940 – 24 February 1942, assigned 25 February 1942 – 28 February 1946 (detached 3 September 1941 – 29 October 1942)
- 49th Bombardment Squadron 1936 – 28 February 1946
- 54th Bombardment Squadron: 1 March 1935 – 1 September 1936 (detached entire period)

United States Air Force

- 2d Air Refueling Squadron: 1 January 1949 – 16 June 1952 (detached 10 February 1951 – 16 June 1952); 1 September 1991 – 1 June 1992
- 32d Air Refueling Squadron: 1 September 1991 – 1 June 1992
- 62d Bombardment Squadron: 1 September 1991 – 18 January 1993
- 71st Air Refueling Squadron: 1 September 1991 – 1 October 1993
- 596th Bombardment Squadron: 1 September 1991 – 1 October 1993.

=== Stations ===
- Amanty Aerodrome, France, 10 September 1918
- Maulan Aerodrome, France, 23 September – November 1918
- Ellington Field, Texas, 18 September 1919
- Kelly Field, Texas, c. 25 September 1919
- Langley Field, Virginia, 1 July 1922

Deployed at Alpena Airport, Michigan, 5–8 August 1940

- Ephrata Army Air Base, Washington, 29 October 1942
- Great Falls Army Air Base, Montana, 27 November 1942 – March 1943
- Camp Don B. Passage (Casablanca), French Morocco, 12 April 1943 (Ground echelon)
- Marrakesh, French Morocco, 16 April 1943 (air echelon)
- Navarin Airfield, Algeria, 22 April 1943 (air echelon), 25 April 1943 (ground echelon)
- Chateau-dun-du-Rhumel Airfield, Algeria, 27 April 1943
- Ain M'lila Airfield, Algeria, 17 June 1943
- Massicault Airfield, Tunisia, 31 July 1943
- Bizerte Airfield, Tunisia, 2 December 1943
- Amendola Airfield, Italy, c. 9 December 1943
- Foggia Airfield, Italy, 19 November 1945 – 28 February 1946
- Andrews Field, Maryland, 1 July 1947
- Davis-Monthan Field (later, Air Force Base), Arizona, 24 September 1947

Deployed at RAF Lakenheath, England, 10 August-c. 22 November 1948

- Chatham Air Force Base, Georgia, 1 May 1949

Deployed at RAF Marham, England, 18 February – 16 May 1950

- Hunter Field (later Air Force Base), Georgia, 22 September 1950 – 16 June 1952
- Barksdale Air Force Base, Louisiana, 1 September 1991 – present

=== Aircraft assigned ===
The 2 Operations Group's squadrons flew a variety of aircraft, and records do not always allow determining the exact dates the planes were received and lost. The following tabulation is as accurate as sources permit.

- Airco DH.4, 1918
- Breguet 14, 1918
- During the period 1919–1929 group crews flew DH-4, MB-2 (NBS-1), LB-1, Caproni bomber, and HP 0/400
- During the period 1928–1932 group crews flew LB-5, LB-7, B-3, and B-5
- The Y1B-9 was flown 1932–1936, and the B-6, 1931–1936
- During the period 1936–1942, the group flew Northrop A-17, A-20 Havoc, OA-9 Goose (1940–1941), Martin B-10 (1937–?), Boeing XB-15 (1938–1939), B-17D/E Flying Fortress (1937–1942), B-18 Bolo (1937–1942), B-25 Mitchell, B-23 Dragon, and B-34 Lexington
- During 1942–1945, the group flew B-17F/G Flying Fortress. B-29 Superfortress, 1947–1950
- B-50 Superfortress, 1949–1951
- B-52H Stratofortress, 1991–present
- KC-135 Stratotanker, 1991–1993
- KC-10 Extender, 1991–1992.

== See also ==
- Organization of the Air Service of the American Expeditionary Force
- 529th Air Service Group Support organization for the group in Italy
