= Craig Air Force Base =

U.S. Air Force training installation in Alabama

Coordinates: 32°20′38″N 086°59′16″W

Craig Field 1942 classbook

Craig Air Force Base near Selma, Alabama, was a U.S. Air Force undergraduate pilot training (UPT) installation that closed in 1977. Today the facility is a civilian airport known as Craig Field Airport and Industrial Complex (ICAO: KSEM; FAA: SEM).

== History ==
=== World War II ===
Originally built by U.S. Army Corps of Engineers for the U.S. Army Air Corps in 1940 to accommodate the growing number of flight trainees before World War II, Craig Field was one of the first training fields to offer single-engine training. Its first graduating class of 1941, the 39 cadets of Class 41D, completed the training course seven months before the United States' entry into World War II.

The naming of the base was important to the nearby city of Selma, and several names were considered. The name finally chosen was to honor 1st Lt Bruce Kilpatrick Craig, who was killed when his B-24 Liberator bomber crashed in June 1941. Craig was born in Selma and was initially commissioned as an officer in the Infantry Reserve prior to transferring to the U.S. Army Air Forces and attending flight training.

Army Air Forces pilot training through the first eleven months of 1941 was still considered as being peacetime and included a seventy-hour flying course. With the attack on Pearl Harbor on 7 December 1941, training was accelerated to speed the flow of pilots into combat. In total Craig Field graduated more than 9,000 pilots before the end of the war. Craig Field also saw a number of British Royal Air Force trainees. By 1943, 1,392 RAF cadets had earned their wings at Craig Field. Following the war, the mission of Craig Field changed from time to time, but it remained primarily a flight training base. When the U.S. Air Force was established as a separate service in 1947, Craig Field was renamed Craig Air Force Base.

=== Cold War ===
With the desperate need for additional pilots created by the Korean War, Craig AFB was once again placed in the pilot training business by initiating the 3615th Pilot Training Wing in September 1950. The program stopped its basic single engine training and focused its efforts on pilot instructor training. In 1972, the by then-3615th Flying Training Wing was replaced by the 29th Flying Training Wing of the Air Training Command and operated T-41, T-37 and T-38 training aircraft.

Representative of the time, Undergraduate Pilot Training Class 68-H, "The Haranguers," graduated with more than 50 new pilots in June 1968. Most of the pilots entered the "pipeline" for assignments to Vietnam in a variety of aircraft, including the F-4C and F-4E Phantom II, RF-4C Phantom II, EC-47 Skytrain and AC-47 Spooky gunship, C-7 Caribou and C-123 Provider. Other pilots went to Lockheed C-130 Hercules, Lockheed C-141 Starlifter, Boeing B-52 Stratofortress and Boeing KC-135 Stratotanker assignments. In addition to Air Force student pilots, the class included students from the U.S. Marine Corps, the Air National Guard and the then-Imperial Iranian Air Force.

As an active air force base, Craig had two 8,000-foot parallel runways, a large aircraft parking ramp and several large maintenance hangars.

=== Closure ===
In 1974, Craig AFB was selected as one of two UPT bases to be closed in a post-Vietnam economic move. In 1977, Air Training Command closed Craig Air Force Base along with Webb Air Force Base in Texas. The base's 29th Flying Training Wing was inactivated on 30 September 1977 and the field was placed on caretaker status the next day.

== Current use ==
After the base closed, the airfield was converted into a civil airport for Selma, Alabama, and renamed the Craig Field Airport and Industrial Complex. Although the former USAF air traffic control tower at Craig Field remains standing, as of 2007 it is unmanned and non-operational, with a smaller makeshift tower located in the middle of the tarmac, and run as a contract tower. Both parallel 8,000-foot runways still exist, but only one runway is currently operational while the other remains closed. The Craig VORTAC is no longer operational, but the Instrument Landing System (ILS) for the current Runway 33 remain operational on the field, as well as RNAV approaches. Current aircraft traffic averages approximately 106 daily operations, of which 83% are transient general aviation, 10% military (primarily Army, Navy and USAF training aircraft from bases in Alabama, Florida, and Mississippi) and 7% local general aviation or air taxi. Approach control is typically handled by Montgomery Approach.

The former military family housing was sold to individual owners shortly after base closure and has seen significant decay as compared to its previous military occupants.

Multiple civilian government and corporate tenants have taken up residency. One of these, L3 Communications/Vertex Aerospace (formerly Raytheon Aerospace), ran an aircraft maintenance and repair operations (MRO) facility focused on supporting Navy Beechcraft T-34 Mentor (T-34Cs), T-44A, TC-12F and Navy and USAF T-6A aircraft until 2007 when the facility was closed by the then-L3 Corporation, now L3Harris. The former on base elementary school continues to operate as the civilian-run Craig Elementary and the former base golf course continues to operate commercially as the Craig Golf Course and Driving Range. The building formerly operated by the Alabama Highway Patrol (AHP) as both its training academy and its headquarters for AHP's F Troop at Craig Field, is now an air traffic control training facility run by Advanced ATC.

== Units assigned ==
- 67th Air Base Group (later 67th Service Group) 16 December 1940-c. October 1942
- Air Corps Advanced Flying School (Single Engine) (later Army Air Forces Flying School (Advanced) c. 1 August 1941 – 15 December 1945
- 53d Air Base Group, c. 1 August 1941 – November 1941
- 73d Air Base Group, c. 1 August 1941-c. November 1941
- 28th Flying Training Wing, 8 January 1943-c. 1 August 1945
- 2138th AAF Base Unit, 1 May 1944 – 15 December 1945
- 44th AAF Base Unit (later 44th AF Base Unit), 16 December 1945 – 17 November 1947
- 501st Air University Wing, 17 November 1947 – 28 July 1948
- 3840th Air University Wing (later 3615th Pilot Training Wing, 3615th Flying Training Wing, 3615th Pilot Training Wing), 21 July 1948 – 1 July 1972
- USAF Pilot Instructor School (later Pilot Instructor School), 1 September 1950 – 1 September 1960
- USAF Pilot School, 5 January 1961 – 30 September 1977
- USAF Primary Pilot Instructor School, 1 September 1960 – 1 September 1961
- 29th Flying Training Wing – 29 March 1972 to 30 September 1977

43d Flying Training Squadron – 1 July 1972 to 30 September 1977

52d Flying Training Squadron – 1 July 1972 to 30 September 1977
