= 29th Flying Training Wing =

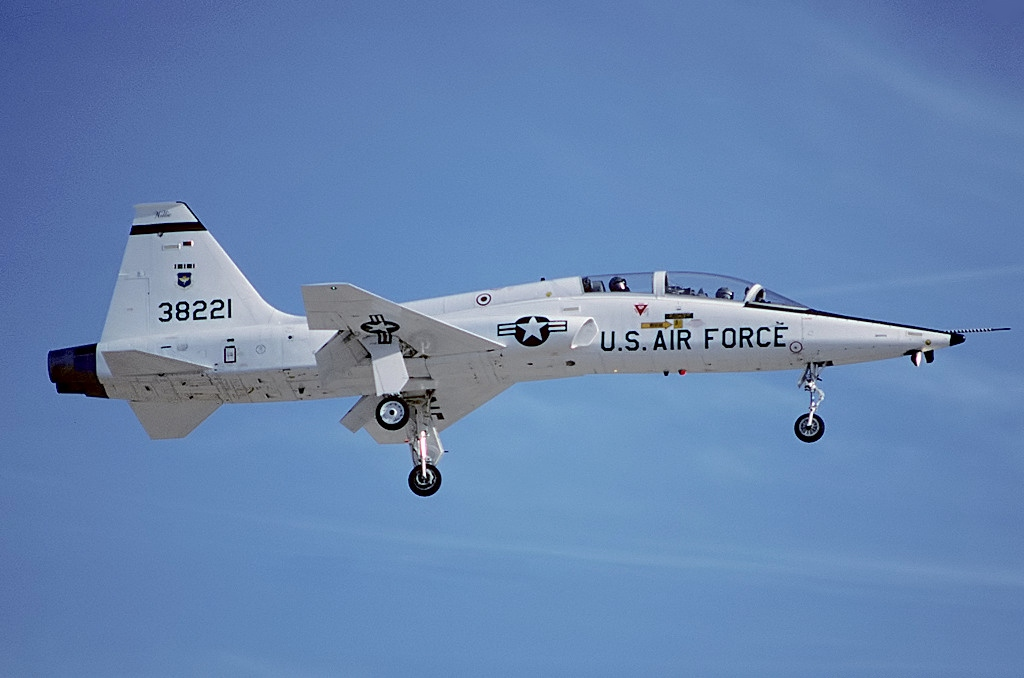
- T-38 Talon as flown by the 29th Flying Training Wing
- Active: 1939–1944; 1944–1946; 1972–1977
- Country: United States
- Branch: United States Air Force
- Role: Flying training
- Motto: Power for Peace
- Engagements: Pacific Theater of Operations
- Decorations: Distinguished Unit Citation Air Force Outstanding Unit Award

Insignia
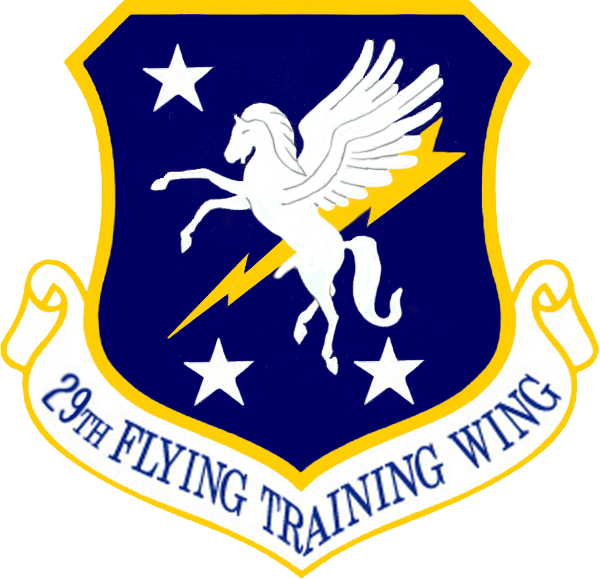
- 29th Flying Training Wing emblem (Note: Approved 12 March 1973.)

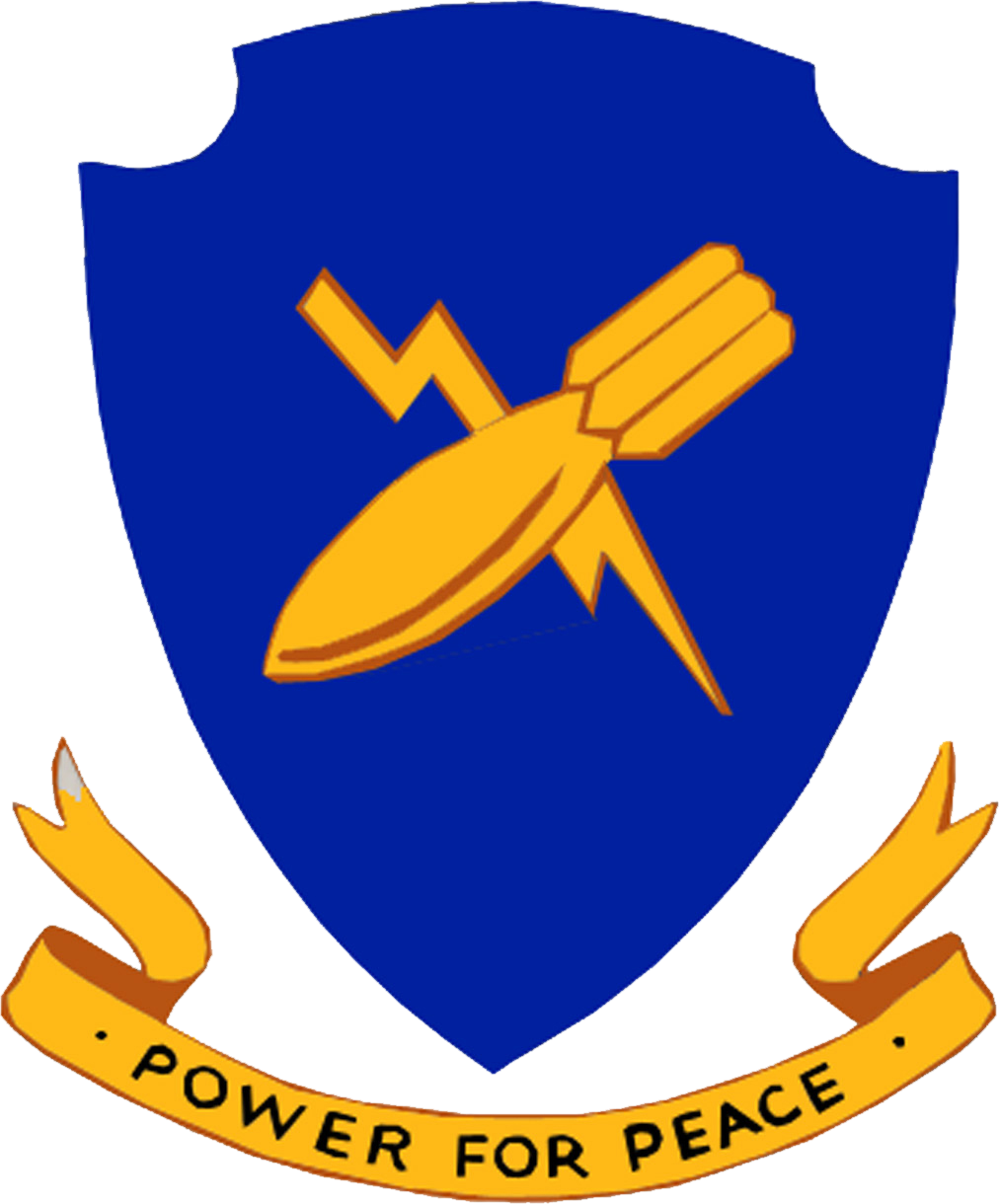
- 29th Bombardment Group emblem (Note: Approved 14 October 1940.)
- World War II tail code: Square O

The 29th Flying Training Wing is an inactive United States Air Force unit last based at Craig Air Force Base, Alabama. It was inactivated when Craig was closed when the Air Force reduced its pilot training program after the Vietnam War.

The unit began with its United States Army Air Forces World War II predecessor, the 29th Bombardment Group. It originally conducted anti-submarine warfare over the Gulf of Mexico during the early years of the war. Later, the 29th was a Replacement Training Unit. In 1944, the group was reequipped with Boeing B-29 Superfortresses and fought as part of Twentieth Air Force. The group's aircraft bombed Japan, during which it earned two Distinguished Unit Citations.

== History ==
=== World War II ===
The wing was first activated at Langley Field, Virginia, as the 29th Bombardment Group in January 1940. with the 6th, 43d and 52d Bombardment Squadrons assigned as its original components. Its organization was part of the pre-World War II buildup of the United States Army Air Corps after the breakout of war in Europe. In May, it moved to MacDill Field, Florida, where it was equipped with a mix of pre-production YB-17s and early model Boeing B-17 Flying Fortresses and Douglas B-18 Bolos.

In September 1941, the group expanded when a fourth squadron, the 21st Reconnaissance Squadron, was attached to it. The group was still at MacDill when the Japanese attacked Pearl Harbor, and it began to fly antisubmarine patrol missions in the Gulf of Mexico from January 1942. While the group was engaged in antisubmarine patrols, its 21st Reconnaissance Squadron was renamed the 411th Bombardment Squadron, recognizing that its mission no longer differed from that of the other three squadrons in the group. By the summer of 1942, the U-boat threat in the Gulf began to diminish, with all German submarines being withdrawn from the area by September.

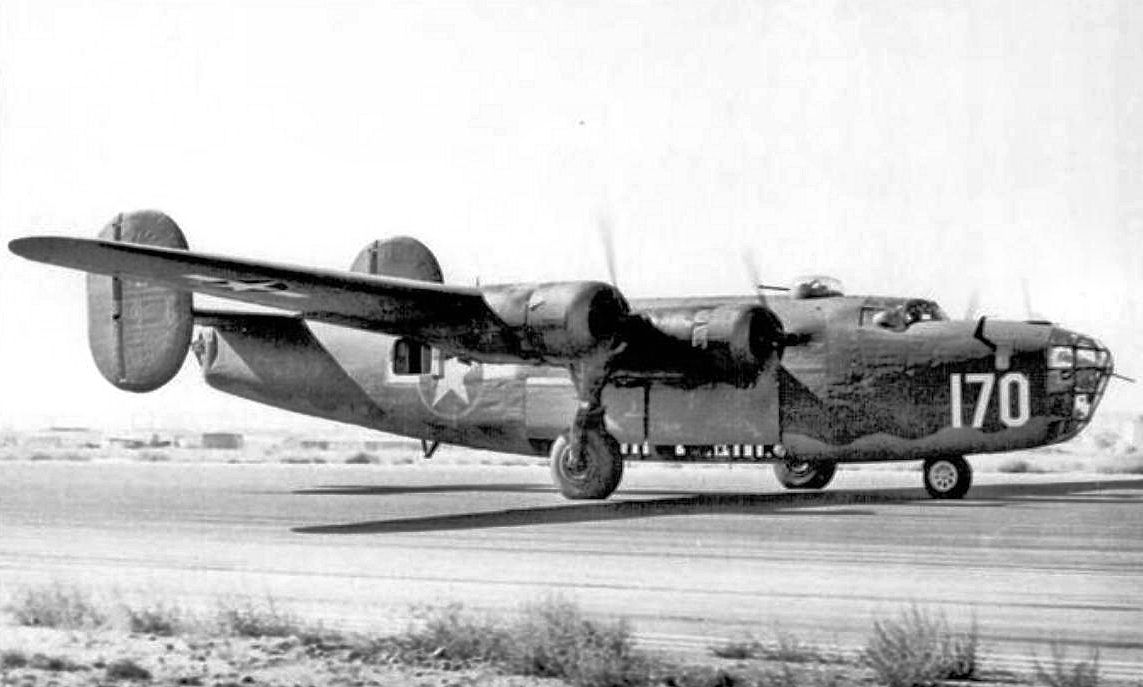
29th Bombardment Group B-24E Liberator in 1944

No longer needed in the Gulf, the group moved to Gowen Field, Idaho, where it became an Operational Training Unit (OTU) The OTU program involved the use of an oversized parent unit to provide cadres to "satellite groups". The 96th, 381st, 384th and 388th Bombardment Groups were all formed at Gowen in the second half of 1942.

In 1943, the 29th Group exchanged its B-17s for Consolidated B-24 Liberators. The group mission also changed as the Army Air Forces' (AAF) need for new units diminished and its need for replacements increased. The group became a Replacement Training Unit (RTU). Like OTUs, RTUs were oversized units, but their mission was to train individual pilots and aircrews. However, standard military units, like the 29th Group, were based on relatively inflexible tables of organization, and were not proving well adapted to the training mission. Accordingly, the AAF adopted a more functional system in which each base was organized into a separate numbered unit. The 29th Bombardment Group and its four squadrons were inactivated. Its personnel and equipment, along with that of supporting units at Gowen Field were combined into the 212th AAF Base Unit (Combat Crew Training School, Heavy) on 1 April 1944.

==== Combat in the Pacific ====
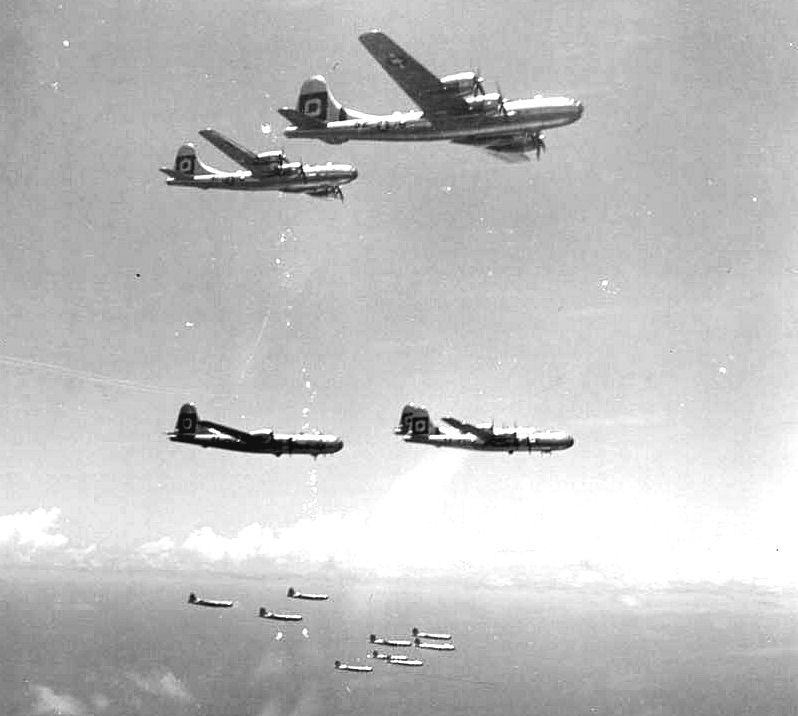
29th Bombardment Group B-29 Formation 1945

The AAF was organizing new Boeing B-29 Superfortress very heavy bombardment units, and the group was activated the same day at Pratt Army Air Field, Kansas. The group briefly returned to flying B-17s until B-29s became available for training. In May, The AAF reorganized its very heavy bomber units, and the 411th Bombardment Squadron was inactivated, leaving the group with its original three squadrons. The 29th continued training with the Superfortress until December 1944. Training included long range overwater flights to Borinquen Field, Puerto Rico.

The group deployed to North Field, Guam, where it became a component of the 314th Bombardment Wing of XXI Bomber Command. Its first combat mission was an attack on Tokyo on 25 February 1945. Until March 1945, it engaged primarily in daytime high altitude attacks on strategic targets, such as refineries and factories. The campaign against Japan switched that month and the group began to conduct low altitude night raids, using incendiaries against area targets. The group received a Distinguished Unit Citation (DUC) for a 31 March attack against an airfield at Omura, Japan. The group earned a second DUC in June for an attack on an industrial area of Shizuoka Prefecture, which included an aircraft factory operated by Mitsubishi and the Chigusa Arsenal.

Staff Sergeant Henry E."Red" Erwin was awarded the Medal of Honor for action that saved his B-29 during a mission over Koriyama, Japan, on 12 April 1945. Sgt Erwin was assigned to job of dropping white phosphorus bombs through a launching chute in the floor of his bomber. A bomb exploded in the chute and shot back into the plane, severely wounding Sgt Erwin and filling the plane with heavy smoke. Despite being blinded by the burning bomb, he picked it up, carried it forward to the cockpit area of the plane and threw it out an open window. Once the smoke had cleared, the pilot was able to pull the Superfortress out of a dive and recover at an emergency base.

During Operation Iceberg, the invasion of Okinawa, the group was diverted from the strategic campaign against Japanese industry and attacked airfields from which kamikaze attacks were being launched against the landing force. Following VJ Day, the group dropped food and supplies to Allied prisoners of war and participated in several show of force missions over Japan. It also conducted reconnaissance flights over Japanese cities. The group remained on Guam until it was inactivated in March 1946.

=== Pilot Training ===
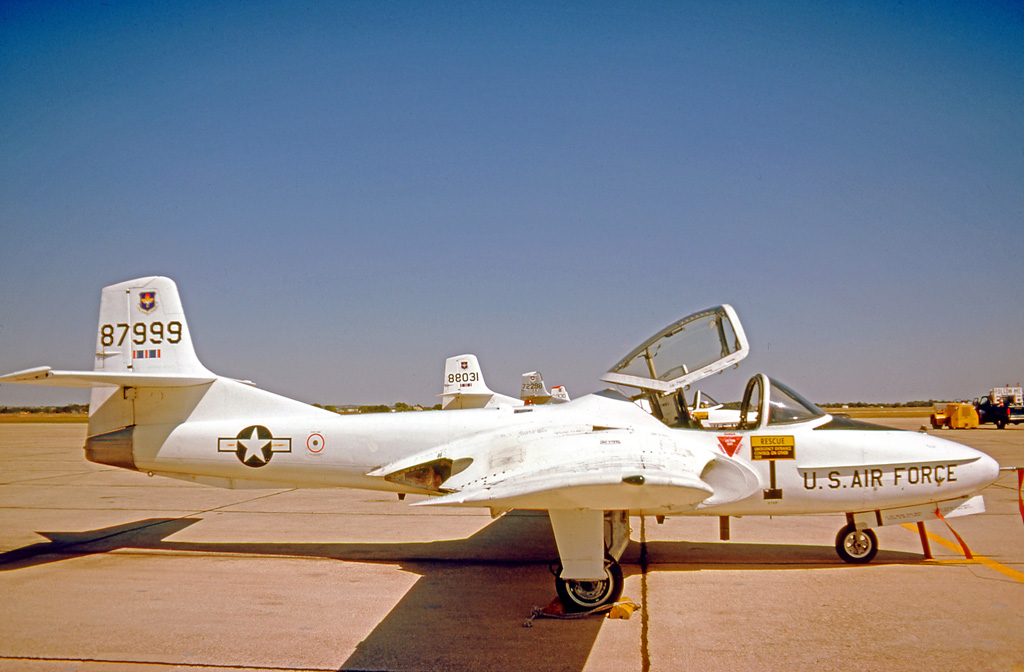
Cessna T-37B

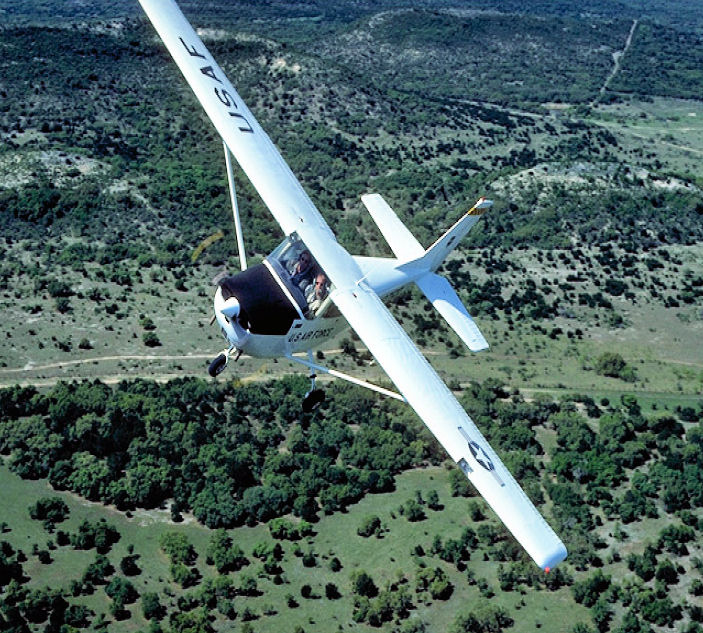
Cessna T-41 Mescalero

The 29th Flying Training Wing replaced, and absorbed resources of, the 3615th Pilot Training Wing on 1 July 1972 at Craig Air Force Base, Alabama. The 29th conducted undergraduate pilot training (UPT) and operated Craig facilities. In 1974, Craig was selected as one of two UPT bases to be closed in a post-Vietnam economic move. In 1977, Air Training Command closed Craig Air Force Base along with Webb Air Force Base in Texas. The wing was inactivated on 30 September 1977, and the field was placed on caretaker status the next day.

== Lineage ==
29th Bombardment Group

- Constituted as the 29th Bombardment Group (Heavy) on 22 December 1939

Activated on 1 February 1940
Inactivated on 1 April 1944

- Redesignated 29th Bombardment Group, Very Heavy and activated on 1 April 1944

Inactivated on 20 May 1946

- Consolidated with the 29th Flying Training Wing as the 29th Flying Training Wing on 31 January 1984

29th Flying Training Wing

- Established as the 29th Flying Training Wing on 22 March 1972

Activated on 1 July 1972
Inactivated on 30 September 1977

- Consolidated with the 29th Bombardment Group on 31 January 1984 (remained inactive)

=== Assignments ===
- General Headquarters Air Force, 1 February 1940
- Southeast Air District, 21 May 1940
- 3d Bombardment Wing, c. October 1940
- II Bomber Command, 25 June 1942 – 1 April 1944
- II Bomber Command, 1 April 1944 (attached to 17th Bombardment Operational Training Wing after c. 15 April 1944)
- 314th Bombardment Wing, 9 November 1944 – 20 May 1946 (attached to 17th Bombardment Operational Training Wing until 17 December 1944)
- Air Training Command, 1 July 1972 – 30 September 1977

=== Components ===
- 6th Bombardment Squadron: 1 February 1940 – 1 April 1944, 1 April 1944 – 20 May 1946
- 21st Reconnaissance Squadron (later 411th Bombardment Squadron): Attached 5 September 1941, assigned 25 February 1942 – 1 April 1944; 1 April – 10 May 1944
- 43d Bombardment Squadron (later 43d Flying Training Squadron): 1 February 1940 – 1 April 1944; 1 Apr 1944 – 20 May 1946, 1 July 1972 – 30 September 1977
- 52d Bombardment Squadron (later 52d Flying Training Squadron): 1 February 1940 – 1 April 1944; 1 Apr 1944 – 20 May 1946, 1 July 1972 – 30 September 1977

=== Stations ===
- Langley Field, Virginia, 1 February 1940
- MacDill Field, Florida 21 May 1940
- Gowen Field, Idaho 25 June 1942 – 1 April 1944
- Pratt Army Air Field, Kansas 1 April – 7 December 1944
- North Field, Guam, Mariana Islands, 17 January 1945 – 20 May 1946
- Craig Air Force Base, Alabama, 1 July 1972 – 30 September 1977

=== Aircraft ===
- Douglas B-18 Bolo, 1940–1942
- Boeing B-17C Flying Fortress, 1940–1943
- Consolidated B-24 Liberator, 1943–1944
- Boeing B-29 Superfortress, 1944–1946
- Cessna T-37 Tweet, 1972–1977
- Northrop T-38 Talon, 1972–1977
- Cessna T-41 Mescalero, 1972–1973

== See also ==
- B-17 Flying Fortress units of the United States Army Air Forces
- B-24 Liberator units of the United States Army Air Forces
- List of B-29 Superfortress operators
