= 43rd Flying Training Squadron =

43d Flying Training Squadron
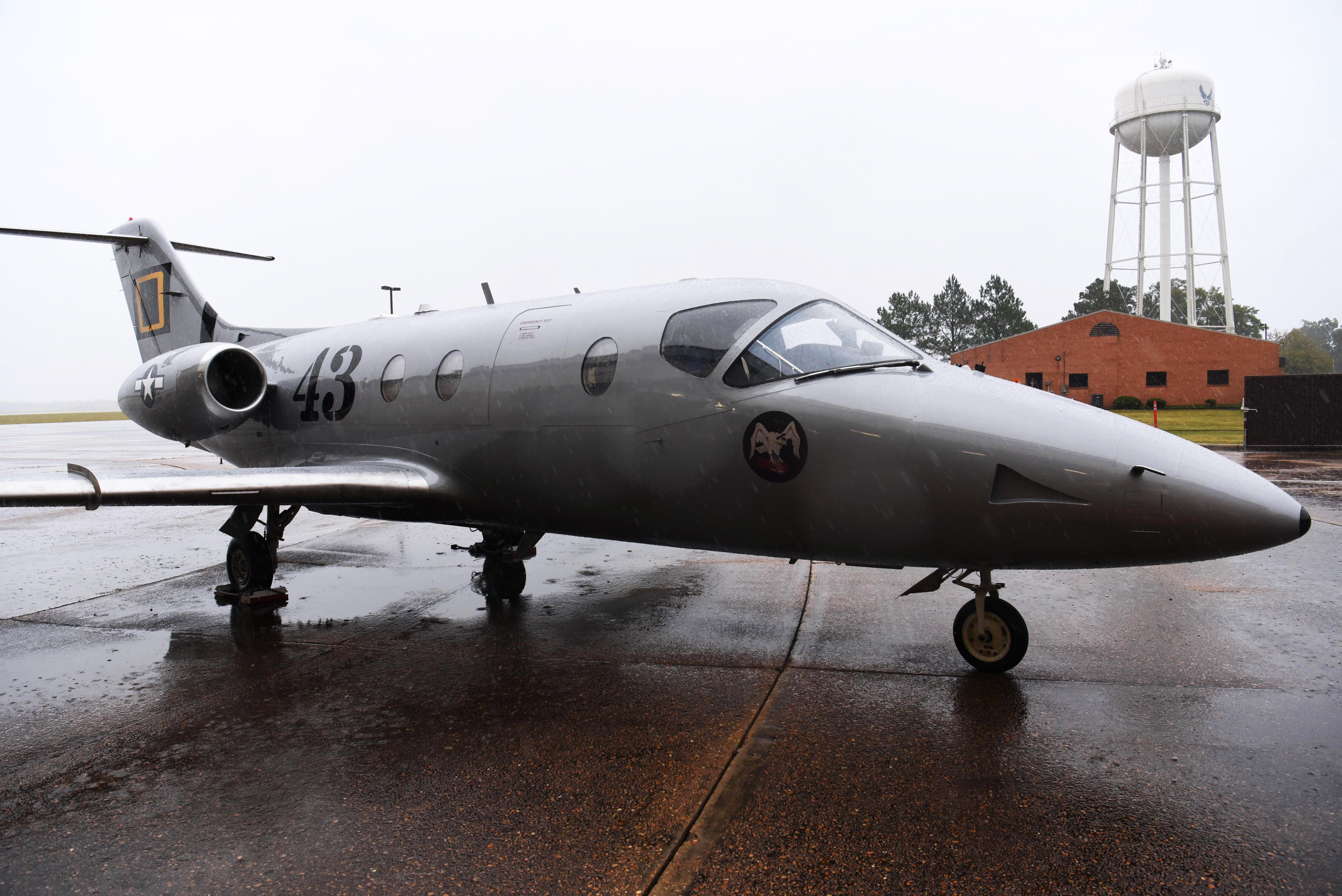
- 43rd Flying Training Squadron T-1 Jayhawk
- Active: 1940–1946; 1972–1977; 1990–1992; 1997–present
- Country: United States
- Branch: United States Air Force
- Role: Pilot Training
- Part of: Air Force Reserve Command
- Garrison/HQ: Columbus Air Force Base
- Engagements: Antisubmaine Campaign; Western Pacific
- Decorations: Distinguished Unit Citation; Air Force Outstanding Unit Award

Commanders
- Current commander: Lt. Col. A.M.
- Notable commanders: Robert F. Travis

Insignia
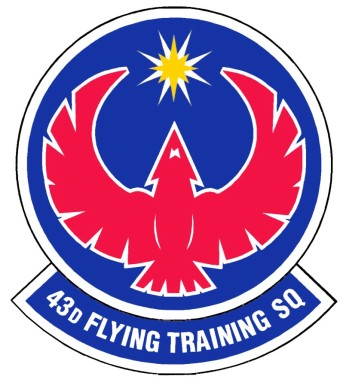
- 43d Flying Training Squadron emblem (Note: Approved 30 May 1973.)

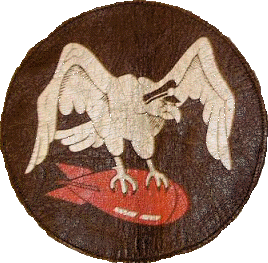
- Patch with 43d Bombardment Squadron emblem (Note: Approved 18 April 1942. The official emblem has a white background.)

The 43rd Flying Training Squadron is part of the 340th Flying Training Group and is the reserve associate to the 14th Flying Training Wing based at Columbus Air Force Base, Mississippi. It operates Raytheon T-1 Jayhawk, Beechcraft T-6 Texan II and Northrop T-38 Talon aircraft conducting flight training.

== History ==
=== Antisubmarine warfare and heavy bomber training ===
The squadron was first activated at Langley Field, Virginia, as the 43rd Bombardment Squadron in January 1940, one of the original squadrons of the 29th Bombardment Group. Its organization was part of the pre-World War II buildup of the United States Army Air Corps after the breakout of war in Europe. In May, it moved to MacDill Field, Florida, where it was equipped with a mix of pre-production YB-17s and early model Boeing B-17 Flying Fortresses and Douglas B-18 Bolos. The squadron was still at MacDill when the Japanese attacked Pearl Harbor, and it began to fly antisubmarine patrol missions in the Gulf of Mexico from January 1942. By the summer of 1942, the U-boat threat in the Gulf began to diminish, with all German submarines being withdrawn from the area by September.

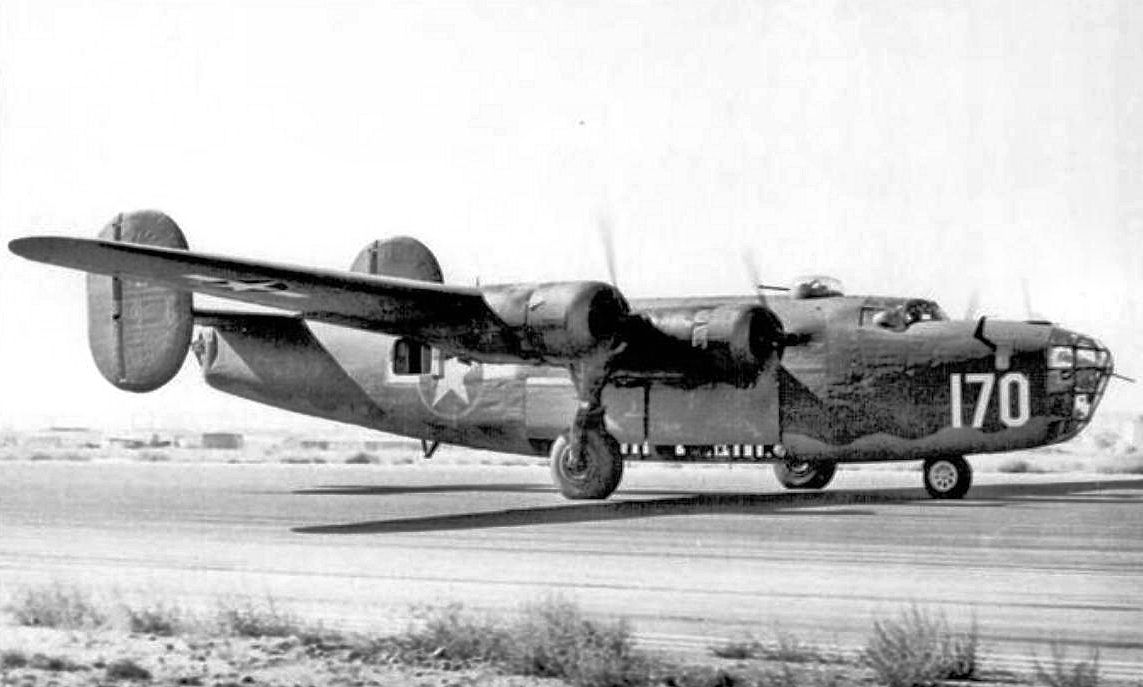
29th Bombardment Group B-24E Liberator in 1944

No longer needed in the Gulf, the squadron moved to Gowen Field, Idaho, where it became an Operational Training Unit (OTU) The OTU program involved the use of an oversized parent unit to provide cadres to "satellite groups". The 96th, 381st, 384th and 388th Bombardment Groups were all formed at Gowen in the second half of 1942.

In 1943, the squadron exchanged its B-17s for Consolidated B-24 Liberators. The squadron mission also changed as the Army Air Forces' (AAF) need for new units diminished and its need for replacements increased. The squadron became a Replacement Training Unit (RTU). Like OTUs, RTUs were oversized units, but their mission was to train individual pilots and aircrews. However, standard military units, like the 6th Squadron, were based on relatively inflexible tables of organization, and were not proving well adapted to the training mission. Accordingly, a more functional system was adopted in which each base was organized into a separate numbered unit. The 29th Bombardment Group and its squadrons (including the 6th) were inactivated. Its personnel and equipment, along with that of supporting units at Gowen Field were combined into the 212th AAF Base Unit (Combat Crew Training School, Heavy) on 1 April 1944.

=== Combat in the Pacific ===
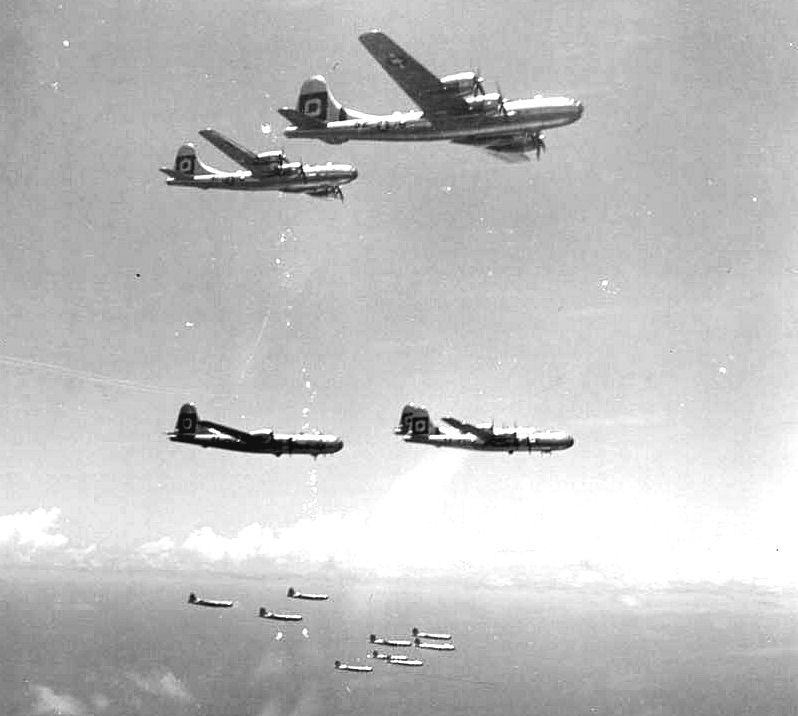
29th Bombardment Group B-29 Formation 1945

The AAF was organizing new Boeing B-29 Superfortress very heavy bombardment units, and the squadron was activated the same day at Pratt Army Air Field, Kansas. It briefly returned to flying B-17s until B-29s became available for training. It continued training with the Superfortress until December 1944. Training included long range overwater flights to Borinquen Field, Puerto Rico.

It deployed to North Field, Guam, where it became a component of the 314th Bombardment Wing of XXI Bomber Command. Its first combat mission was an attack of Tokyo on 25 February 1945. Until March 1945, it engaged primarily in daytime high altitude attacks on strategic targets, such as refineries and factories. The campaign against Japan switched that month and the squadron began to conduct low altitude night raids, using incendiaries against area targets. The squadron received a Distinguished Unit Citation (DUC) for a 31 March attack against an airfield at Omura, Japan. The squadron earned a second DUC in June for an attack on an industrial area of Shizuoka Prefecture, which included an aircraft factory operated by Mitsubishi and the Chigusa Arsenal.

During Operation Iceberg, the invasion of Okinawa, the squadron was diverted from the strategic campaign against Japanese industry and attacked airfields from which kamikaze attacks were being launched against the landing force. Following VJ Day, the squadron dropped food and supplies to Allied prisoners of war and participated in several show of force missions over Japan. It also conducted reconnaissance flights over Japanese cities. The squadron remained on Guam until it was inactivated in March 1946.

=== United States Air Force ===
It conducted undergraduate pilot training from, 1972–1977, 1990–1992, and since 1997.

The squadron administers and executes the Air Education and Training Command/Air Force Reserve Command Associate Instructor Pilot (IP) Program and provides Active Guard Reserve (AGR) and Traditional Reserve (TR) IPs to augment the cadre of active duty pilots conducting pilot training. During wartime, or in the event of hostilities, the unit is mobilized to offset anticipated losses of experienced active duty pilot contributions to the instructor pilot training programs.

== Lineage ==
- Constituted as the 29 Bombardment Squadron (Heavy) on 22 December 1939

Activated on 1 February 1940
Redesignated 43 Bombardment Squadron (Heavy) on 13 March 1940
Inactivated on 1 April 1944

- Redesignated 43 Bombardment Squadron, Very Heavy and activated on 1 April 1944

Inactivated on 20 May 1946
Redesignated 43 Flying Training Squadron on 22 March 1972

- Activated on 1 July 1972

Inactivated on 30 September 1977

- Activated on 25 June 1990

Inactivated on 1 October 1992

- Redesignated 43 Flying Training Flight and activated in the reserve on 1 April 1997

Redesignated 43 Flying Training Squadron on 1 April 1998

=== Assignments ===
- 29th Bombardment Group, 1 February 1940 – 1 April 1944
- 29th Bombardment Group, 1 April 1944 – 20 May 1946
- 29th Flying Training Wing, 1 July 1972 – 30 September 1977
- 14th Flying Training Wing, 25 June 1990
- 14th Operations Group, 15 December 1991 – 1 October 1992
- 610th Regional Support Group, 1 April 1997
- 340th Flying Training Group, 1 April 1998 – present

=== Stations ===
- Langley Field, Virginia, 1 February 1940
- MacDill Field, Florida, 21 May 1940
- Pope Field, North Carolina, c. 7 Dec 1941
- MacDill Field, Florida, 1 January 1942
- Gowen Field, Idaho, 25 June 1942 – 1 April 1944
- Pratt Army Air Field, Kansas, 1 April 1944
- Dalhart Army Air Field, Texas, 25 May 1944
- Pratt Army Air Field, Kansas, 17 July (ground echelon only until 21 August–7 December 1944;
- North Field, Guam, Mariana Islands, 17 January 1945 – 20 May 1946
- Craig Air Force Base, Alabama, 1 July 1972 – 30 September 1977
- Columbus Air Force Base, Mississippi, 25 June 1990 – 1 October 1992
- Columbus Air Force Base, Mississippi, 1 April 1997 – present)

=== Aircraft ===
- Douglas B-18 Bolo (1940–1941)
- Boeing B-17 Flying Fortress (1940–1944)
- Consolidated B-24 Liberator (1943–1944)
- Boeing B-29 Superfortress (1944–1946)
- Cessna T-37 Tweet (1990–1992, 1998–2008)
- Beechcraft T-6 Texan II (2007–present)
- Northrop T-38 Talon (1998–present)
- Raytheon T-1 Jayhawk (1998–present)

=== Awards ===
- Decorations: Distinguished Unit Citations: 31 Mar 1945; 19-26 Jun 1945. Air Force Outstanding Unit Awards: 1 Jan-31 Dec 1973; 1 Oct 2001-30 Sep 2003; 1 Oct 2003-30 Sep 2004.
