= 20th Bomb Squadron =

US Air Force unit

20th Bomb Squadron

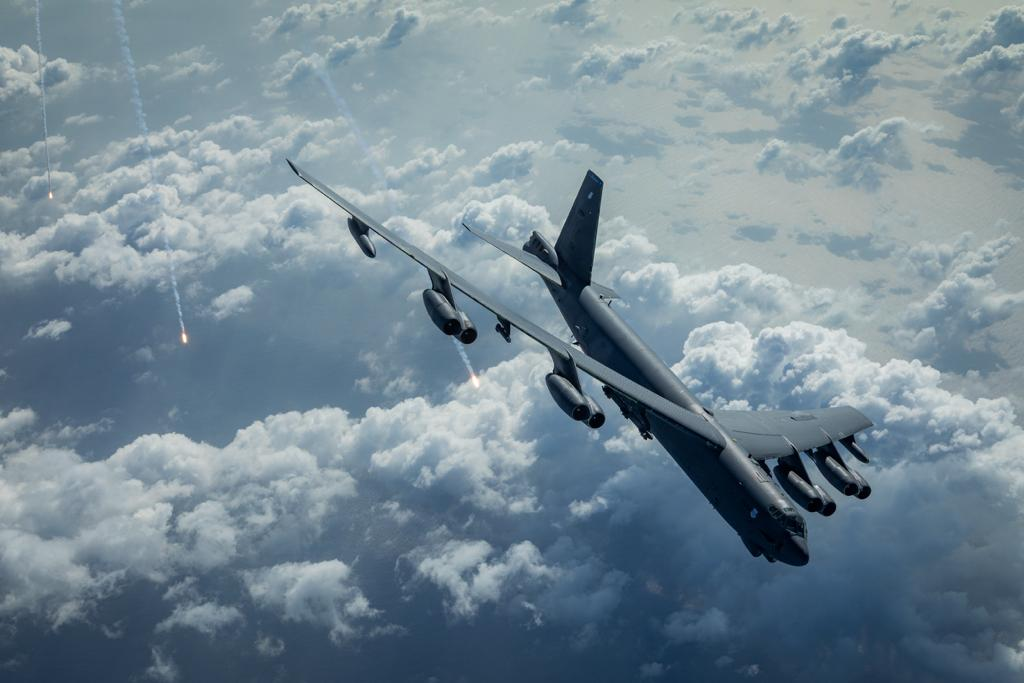
- A 20th Expeditionary Bomb Squadron B-52 Stratofortress releases flares over the Indian Ocean following a mission in 2020.
- Active: 1917–1946; 1947–present
- Country: United States
- Branch: United States Air Force
- Type: Squadron
- Role: Bomber
- Part of: Global Strike Command
- Garrison/HQ: Barksdale Air Force Base, Louisiana
- Nickname: Buccaneers
- Engagements: World War I; World War II – Antisubmarine; World War II – EAME Theater
- Decorations: Distinguished Unit Citation; Air Force Outstanding Unit Award with Combat "V" Device; Air Force Outstanding Unit Award; Republic of Vietnam Gallantry Cross with Palm

Insignia
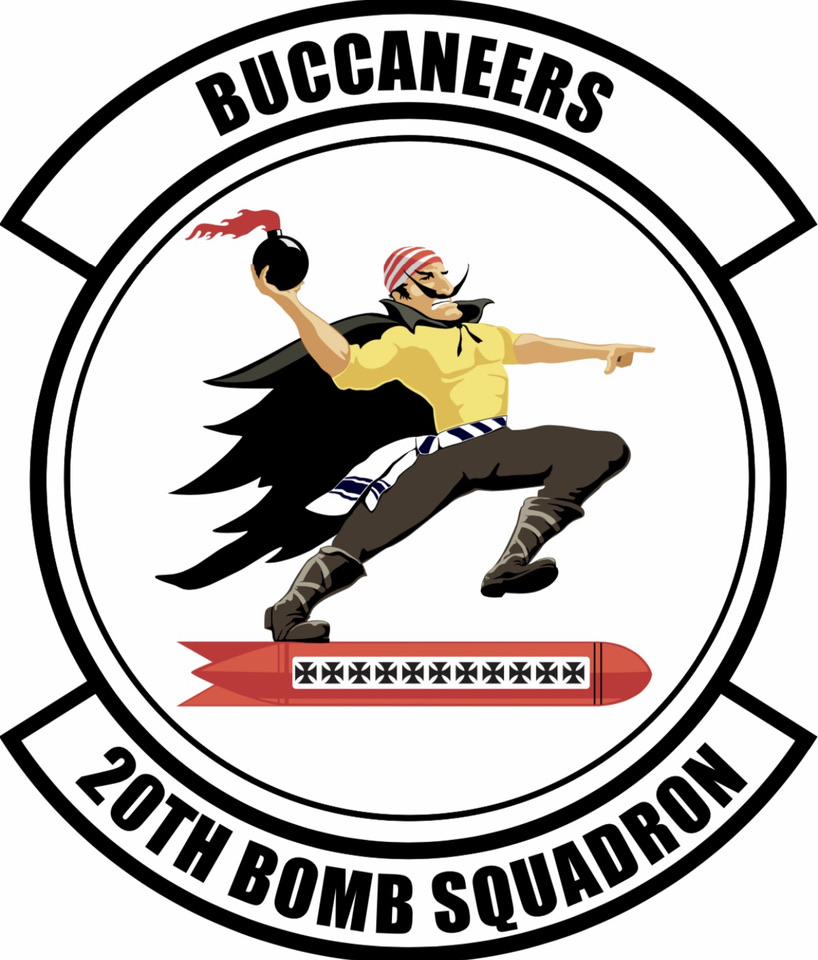
- 20th Bomb Squadron emblem (updated 2019)

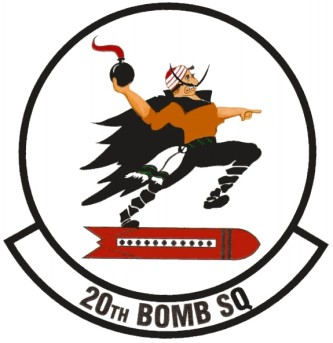
- 20th Bomb Squadron emblem (modified c. 1995)

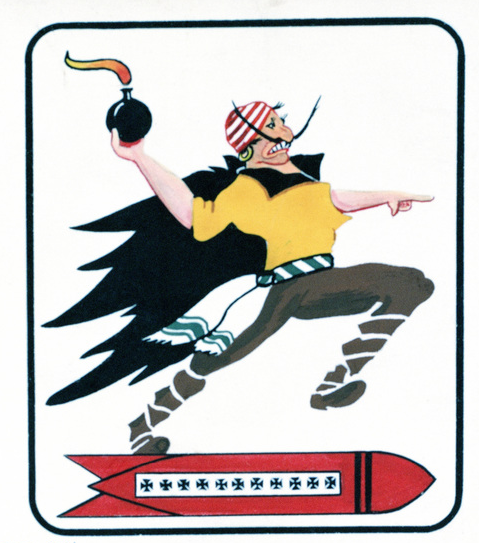
- 20th Bombardment Squadron emblem (approved 12 June 1924)

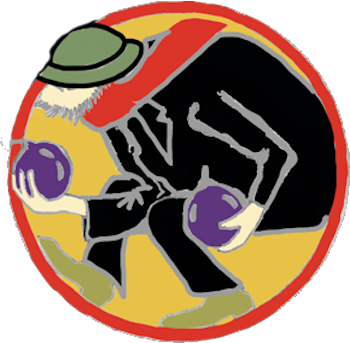
- 20th Aero Squadron emblem (approved by AEF 18 November 1918)
- Tail Code: LA

Aircraft flown
- Bomber: Boeing B-52 Stratofortress

The 20th Bomb Squadron is a unit of the 2d Operations Group of the United States Air Force located at Barksdale Air Force Base, Louisiana. The 20th is equipped with the Boeing B-52H Stratofortress.

Formed in May 1917 as the 20th Aero Squadron, the squadron saw combat in France on the World War I Western Front. It took part in the St. Mihiel offensive and Meuse-Argonne offensive.

After the war, it served with the Army Air Service and Army Air Corps as the 20th Bombardment Squadron During the 1920s and 1930s, the squadron was involved in field service testing of new bomber aircraft, notably the Y1B-17 Flying Fortress.

During World War II the squadron fought in the North African and Italian Campaigns. It was awarded a Distinguished Unit Citation for its actions during a raid on Steyr, Austria.

It was a part of Strategic Air Command during the Cold War. As a medium bomber squadron it deployed to stand alert at forward bases in Operation Reflex. After equipping with Boeing B-52 Stratofortresses stood nuclear alert, but during the Viet Nam War the squadron deployed frequently to perform Operation Arc Light bombing missions. Since 1993, the 20th Bomb Squadron has flown the B-52H Stratofortress long-range strategic bomber, which can perform a variety of missions. Today the squadron is engaged in the global war on terrorism.

== History ==
=== World War I ===
The squadron was first organized as the 20th Aero Squadron at Kelly Field, Texas on 17 May 1917. On 29 July 1917, under command of Captain W.W. Wynne, the squadron moved to Wilbur Wright Field, Dayton, Ohio, where it received its first training in the handling of Curtiss JN-4 and Standard J-1 aircraft. It deployed to France where it was assigned to the 1st Day Bombardment Group. Assigned British de Havilland DH-4 aircraft with American Liberty engines, and was engaged in combat during the St. Mihiel offensive and Meuse-Argonne offensive during 1918. After the 1918 Armistice with Germany, the squadron returned to the United States and arrived at Mitchel Field, New York on 2 May 1919. There most of the men were discharged from Army service and returned to civilian life.

=== Inter-War period ===
After the squadron returned to the United States it re-formed with new personnel at Ellington Field, Houston Texas in June 1919. The 20th equipped with some de Havilland DH-4 bombers and moved to Kelly Field. it was assigned to the new 1st Day Bombardment (later, 2d Bombardment) Group. After the establishment of the permanent United States Army Air Service in 1921, it was redesignated as the 20th Squadron (Bombardment). During this period, the unit also operated some Martin NBS-1s and British Handley Page 0/400s.

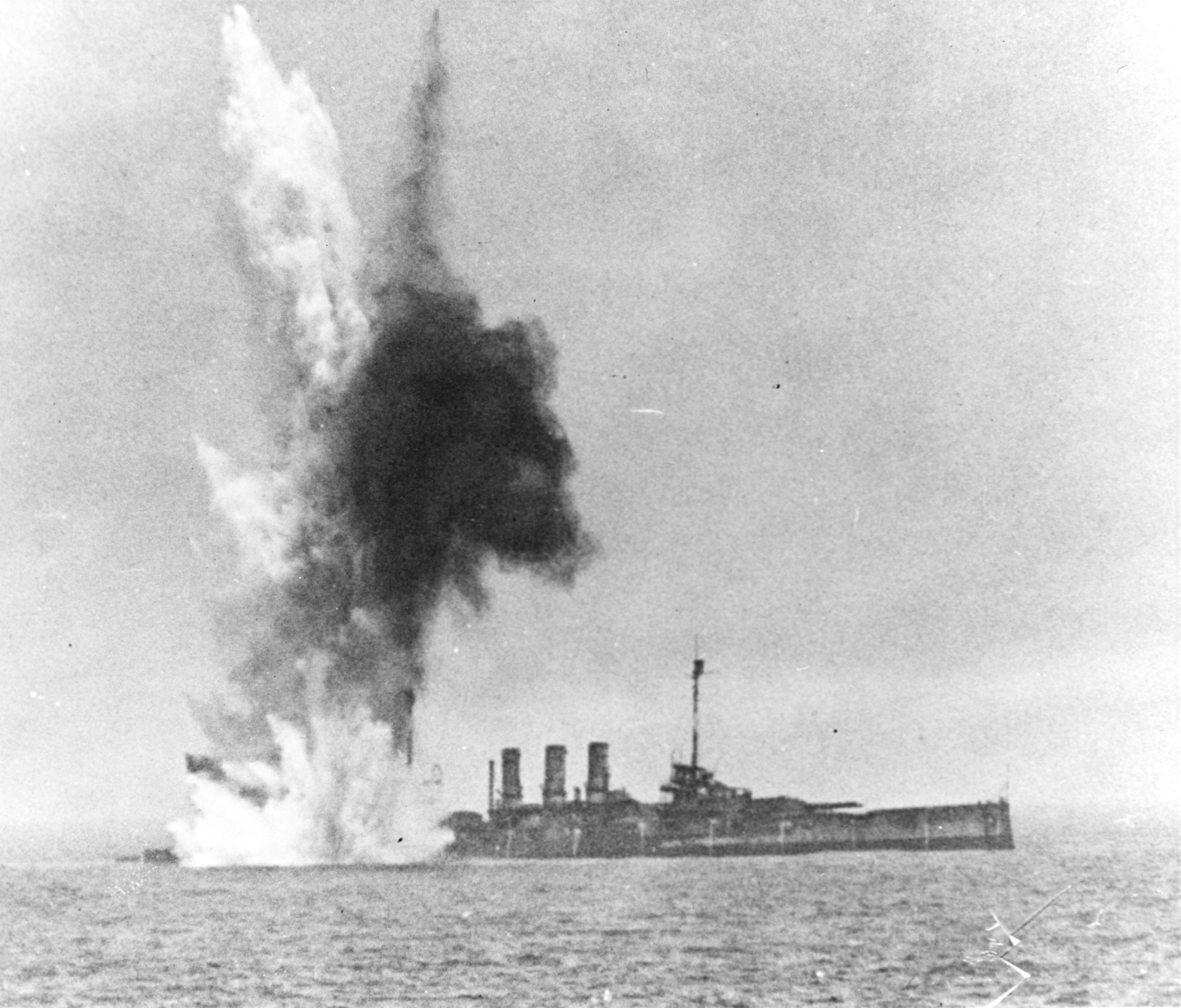
A 2,000 lb. bomb "near-miss" severely damages Ostfriesland at the stern hull plates

In May 1920 the squadron was temporarily assigned to Langley Field, Virginia and became part of the First Provisional Air Brigade under Brigadier General Billy Mitchell. It trained with Handley Page O/400 and Martin MB-2 bombers. Its mission would be to attack captured German ships along the Atlantic coast off Virginia in a service demonstration to determine whether a battleship could be sunk by bombing. The targets were an aged and surplus US battleship and four former German Navy vessels, including the battleship SMS Ostfriesland, obtained in the peace settlement after World War I and scheduled for scuttling.

After the completion of the demonstration, the squadron moved permanently to Langley on 30 June 1922. During the 1920s and 1930s the squadron was used for service testing of new bombardment aircraft as they were developed and improved, primarily Keystone Aircraft light biplane bombers in the 1920s. These planes became the backbone of the Army Air Corps bomber fleet in the latter part of the decade. In 1932 the squadron received and began service testing the Boeing Y1B-9, the first American all-metal monoplane bomber aircraft design. The high speed of the Y1B-9A indicated that open cockpits were now impractical, and that enclosed cockpits would be needed in the future. The Boeing B-9 made obsolete the Keystone Biplane bombers then in service. The Martin B-10 replaced the B-9 in 1936, but the squadron operated the B-10 for only a brief time.

In 1937 the squadron received the new Boeing Y1B-17 four-engine heavy bomber. Twelve Y1B-17s were delivered to the 2d Bombardment Group for evaluation. At this time, the dozen Y1B-17s comprised the entire heavy bombardment strength of the United States. The 20th spent its time working out the defects in the prototype aircraft, working with Boeing engineers to make corrections for the final production model B-17B. One recommendation was the use of a checklist that the pilot and copilot would use together before takeoff, hopefully preventing accidents such as the one which resulted in the loss of the original Boeing Model 299.

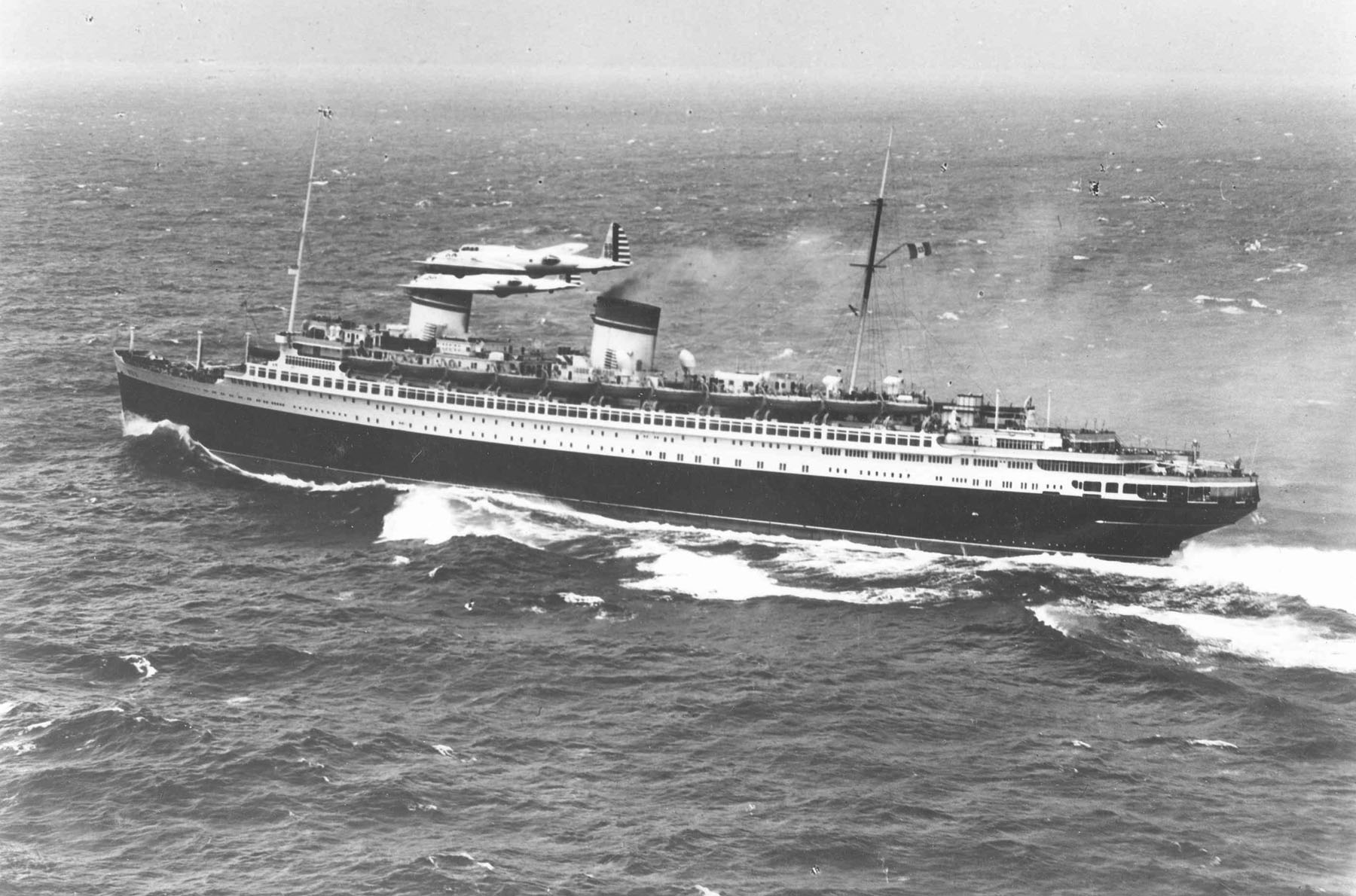
20th BS Boeing Y1B-17s fly-by near the Italian liner "Rex," about 800 miles east of New York City, 12 May 1938.

Six planes of the squadron took part in a good will flight from Langley to Buenos Aires, Argentina, taking off from Langley on 15 February 1938 and returning on 27 February. They covered a total of 12,000 miles without serious incident. In May 1938, planes of the squadron took part in a demonstration in which they "intercepted" the Italian ocean liner SS Rex while it was still 700 miles out in the Atlantic Ocean. This demonstration of the Y1B-17's range and navigational capabilities, but also showed how useful the plane could be in attacking an enemy invasion force before it came close enough to American shores to do any damage. The Navy was not amused by this particular demonstration, and was furious about what it perceived to be Army intrusion into the Navy's mission. Shortly thereafter, the War Department restricted the activities of the Army Air Corps to a 100-mile range of the US shoreline. The Y1B-17s flew for three years without a serious accident, and were transferred to the 19th Bombardment Group at March Field in October 1940. The squadron received new production Boeing B-17D Fortresses to replace them.

=== World War II ===
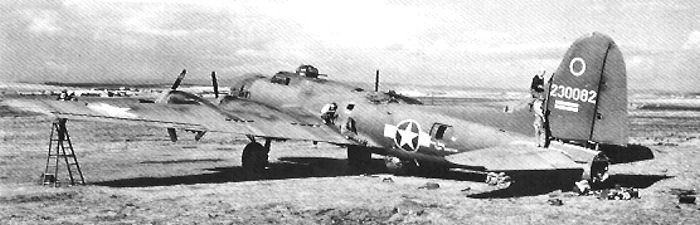
Boeing B-17F-85-BO Fortress 42-30082 from the 20th Bomb Squadron undergoes maintenance in the open at Ain M'lila Airfield, Algeria in the late summer of 1943.

After the Attack on Pearl Harbor, the squadron served on antisubmarine duty along the mid-Atlantic coastline as part of I Bomber Command for several months until it was reorganized as AAF Antisubmarine Command.

The squadron re-equipped with more modern B-17F Flying Fortresses and moved to Ephrata Army Air Field, Washington for transition and combat training in late 1942 and early 1943. It moved to North Africa in April 1943, carrying out bombing missions in Algeria and Tunisia as part of Twelfth Air Force during the North African Campaign. The unit flew many support and air interdiction missions, bombing such targets as marshalling yards, airfields, troop concentrations, bridges, docks, and shipping. The 20th participated in the defeat of Axis forces in Tunisia during April and May 1943; the reduction of Pantelleria and the preparations for Operation Husky, the invasion of Sicily, in May through July 1943; and Operation Avalanche, the invasion of Italy in September.

The squadron was transferred to Fifteenth Air Force control in December 1943 and engaged in bombing operations primarily in Italy in support of the Allied drive north toward Rome from January to June 1944. It also supported Operation Dragoon, the invasion of southern France in August 1944 and the campaigns against German forces in northern Italy from June 1944 until the end of the war. The unit engaged primarily in long-range bombardment of strategic targets after October 1943, attacking oil refineries, aircraft factories, steel plants, and other objectives in Germany, Poland, Czechoslovakia, Austria, Hungary, Yugoslavia, Romania, and Greece.

En route to bomb a vital aircraft factory at Steyr, Austria during Big Week on 24 February 1944, the group was greatly outnumbered by enemy interceptors, but it maintained its formation and bombed the target, receiving a Distinguished Unit Citation (DUC) for the performance. On the following day, while on a mission to attack aircraft factories at Regensburg, it met similar opposition equally well and was awarded a second DUC. The 20th served as part of the occupation force in Italy after V-E Day and was inactivated in Italy on 28 February 1946.

=== Strategic Air Command ===
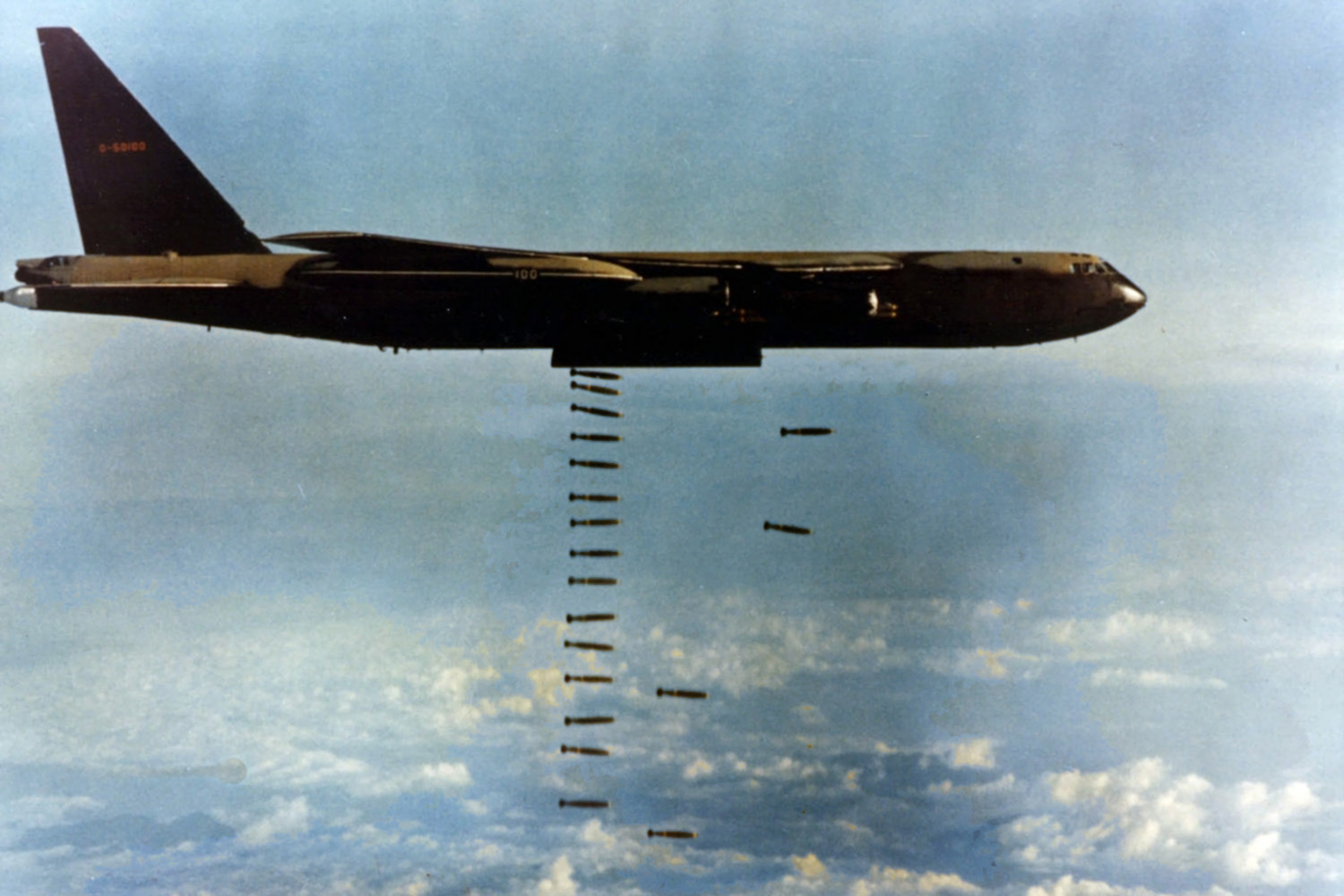
A U.S. Air Force Boeing B-52D-60-BO Stratofortress (s/n 55-0100) dropping bombs over Vietnam.

The squadron was reactivated as a Boeing B-29 Superfortress very heavy bomber squadron under Strategic Air Command in 1947 and assigned to Chatham Air Force Base near Savannah, Georgia, until Hunter Air Force Base was ready to accept the 2d Bombardment Wing. it flew B-29 and later Boeing B-50 Superfortresses during the early postwar era. The 20th participated in electronic countermeasures testing and evaluation from May 1950 until May 1952. Equipped with B-47 Stratojet medium bombers in 1954, flying training missions and standing nuclear alert until the phaseout of the B-47 in 1963.

The squadron moved to Barksdale Air Force Base, where it began to re-equip with the Boeing B-52F Stratofortress in 1963. The squadron was moved to Carswell Air Force Base on 25 June 1965, joining the 9th Bombardment Squadron as the second B-52F squadron at Carswell. During the Vietnam War, the squadron would switch rotations to Andersen AFB, Guam for Operation Arc Light missions over Southeast Asia with the 9th, while the other squadron remained on nuclear alert at Carswell.

The unit continued Arc Light deployments, switching to the B-52D in 1969 until March 1970 when the draw down of the Vietnam War ended forward deployments to Andersen. The squadron continued nuclear alert with the B-52D until 1983, when it re-equipped with B-52Hs, acquiring the aircraft of the 46th Bombardment Squadron at Grand Forks Air Force Base, North Dakota. During the 1980s it conducted B-52 training missions over bombing range sites and supported the wing mission of aerial bombardment.

=== Current era ===
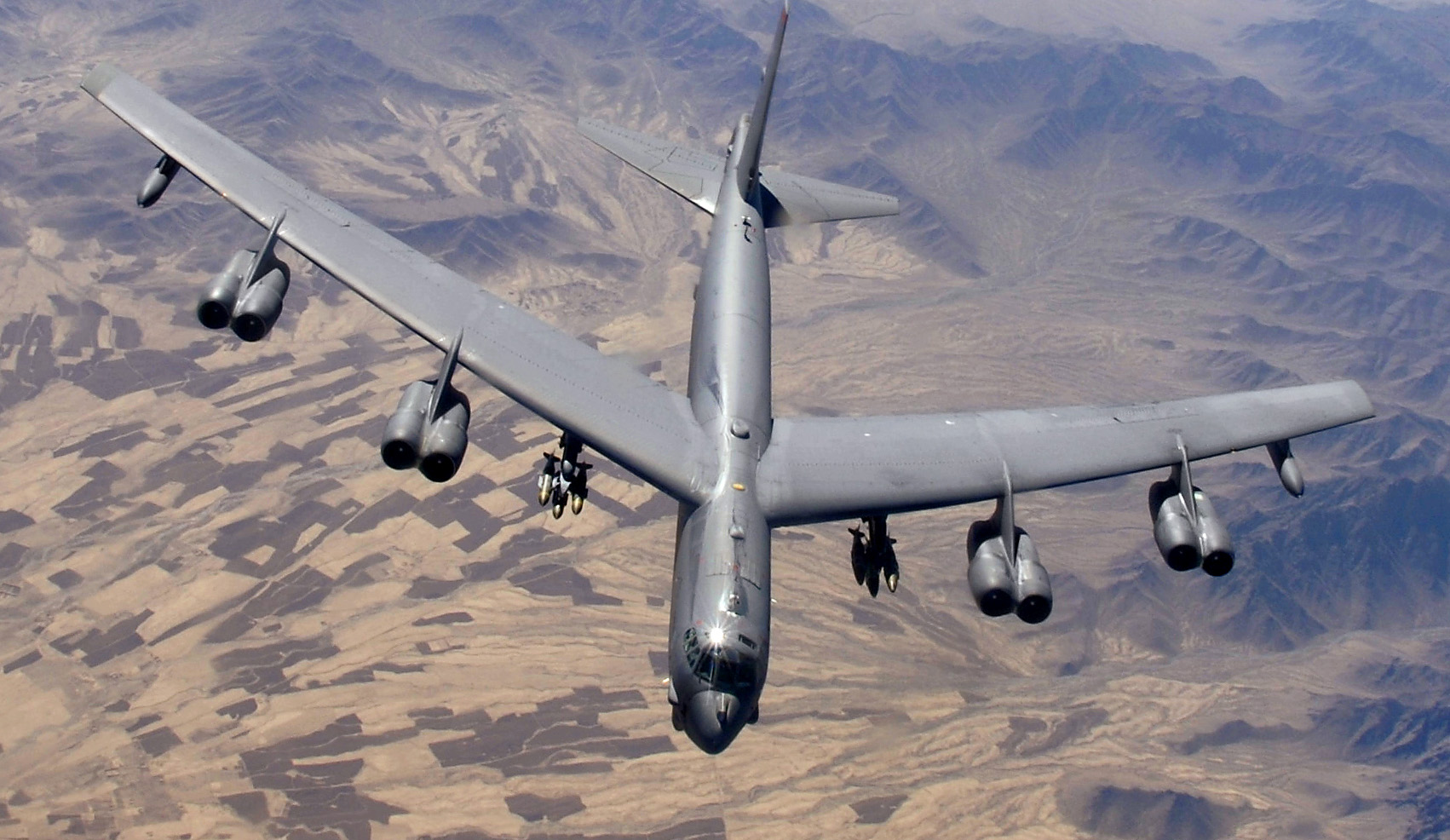
B-52H over Afghanistan as part of Operation Enduring Freedom

The squadron returned to Barksdale in 1992 with the closure of Carswell and became part of the new Air Combat Command. It continued training for global conventional bombardment missions and maintained nuclear operational readiness.

After the September 11 attacks the 20th deployed to the island of Diego Garcia in the Indian Ocean and on 7 October 2001 flew attacks on targets in Afghanistan during Operation Enduring Freedom. In February 2003 it deployed to Guam to deter North Korean aggression.

On 21 July 2008, a squadron B-52 aircraft crashed near Guam during a training mission in support of Guam's Liberation Day festivities. All six crewmembers, three of whom were from the 20th, perished.

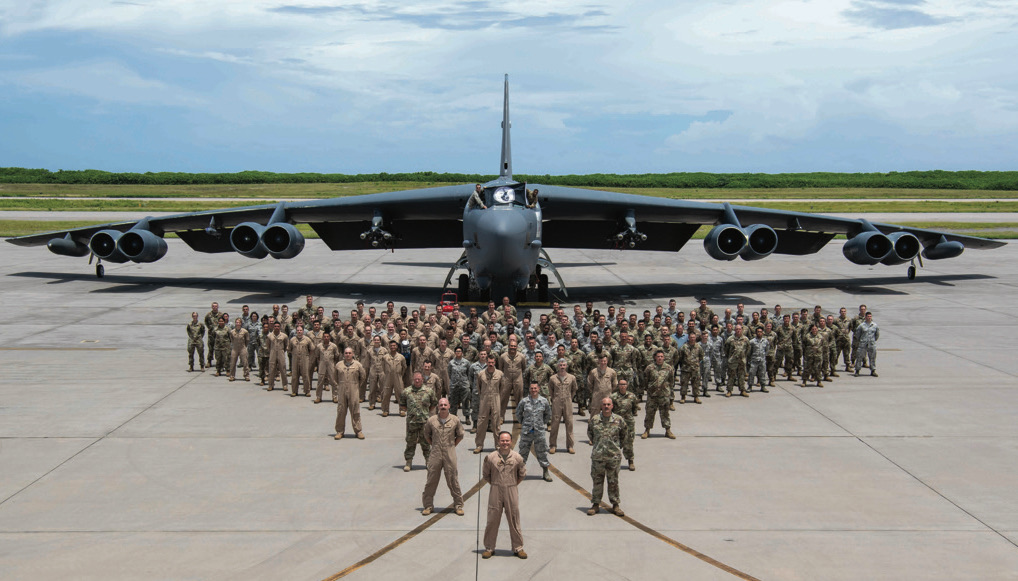
20th Expeditionary Bomb Squadron and Aircraft Maintenance Unit deployed to support operations in the Middle East in 2020.

== Lineage ==
- Organized as the 20th Aero Squadron on 17 May 1917

Redesignated 20th Aero Squadron (Day Bombardment) c. September 1917
Redesignated 20th Squadron (Bombardment) on 14 March 1921
Redesignated 20th Bombardment Squadron on 25 January 1923
Redesignated 20th Bombardment Squadron (Heavy) on 6 December 1939
Redesignated 20th Bombardment Squadron, Heavy on 26 March 1943
Inactivated on 28 February 1946

- Redesignated 20th Bombardment Squadron, Very Heavy on 5 April 1946

Activated on 1 July 1947
Redesignated 20th Bombardment Squadron, Medium on 28 May 1948
Redesignated 20th Bombardment Squadron,, Heavy on 1 April 1963
Redesignated 20th Bomb Squadron on 1 September 1991

=== Assignments ===
- Post Headquarters, Kelly Field, 26 June 1917
- Post Headquarters, Wilbur Wright Field, 29 July 1917
- Aviation Concentration Center, 1 November 1917 – 17 December 1917
- Headquarters, Chief of Air Service, American Expedetionary Force, 31 December 1917 – 23 August 1918 (attached to Royal Flying Corps for training, 7 January 1918 – 20 August 1918)
- Replacement Concentration Center, American Expeditionary Force, 23 August 1918 – 26 August 1918
- 1st Day Bombardment Group, 10 September 1918
- 1st Air Depot, AEF, 17 January 1919
- Unknown, 19 January 1919 – 18 September 1919
- 1st Day Bombardment Group (later 2d Bombardment Group), 18 September 1919 – 28 February 1946
- 2d Bombardment Group, 1 July 1947 (attached to 3d Air Division 6 August 1948 – 16 November 1948, 2d Bombardment Wing after 10 February 1951)
- 2d Bombardment Wing, 16 June 1952
- 7th Bombardment Wing, 25 June 1965
- 7th Operations Group, 1 September 1991
- 2d Operations Group, 18 December 1992 – present

=== Stations ===
World War I

- Camp Kelly, Texas, 26 June 1917
- Wilbur Wright Field, Ohio, 29 July 1917
- Aviation Concentration Center, Garden City, New York, 1 November 1917 – 17 December 1917
- Glasgow, Scotland, 31 December 1918
- Winchester, England
- Romsey RC, Winchester, England, 2 January 1918 – 4 January 1918
- Stamford, England, 7 January 1918

Detachment assigned to Narborough, England, 7 January 1918 – 15 August 1918

- Southampton, England, 20 August 1918
- Le Havre, France, 22 August 1918
- St. Maixent Replacement Barracks, 23 August 1918
- Delouze Aerodrome, France, 26 August 1918
- Amanty Airdrome, France, 7 September 1918
- Maulan Aerodrome, France, 23 September 1918
- Colombey-les-Belles Airdrome, France, 17 January 1919
- Guitres, France, 19 January 1919
- Saint-Denis-de-Pile, France 14 February 1919
- Libourne, France, 27 February 1919 – 20 April 1919

Inter-War period

- Mitchel Field, New York, 2 May 1919
- Ellington Field, Texas, June 1919
- Kelly Field, Texas, 24 September 1919
- Langley Field, Virginia, 30 June 1922

Operated from Mitchel Field, New York, 8 December 1941 – 24 January 1942
World War II

- Ephrata Army Air Base, Washington, 29 October 1942
- Great Falls Army Air Base, Montana, 28 November 1942 – 13 March 1943
- Navarin Airfield, Algeria, 25 April 1943
- Chateau-dun-du-Rhumel Airfield, Algeria, 27 April 1943
- Ain M'lila Airfield, Algeria, 17 June 1943
- Massicault Airfield, Tunisia, 31 July 1943
- Amendola Airfield, Italy, 8 December 1943
- Foggia Airfield, Italy, 10 October 1945 – 28 February 1946

United States Air Force

- Andrews Field, Maryland, 1 July 1947
- Davis-Monthan Field (later Davis-Monthan Air Force Base), Arizona, 24 September 1947

Deployed at RAF Lakenheath, England, 6 August 1948 – 16 November 1948

- Chatham Air Force Base, Georgia, 1 May 1949
- Hunter Air Force Base, Georgia, 29 September 1950

Deployed at RAF Wyton, England, 4 May 1951 – 7 September 1951
Deployed at RAF Upper Heyford, England, 6 September 1952 – 3 December 1952
Deployed at: Sidi Slimane Air Base, French Morocco, 5 August 1954 – 30 September 1954; 3 November 1955 – 7 November 1955; 8 March 1956 – 18 March 1956 and 6 July 1956 – 26 August 1956
Deployed at RAF Lakenheath, England; 10 March 1958 – 18 March 1958

- Barksdale Air Force Base, Louisiana 1 April 1963
- Carswell Air Force Base, Texas, 25 June 1965 – 1992
- Barksdale Air Force Base, Louisiana, 17 December 1992 – present

=== Aircraft ===
World War I

- Curtiss JN-4, 1917
- Standard J-1, 1917
- de Havilland DH-4, 1918

Inter-War period

- de Havilland DH-4, 1919–c. 1927
- Martin MB-2/NBS-1, 1921–1927
- Handley Page 0/400, 1921–Unknown
- Huff-Daland XLB-1, 1927 (service test)
- Keystone XLB-5, 1927 (service test)
- Keystone LB-5, 1927–1929
- Keystone LB-6, 1929–Unknown
- Keystone LB-7, 1929–Unknown
- Keystone B-3, 1931–Unknown
- Keystone B-5, 1931
- Keystone B-6, 1932–1935
- Boeing Y1B-9, 1932–1936
- Curtiss B-2 Condor, 1935–Unknown
- Martin YB-10, 1936–1937
- Martin B-10, 1936–Unknown
- Martin YB-12, 1936–1937
- Boeing YB-17 Fortress, 1937–1941 (service test)
- Douglas B-18 Bolo, 1938–1942
- North American BC-1, 1938–Unknown
- Douglas B-23 Dragon, c. 1939
- Northrop A-17, c. 1939–1940
- Douglas A-20 Havoc, c. 1940–Unknown

World War II

- Lockheed B-34 Lexington, c. 1941–unknown
- North American B-25 Mitchell, 1941–1942
- Boeing B-17 Flying Fortress, 1937–1945

United States Air Force

- Boeing B-29 Superfortress, 1947–1950
- Boeing B-50 Superfortress, 1949–1953
- Boeing B-47E Stratojet, 1954–1963
- Boeing B-52F Stratofortress, 1963–1969
- Boeing B-52D Stratofortress, 1969–1983
- Boeing B-52H Stratofortress, 1983–Present

== See also ==
- Boeing B-17 Flying Fortress Units of the Mediterranean Theater of Operations
- List of American aero squadrons
- List of B-29 Superfortress operators
- List of B-47 units of the United States Air Force
- List of B-52 Units of the United States Air Force
