= Keystone XLB-3 =

Prototype Biplane Bomber

XLB-3
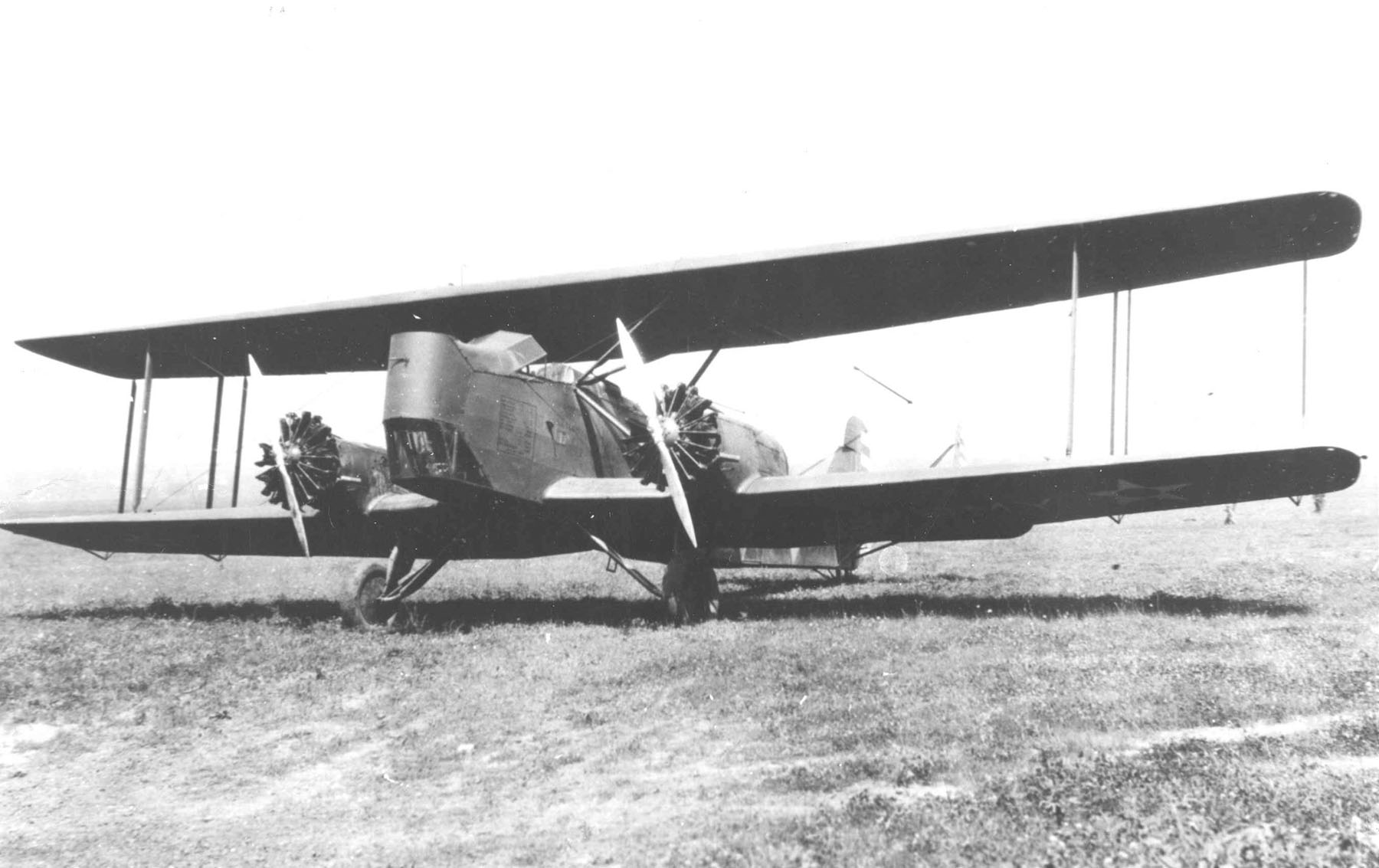
- XLB-3A

General information
- Type: Light bomber
- National origin: United States
- Manufacturer: Keystone Aircraft
- Primary user: United States Army Air Corps
- Number built: 1

History
- First flight: ca. December 1927

The Keystone XLB-3 (originally built under the Huff-Daland name) was a prototype bomber biplane developed in the United States in the late 1920s. It was a twin-engine development of the single-engine LB-1, brought about by a change in policy by the United States Army Air Corps (USAAC).

== Design and development ==
The shift from a nose-mounted engine to engines mounted in nacelles on the lower wing created an opportunity to provide stations for two extra crewmembers: a bombardier and a nose-gunner, bringing the total to five. The LB-1's single tailfin and rudder was augmented by an extra rudder either side of it.

== Operational history ==
A single prototype was constructed, and delivered to the USAAC for evaluation at the end of 1927. Evaluation, however, showed that performance was actually inferior to that of the single-engine LB-1. The decision was taken to change the XLB-3's air-cooled inverted Liberty engines for air-cooled radials, at which point it was redesignated XLB-3A. With performance still unsatisfactory, development was abandoned in favor of a parallel design, the LB-5.

== Variants ==
- XLB-3 – original version with Allison VG-1410 air-cooled inverted V-12 engines (1 built)
- XLB-3A – version with Pratt & Whitney R-1340 radial engines (1 converted from XLB-3)

== Specifications (XLB-3A) ==
Data from Jane's Encyclopedia of Aviation

General characteristics

- Crew: Five – pilot, copilot, bombardier, two gunners
- Length: 45 ft 0 in (13.72 m)
- Wingspan: 67 ft 0 in (20.42 m)
- Height: 16 ft 10 in (5.13 m)
- Wing area: 105.8 sq ft (1,038 m^{2})
- Empty weight: 6,065 lb (2,756 kg)
- Gross weight: 11,682 lb (5,310 kg)
- Powerplant: 2 × Pratt & Whitney R-1340 , 410 hp (305 kW) each

Performance

- Maximum speed: 116 mph (186 km/h, 101 kn)
- Range: 544 mi (870 km, 473 nmi)
- Service ceiling: 11,210 ft (3,400 m)
- Rate of climb: 550 ft/min (2.8 m/s)

Armament

- 2 × trainable .303 in (7.7 mm) Lewis guns in open position in nose
- 2 × trainable .303 in (7.7 mm) Lewis guns in open dorsal position
- 1 × trainable .303 in (7.7 mm) Lewis gun in ventral hatch
- 2,205 lb (1,000 kg) of bombs
