= Hôtel de Ville, Libourne =

Town hall in Libourne, France

Hôtel de Ville
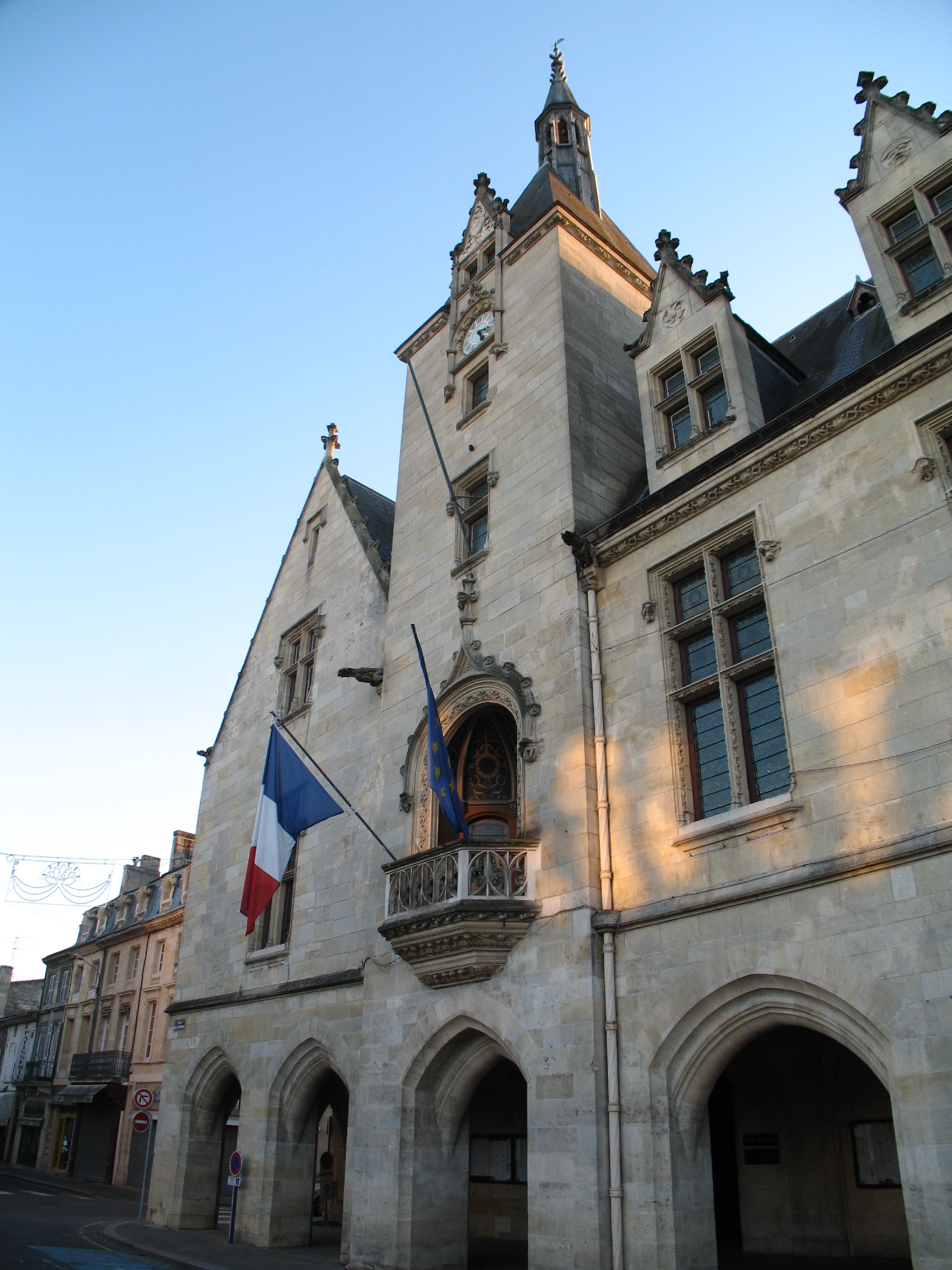
- The main frontage of the Hôtel de Ville in November 2006

General information
- Type: City hall
- Architectural style: Gothic style
- Location: Libourne, France
- Coordinates: 44.9144°N 0.2453°W
- Completed: 1427

Monument historique
- Official name: Hôtel de ville
- Type: Inscrit
- Designated: 1908
- Reference no.: PA00083597

The Hôtel de Ville (French pronunciation: [otɛl də vil], City Hall) is a municipal building in Libourne, Gironde, in southwestern France, standing on Place Abel Surchamp. It was designated a monument historique by the French government in 1908.

== History ==
The building was commissioned by the mayor and aldermen of the town to serve as their meeting place in the early 15th century under the Ancien regime. The site they selected was in the southwestern corner of the market square (now Place Abel Surchamp). Construction progress was impeded by an earthquake which triggered a fire and damaged the roof on 2 February 1427. The new building was completed later that year. It was remodelled to include two towers, one on the main façade and the other on the southeast side, in the first half of the 18th century. Further modifications, designed in the Gothic style and inspired by the style of Emmanuel-Louis-Nicolas Viollet-le-Duc, were completed in the early 20th century.

The design involved a main frontage of five bays facing onto the market square. There was a loggia on the ground floor, formed by six arched openings with archivolts. The left-hand bay, which was gabled, was fenestrated by mullioned and transomed windows on the first and second floors and by a lancet window at attic level and there was a finial at the top of the gable. The second bay contained a four-stage tower: there was an arch in the first stage, a round-headed opening with an ornate balcony in the second stage, a transomed window in the third stage and a plain window in the fourth stage. The tower was surmounted by a clock, a pyramid-shaped roof and an octagonal belfry. The three bays on the right were fenestrated by mullioned and transomed windows on the second floor and by dormer windows with finials at attic level. All the windows featured hood moulds. Internally, the principal room was the Salle du Conseil, which featured fine panelling and a horseshoe-shaped table.

A collection of paintings, assembled at the instigation of the statesman, Élie, duc Decazes, in 1818, was relocated into two rooms on the second floor of the building in 1836. This collection, which later formed the basis of the Musée des Beaux-Arts de Libourne (Museum of fine arts of Libourne), was enhanced when a collection of 52 works, assembled by the collector, Antoine-Victor Bertal, was presented to the museum in 1952.

Works of art in the building include a painting by Benjamin Rolland depicting the Duke and Duchess of Angoulême entering into Bordeaux and declaring his support for King Louis XVIII, an event which marked the start of the Bourbon Restoration in France in March 1814. There is also a painting by Louis-Jean-François Lagrenée depicting a Roman consul refusing gifts, and a statue by François Dumont depicting France embracing the bust of King Louis XV.
