= Emmanuel-Louis-Nicolas Viollet-le-Duc =

French poet (1781–1857)

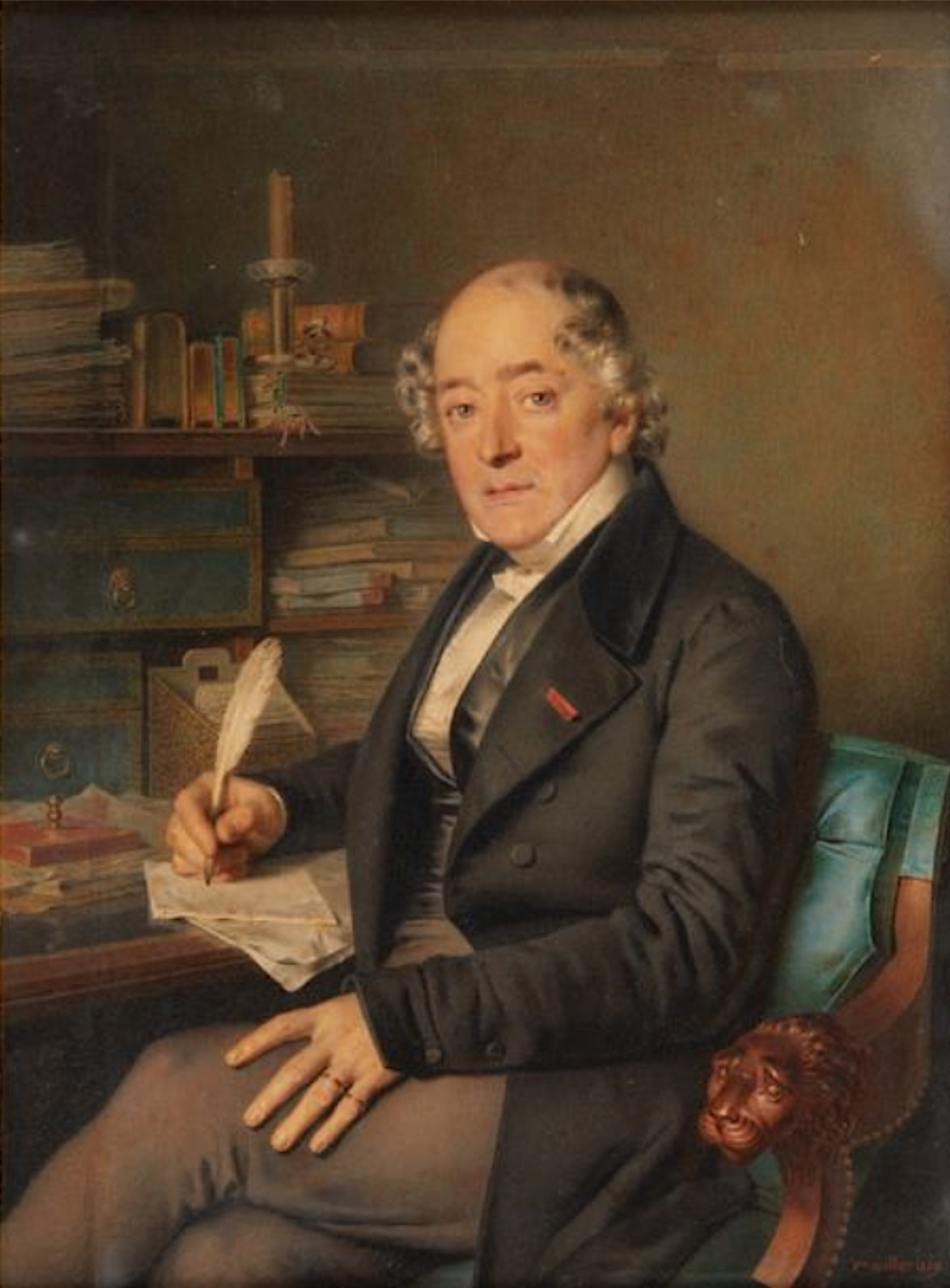
- Portrait of the poet by Frédéric Millet, before 1857, watercolour on gouache (Charenton, Médiathèque de l’Architecture et du Patrimoine).
- Born: 30 May 1781; Paris, France
- Died: 12 July 1857 (aged 76); Fontainebleau, France
- Children: Adolphe Viollet-le-Duc; Eugène Viollet-le-Duc

Emmanuel Viollet-le-Duc (30 May 1781 – 12 July 1857) was a French poet, also notable as father of the painter Adolphe Viollet-le-Duc and the architect Eugene Viollet-le-Duc and brother-in-law of painter and art critic Étienne-Jean Delécluze.

== Life ==
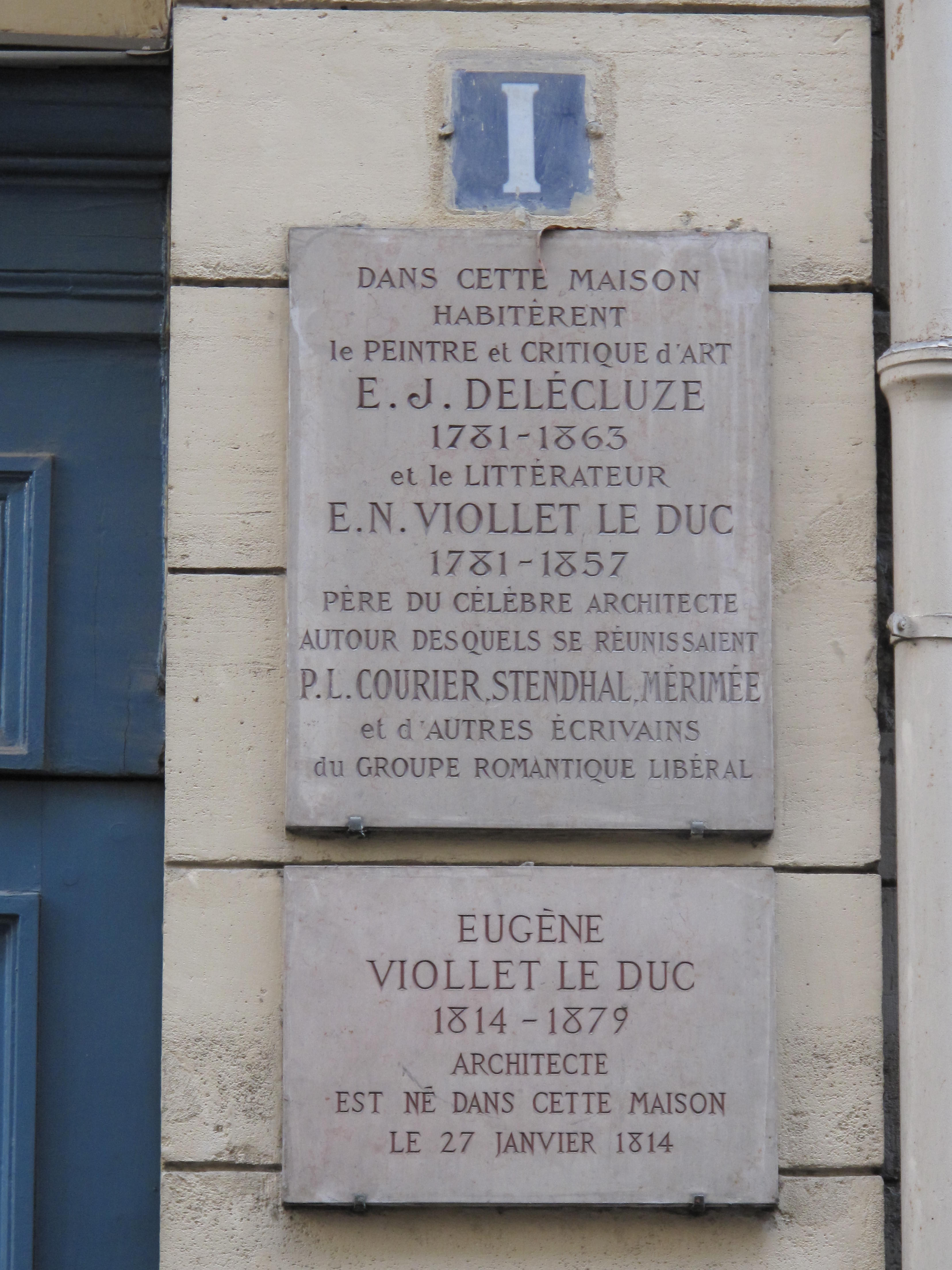
Plaque at 1 rue Chabanais (Paris), where he lived.

Born in Paris, he was the second son of auctioneer Jean Nicolas Viollet-le-Duc (1741-1816) and his wife Adélaïde Boyaval (1750-1799) - his elder brother Sigismond Viollet-le-Duc (1769-1844) joined the army. Forced to interrupt his studies in 1793, he began to self-educate solely by reading poems, especially those of the Renaissance era and earlier. Aged twenty, after studying at a notary, he became office chief at the ministry of war from 1801 to 1809. From 1809 to 1814 he was sub-controller of palace services.

In the meantime he had begun his literary career - in 1809 he published Nouvel Art poétique, a short spiritual poem mocking Jacques Delille and his georgic imitators and renouncing imitation of classical works. It found great success and went through three editions that year. Three years later he returned to that vein with Retour d’Apollon, a satire painting a gloomy picture of French writing at the time and criticising the pseudo-classicists and neo-moderns accused of propagating bad taste.

In 1810, he married Élisabeth Eugénie, the sister of painter and art critic Étienne-Jean Delécluze. From 1815 to 1830, he was an expenses verifier in the Maison du Roi. In 1817, he published l’Art de parvenir, but it gained little attention according to Louis-Gabriel Michaud. In 1809 and 1810, he worked at the periodical Lycée français, which ultimately totalled five volumes. In 1820, he edited a five-volume edition of the works of Jean de Rotrou with historical and literary notes. In 1821 he also contributed notes to a four-volume edition of the works of Nicolas Boileau. In 1822 he contributed to a republication of the works of Mathurin Régnier with an introduction on the history of satire in France.

During the Trois Glorieuses he supported Louis Philippe I, who made him governor of the Tuileries, then curator of royal residences and households in the Intendance générale de la liste civile from 1832 to 1848, focussed on the residences of the new king's sister Adélaïde d'Orléans but holding onto the post after her death and only being dismissed from it on the 1848 Revolution.

In 1829 and 1830 he contributed two lengthy summaries to the Encyclopédie portative, one on poetics and versifying and another on theatre. He later also contributed articles to the Dictionnaire de la conversation. In 1843 he published his most important work, la Bibliothèque poétique, an anthology of French poetry from the 13th century until his day which he had researched for thirty years, with each work having citations and commentary. In 1847 he completed that work with a second volume covering non-professional poets, prose short stories and jokes.

During his lifetime he collected a large private library but on his dismissal in 148 he was expelled from the neighbourhood where he stored his books - indeed, some sources refer to him as "librarian at the Tuileries Palace", but the library he oversaw was his own and that Palace merely stored it. Discouraged, he decided to put some of his library up for auction, with the auction catalogue published in 1849.

Fellow bibliophile and book collector Pierre Jannet, who worked as a publisher, had published (with competition from Ternaux-Compans) Bibliothèque elzévirienne, a series of works chosen by him. He pulled Viollet-le-Duc out of his depression by proposing to create la Bibliothèque elzévirienne and to publish Ancien théâtre français in ten volumes - the poet contributed Six mois de la vie d’un jeune homme (1797), a kind of autobiographical novel, to the former and took an active part in publishing the latter. He died in 1857 at Fontainebleau.

== Works ==
=== Poems ===
- Nouvel Art poétique: poëme en un chant. Paris. 1809..
- Rome et le Tibre, prosopopée à l’occasion de la naissance du roi de Rome, 1811.
- Le Retour d'Apollon: poëme satirique. Paris: Janet et Cotelle. 1812..
- Philippiques [3] à Napoléon, 1815.
- L'Art de parvenir - poëme en un chant. Paris. 1817..
- La Métroxylotechnie: poème en 1 chant. Paris. 1820.
- Notice nécrologique sur P.-L. Courier, 1825.
- Épitre à M. Sainte-Beuve, 1837.
- Au Roi, April 1840.
- Six mois de la vie d'un jeune homme (1797). Paris: P. Jannet. 1853.

=== Essays ===
- Précis d'un traité de poétique et de versification: contenant des considérations sur la poésie en genéral, son origine, son but, ses moyens, ses formes, caractères et modifications à diverses époques les règles de la composition et du style poétique selon les systèmes des divers poètes ; celles de la versification et de tous les diférens genres de poésies, anciens et actuels ; précédé d'une introduction historique, et suivi d'une biographie, d'une bibliographie et d'un vocabulaire analytique (in French). Paris: Bachelier. 1829..
- Précis de dramatique ou De l'art de composer et exécuter les pièces de théâtre: précédé d'une introduction historique, et terminé par une biographie, une bibliographie et un vocabulaire analytique (in French). Paris: Mairet & Fournier. 1842 [1830]..
- Ancien théatre françois ou Collection des ouvrages dramatiques les plus remarquables depuis les mystères jusqu'à Corneille: publié avec des notes et éclaircissements par Viollet le Duc, [A. de Montaiglon, P. Jannet]. Paris. 1854..

=== Critical editions ===
- Bibliographie des chansons, fabliaux, contes en vers et en prose…, 1859.
- Charles Beys (1856). La Comédie de chansons. Paris..
- L. C. Discret (d), Alizon : comédie, Paris, 1856.
- Œuvres de Boileau Despréaux, with reviewed, corrected and expanded commentaries, 1821 ; rééd. 1823.
- Molière (1819). Deux pièces inédites de J.-B.-P. Molière. Paris: Th. Desoer..
- Mathurin Régnier (1822) [1813]. Œuvres de Mathurin Régnier: avec les commentaires [de Brossette], revus, corrigés et augmentés ; précédées de l'Histoire de la satire en France, pour servir de discours préliminaire. Paris: Th. Desoer..
