= Jean-Marie Poumeyrol =

French artist

Jean-Marie Poumeyrol (born at Libourne on June 8, 1946) is a French artist.

Much of his early work consisted of erotica and hallucinogenic art, but as his art has developed he has shown a great interest in landscapes as well. He is an exponent of the fantastic realism movement.
