= Charles Beys =

French poet and playwright (died 1659)

Charles Beys (Note: Some writers give his surname as 'de Beys', but no primary sources support this - Cornelis Gieliszoon Beys (1497-1559) was a Dutchman who settled in France but none of his many descendants were ever promoted to the nobility and Charles himself always simply signed himself 'Beys'. Even so, a "lord of Beys" is mention in the extract of privilege from Jaloux sans sujet.) (Note: If we trust the metre of the neighbouring pieces from his Œuvres poétiques, his surname was pronounced [beïs] or [baïs], with two syllables.) (died 26 September 1659) was a French poet and playwright.

He wrote of himself that "did not love work or glory too much", whilst other contemporaries stated his poetry writing was "commonly easy, natural, even exact". He is notable as the first French playwright to show an insane asylum on stage.

== Life ==
He was baptised on 21 January 1610 at the église Saint-Benoît-le-Bétourné in Paris.

== Works ==
- Le Jaloux sans sujet, tragi-comedie de Beys, Paris, 1636.
- L'Hospital des fous, tragi-comedie de Beys, Paris, 1636. Réédition Toussaint Quinet, «Sur l'imprimé», Paris, 1638, et sous le titre L'Ospital (sic) des fous, Paris, 1639.
- Celine, ou Les Freres rivaux. Tragi-comédie de Beys, Paris, Toussaint Quinet, 1637. Réédition, Paris, 1640, sous le titre Les Freres rivaux.
- Les Triomphes de Louis le Juste, XIII. du nom, Roy de France et de Navarre, Paris, Antoine Estienne, 1649.
- Les Œuvres poetiques de Beys, Paris, Toussaint Quinet, 1651.
- Stances sur le depart de Monseigneur le premier President, garde des Seaux (sic) de France, Paris, Antoine Estienne, 1652.
- Les Illustres fous, comedie de Beys, Paris, Olivier de Varennes, 1653 (nouvelle version de L'Hospital des fous). Rééd : Les Illustres Fous of Charles de Beys, ed. by Merle I. Protzman, Baltimore, Johns Hopkins Press, 1942.
- Le Triomphe de l'Amour sur les Bergers et les Bergeres, dédié au Roy, mis en musique par De la Guerre, organiste de Sa Majesté en sa Saincte Chapelle du Palais à Paris, Paris, Charles Chenault, 1654.
- Les Plaisirs troublez. Mascarade. Dansée devant le Roy par Monsieur le Duc de Guise. Paris, Robert Ballard, 1657.

=== Uncertain attribution ===
- Le Gouvernement present, ou Eloge de son Eminence. Satyre ou la Miliade, sans lieu ni date [1636].

From the 18th century onwards bibliographers attributed two comedies and a collection of burlesque verses to Beys despite no documents from Beys' own time stating he wrote them :

- L'Amant liberal. Tragi-comedie, Paris, Toussaint Quinet,1637 · .
- La Comedie de chansons, Paris, Toussaint Quinet, 1640 · .
- Les Odes d'Horace en vers burlesques, Paris, Toussaint Quinet, 1653 [achevé d'imprimer daté du 17 avril 1652]. La même édition chez Thomas Jolly, sous la date de 1652, et à Leyde (Hollande), chez Jean Sambix, sous la date de 1653. Réédition par André Lebois, Avignon, Édouard Aubanel, 1963.

== Bibliography ==
- (in French) Abbé Claude-Pierre Goujet, Bibliothèque françoise ou Histoire de la litterature françoise : dans laquelle on montre l'utilité que l'on peut retirer des livres publiés en françois depuis l'origine de l'imprimerie, tome XVI, p. 293-302.
- (in French) Comte de Puymaigre, «Un poète apologiste de Louis XIII», Revue des questions historiques, nouvelle série, tome XX, Paris, 1898, p. 204-223.
- (in French) Eduard Stemplinger, «Ch. de Beys: Odes d'Horace en vers burlesques», Zeitschrift für französische Sprache und Literatur, 27, 1904, p. 266-277.
- (in French) Henri Quittard, «La première comédie française en musique», Bulletin français de la S.I.M. (Société internationale de musique), Paris, 15 avril 1908, p. 377-396.
- (in French) Jean Marmier, Horace en France au dix-septième siècle, Paris, P.U.F., 1962, p. 237-242 et 399-401.
- (in French) René Pintard, «Charles Beys, gai poète et libertin», Revue d'histoire littéraire de la France, juillet-septembre 1964, p. 451-453.
- (in French) André Lebois, «Mais qui était Charles Beys?», XVIIe siècle, 1966, p. 74-100.
- (in French) André Lebois, «Le Latin: Horace rapproché par Charles Beys, 1652», Marseille, first trimester 1972 (Colloque de Marseille, «Le 17th century et l'éducation», Supplément au numéro 88), p. 169-173.
- (in French) Timothée J. Reiss, «Un théâtre de l'homme dans - ou devant? - le monde: Les Illustres fous (Beys)», in Baroque, No. 6, 1973, Actes des journées internationales d'étude du Baroque.
- (in Italian) Valeria Pompejano Natoli, «Il tema della follia ne L'Hospital des fous di Charles Beys», in Il Teatro al Tempo di Luigi XIII, Quaderni del Seicento Francese, I, Paris, Nizet, 1974, p. 137-150.
- Marie-France Hilgar, «La folie dans le théâtre du XVII^{e} siècle en France», Romance Notes, n° 16, Winter 1975, p. 383-389.
- (in French) Gérard Defaux, «Sagesse et folie d’Érasme à Molière», Modern Language Notes 91, 1976, n° 4, p. 655-671.
- (in French) Georges Forestier, Le Théâtre dans le théâtre sur la scène française au XVIIe siècle. Genève, Droz, 1981.
- (in French) G.J. Mallison, «L'Hospital des fous of Charles Beys: the Madman and the Actor», in French Studies, vol. XXXVI, 1982, p. 12-25.
- (in French) Stéphane Clerget, Aspects de la folie dans le théâtre de Charles Beys (1610-1659), thèse établie sous la direction de Jean Adès, Université de Paris VII, 1991.
- Ziad Elmarsafy, «Actors, Lovers and Madmen: Theatricality and Identity in Charles Beys’ Les Illustres Fous», in Papers on French Seventeenth-Century Literature, 40 (1994), p. 81–94.
- (in Italian) Valeria Pompejano Natoli, «La follia ‘ospitalizzata’. Dal trattato di Tommaso Garzoni al teatro di Charles Beys», Studi di Letteratura francese (Biblioteca dell’Archivum Romanicum) Serie I, Storia Lett., 1992, 19 (249), p. 229-245.
- Paul Scott, «Subversive revisions in the work of Charles de Beys», French Studies, vol. LX, No. 2, Oxford University Press, 2006, p. 177-190.
- (in French) Thomas Leconte, «La Comédie de chansons (1640) et son répertoire d'airs», in Poésie, musique et société: l'air de cour en France au XVIIe siècle (Georgie Durosoir éd.), Sprimont (Belgique), Pierre Mardaga éditeur, 2006, p. 291-316.
- (in French) Hélène Tropé, «Variations dramatiques espagnoles et françaises sur le thème de l'Hôpital des fous aux XVIe et XVIIe siècles: de Lope de Vega à Charles Beys», Bulletin hispanique, tome 109, No. 1, 2007, p. 97-135.
- (in French) Jean Leclerc, «Les Odes d’Horace en vers burlesques de Charles Beys, ou les avatars d’un épicurisme bachique, G. Hodgson (ed.), «Libertinism and Literature in 17th-century France», Biblio 17. Papers on French Seventeenth Century Literature, Tübingen, Verlag, 2009, p. 159-174.
- (in French) Paul Scott (éd.), Le Gouvernement présent, ou éloge de son Eminence, satyre ou la Miliade, MHRA (Modern Humanities Research Association) Critical Texts, vol. 14, Londres, 2010.
- (in French) Françoise Poulet, «L’asile dans le théâtre : la folie comme miroir tendu au spectateur dans Les illustres fous de Charles Beys (1653)», Métathéâtre, théâtre dans le théâtre et la folie, 2010, p. 65-88.
- (in French) Françoise Poulet, «Fou enfermé ou fou en liberté? Étude comparée des "pièces d'asile" sur la scène européenne du premier XVIIe siècle (Espagne, Angleterre, France)», Shakespeare en devenir - Les Cahiers de La Licorne, n° 3, 2009. Publié en ligne le 28 janvier 2010.
- (in French) Guy Thuillier, «Une satire contre Richelieu: la Miliade (1636)», Revue administrative, 2012, vol. 65, n° 390, p. 584-590.
- (in French) Françoise Poulet, «Dans les interstices du pouvoir, entre centre et excentricité: le poète et dramaturge Charles Beys (1610-1659)», in Ombres et pénombres de la République des Lettres. Marges, hétérodoxie, clandestinité (XVe – XVIIIe siècles) (Actes du 10th colloque Jeunes chercheurs du Cercle Interuniversitaire d’Étude sur la République des Lettres (CIERL)). Paris, Hermann, 2014.

== External links (in French) ==
- Céline ou Les Frères rivaux on Théâtre classique.
- Les Illustres fous on Gallica.
- La Comédie de chansons on Gallica.
