= Georges Charles Marius Engerrand =

Georges Charles Marius Engerrand (11 August 1877, Libourne, France – 2 September 1961, Mexico City) was a French-Mexican-American geologist and archaeologist.

He studied at the University of Bordeaux, earning licentiates in geology (1897) and botany (1898). As a university student, he was a Dreyfusard in the controversy over the false conviction of Captain Alfred Dreyfus. Consequently, under the sponsorship of French geographer and anarchist Élisée Reclus, after graduation he emigrated to Belgium to avoid service in the French military. In Belgium, he taught, did field research, and published on geological and archaeological subjects, including the controversial identification of “eoliths,” or possible primitive stone tools dating well back into the Pleistocene.

In 1907, Engerrand moved to Mexico, where he continued his work in both archaeology and geology and became a Mexican citizen in 1908. He was a professor of prehistory at the National Museum of Anthropology and a successor to Franz Boas as director the Escuela Internacional de Arqueología e Historia. Among many contributions, he played a key role in developing a prehistoric stratigraphic chronology for the Valley of Mexico and in investigating rock art in northwestern Baja California.

However, the political climate during the Mexican Revolution was unfavorable, and in 1917 Engerrand again emigrated to the United States. After teaching briefly in Mississippi, he served as a member of the University of Texas’s anthropology department from 1920 until 1961, producing an ethnographic study of the German immigrant community of Wends in Texas.
