= Gérard Defaux =

French-American university teacher (1937–2004)

Gérard Defaux (9 May 1937 – 31 December 2004) was a French American writer.

He was born in Paris on 9 May 1937, and attended the Lycée Henri-IV as well as the École normale supérieure de Saint-Cloud. Defaux completed a doctoral dissertation on the work of François Rabelais at the University of Paris, supervised by Verdun-Louis Saulnier. Defaux later took the pseudonym Panurge, after a character in Rabelais' Gargantua and Pantagruel. Defaux began teaching at Trent University in 1967, leaving for Bryn Mawr College in 1969. Defaux joined the Yale University faculty in 1979. His association with Johns Hopkins University started in 1981. That same year, Defaux received a Guggenheim Fellowship. The French government awarded Defaux an Ordre des Palmes Académiques, followed by knighthood of the Ordre des Arts et des Lettres in 1997. Defaux was diagnosed with a brain tumor in February 2004, and died 31 December 2004, in a Paris hospital at the age of 67.
