= Libourne =

- Subprefecture and commune
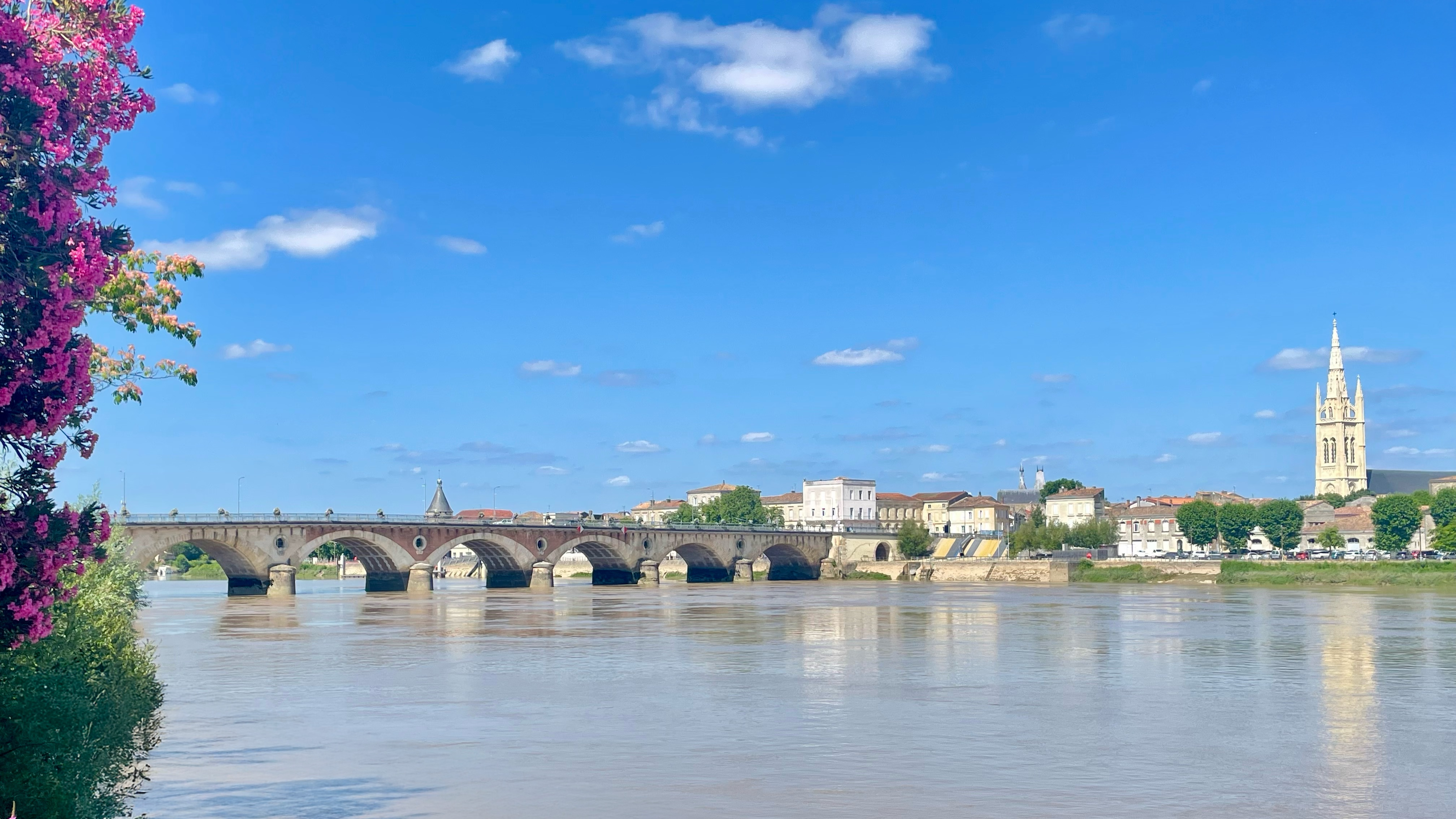
- Bridge over the Dordogne river

- Coat of arms
- Location of Libourne
- Location within France Location within Nouvelle-Aquitaine
- Coordinates: 44°55′N 0°14′W
- Country: France
- Region: Nouvelle-Aquitaine
- Department: Gironde
- Arrondissement: Libourne
- Canton: Le Libournais-Fronsadais
- Intercommunality: CA Libournais

Government
  - Mayor (2020–2026): Philippe Buisson (PS)
- Area^{1}: 20.63 km^{2} (7.97 sq mi)
- Elevation: 15 m (49 ft)
- Highest elevation: 28 m (92 ft)
- Lowest elevation: 2 m (6.6 ft)
- Population (2023): 25,036
  - Density: 1,214/km^{2} (3,143/sq mi)
- Time zone: UTC+01:00 (CET)
  - Summer (DST): UTC+02:00 (CEST)
- INSEE/Postal code: 33243 /33500
- ^{1} French Land Register data, which excludes lakes, ponds, glaciers > 1 km^{2} (0.386 sq mi or 247 acres) and river estuaries.

Libourne (French pronunciation: [libuʁn]; Gascon: Liborna [liˈbuɾnɔ]) is a commune in the Gironde department in Nouvelle-Aquitaine in southwestern France. It is a sub-prefecture of the department.

It is the wine-making capital of northern Gironde and lies near Saint-Émilion and Pomerol.

== History ==
Like other sites at the confluence of important rivers, that of Libourne was appropriated at an early period. Under the Romans a colonia stood rather more than a mile to the south of the present Libourne; it was destroyed during the troubles of the 5th century. Resuscitated by Charlemagne, it was rebuilt in 1269, as Leybornia, and was founded as a bastide by Roger de Leybourne (of Leybourne, Kent), an English seneschal of Gascony, under the authority of King Edward I of England. It suffered considerably in the struggles of the French and English for the possession of Gironde in the Hundred Years' War, and joined France in the 15th century.

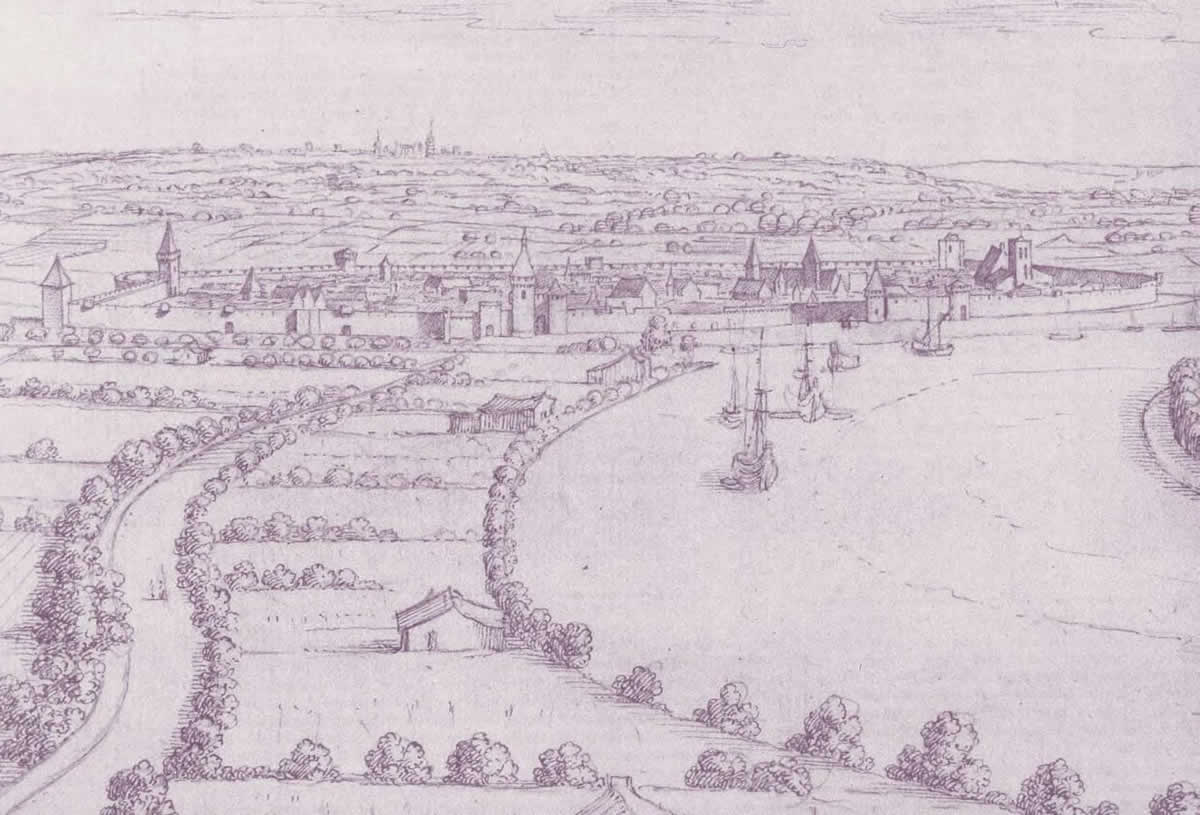
Libourne, view from the mound of Fronsac, pen drawing by Herman Van der Hem, around 1640

In 1787 the parlement of Bordeaux was exiled to Libourne amid political crises.

In December 1854 John Stuart Mill passed through Libourne, remarking "I stopped at Libourne as I intended & had a walk about it this morning quite the best thing there is the bridge of the Dordogne, the view from which is really fine".

== Sights ==
The Gothic church, restored in the 19th century, has a stone spire 71 m (232 ft) high. On the quay there is a machicolated clock-tower which is a survival of the defensive walls of the 14th century.

The Hôtel de Ville was completed in 1427.

There is also a statue of Élie, duc Decazes, who was born in the region.

== Geography ==
Libourne is located at the confluence of the Isle and Dordogne rivers. Libourne station has rail connections to Bordeaux, Bergerac, Angoulême, Périgueux, Limoges, Brive-la-Gaillarde and Sarlat-la-Canéda.

Climate data for Libourne (Saint-Émilion) (1995–2020 normals, extremes 1995–present)
Month	Jan	Feb	Mar	Apr	May	Jun	Jul	Aug	Sep	Oct	Nov	Dec	Year
Record high °C (°F)	18.6 (65.5)	24.7 (76.5)	26.3 (79.3)	30.8 (87.4)	35.5 (95.9)	39.7 (103.5)	40.9 (105.6)	41.3 (106.3)	37.9 (100.2)	33.0 (91.4)	25.2 (77.4)	19.7 (67.5)	41.3 (106.3)
Mean daily maximum °C (°F)	9.9 (49.8)	11.6 (52.9)	15.4 (59.7)	18.6 (65.5)	22.2 (72.0)	25.9 (78.6)	27.8 (82.0)	28.0 (82.4)	24.7 (76.5)	20.1 (68.2)	13.8 (56.8)	10.5 (50.9)	19.0 (66.2)
Daily mean °C (°F)	6.6 (43.9)	7.3 (45.1)	10.3 (50.5)	13.1 (55.6)	16.6 (61.9)	19.8 (67.6)	21.5 (70.7)	21.5 (70.7)	18.2 (64.8)	14.9 (58.8)	9.8 (49.6)	7.1 (44.8)	13.9 (57.0)
Mean daily minimum °C (°F)	3.3 (37.9)	3.1 (37.6)	5.2 (41.4)	7.6 (45.7)	11.0 (51.8)	13.8 (56.8)	15.1 (59.2)	14.9 (58.8)	11.8 (53.2)	9.6 (49.3)	5.8 (42.4)	3.6 (38.5)	8.7 (47.7)
Record low °C (°F)	−8.3 (17.1)	−12.0 (10.4)	−9.0 (15.8)	−1.8 (28.8)	2.2 (36.0)	5.6 (42.1)	7.1 (44.8)	6.2 (43.2)	2.9 (37.2)	−5.6 (21.9)	−8.0 (17.6)	−9.7 (14.5)	−12.0 (10.4)
Average precipitation mm (inches)	78.2 (3.08)	61.5 (2.42)	58.0 (2.28)	72.4 (2.85)	68.1 (2.68)	58.2 (2.29)	47.7 (1.88)	55.2 (2.17)	62.0 (2.44)	61.4 (2.42)	91.4 (3.60)	84.0 (3.31)	798.1 (31.42)
Average precipitation days (≥ 1.0 mm)	12.5	10.4	10.6	11.2	9.9	8.0	7.3	7.7	8.1	9.8	13.2	12.5	121.3
Source: Meteociel

== Population ==
Historical population

Year	Pop.	±% p.a.
1793	9,100	—
1800	8,076	−1.69%
1806	8,293	+0.44%
1821	8,787	+0.39%
1831	9,838	+1.14%
1836	9,714	−0.25%
1841	9,814	+0.21%
1846	11,813	+3.78%
1851	12,650	+1.38%
1856	13,290	+0.99%
1861	13,565	+0.41%
1866	14,639	+1.54%
1872	14,960	+0.36%
1876	15,231	+0.45%
1881	15,981	+0.97%
1886	16,736	+0.93%
1891	17,867	+1.32%
1896	18,016	+0.17%
1901	19,175	+1.25%

Year	Pop.	±% p.a.
1906	19,323	+0.15%
1911	20,085	+0.78%
1921	18,083	−1.04%
1926	18,453	+0.41%
1931	19,103	+0.69%
1936	19,491	+0.40%
1946	20,166	+0.34%
1954	19,474	−0.44%
1962	19,834	+0.23%
1968	22,123	+1.84%
1975	21,651	−0.31%
1982	22,119	+0.31%
1990	21,012	−0.64%
1999	21,761	+0.39%
2007	23,471	+0.95%
2012	23,736	+0.22%
2017	24,845	+0.92%
2023	25,036	+0.13%

Source: EHESS and INSEE (1968-2023)

== Gallery ==
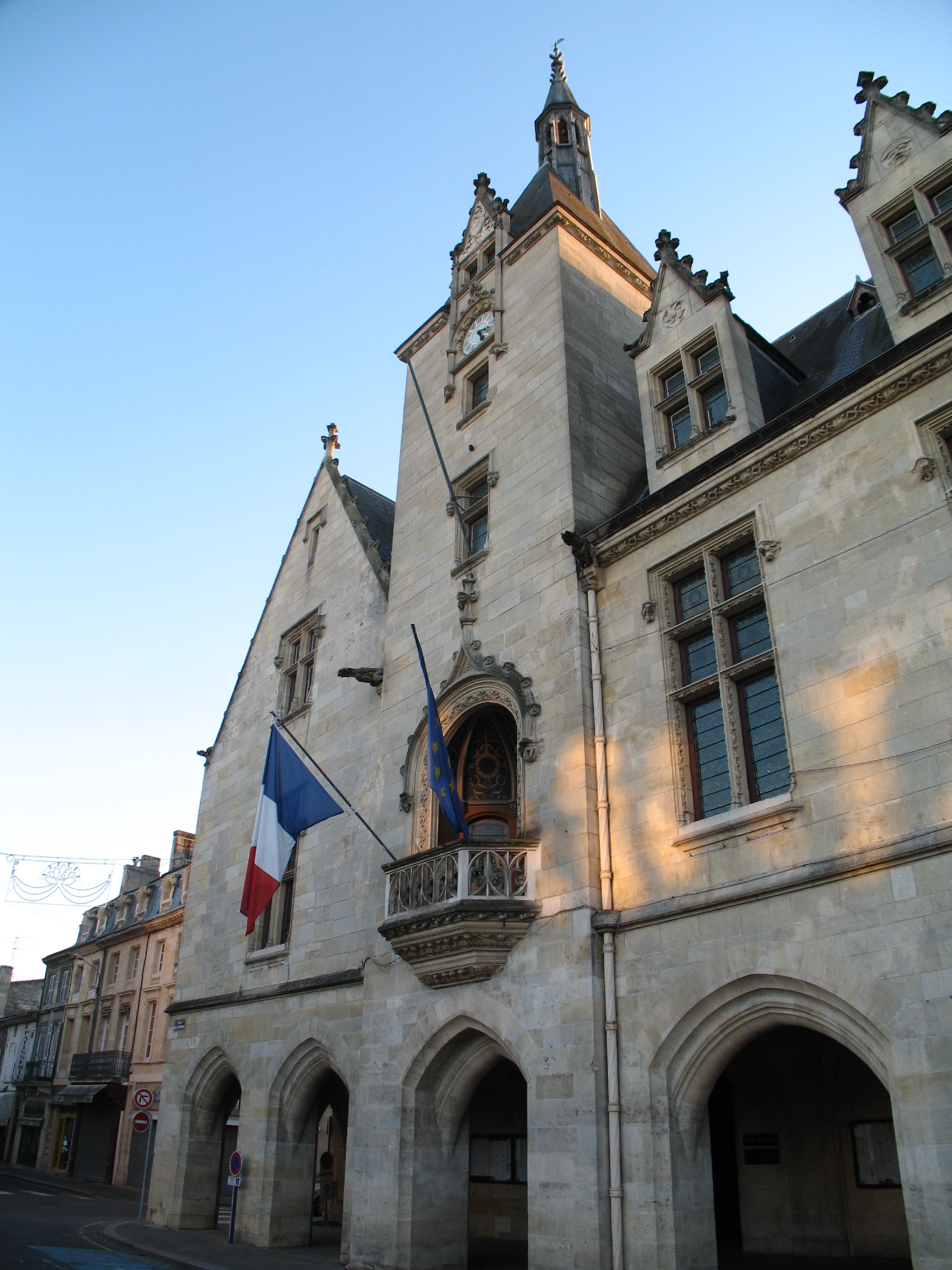
The Hôtel de Ville

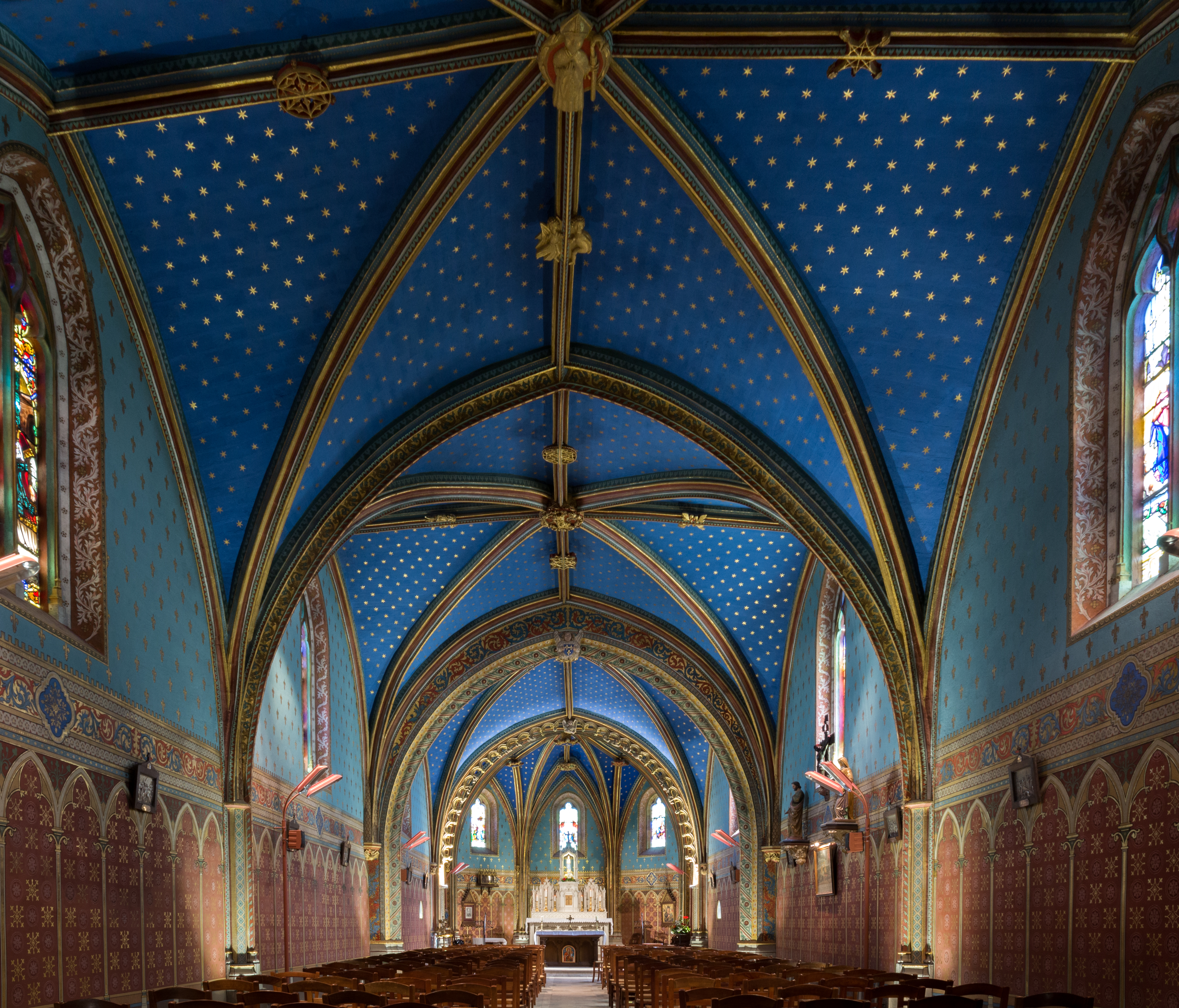
Nave of the Chapelle de Condat

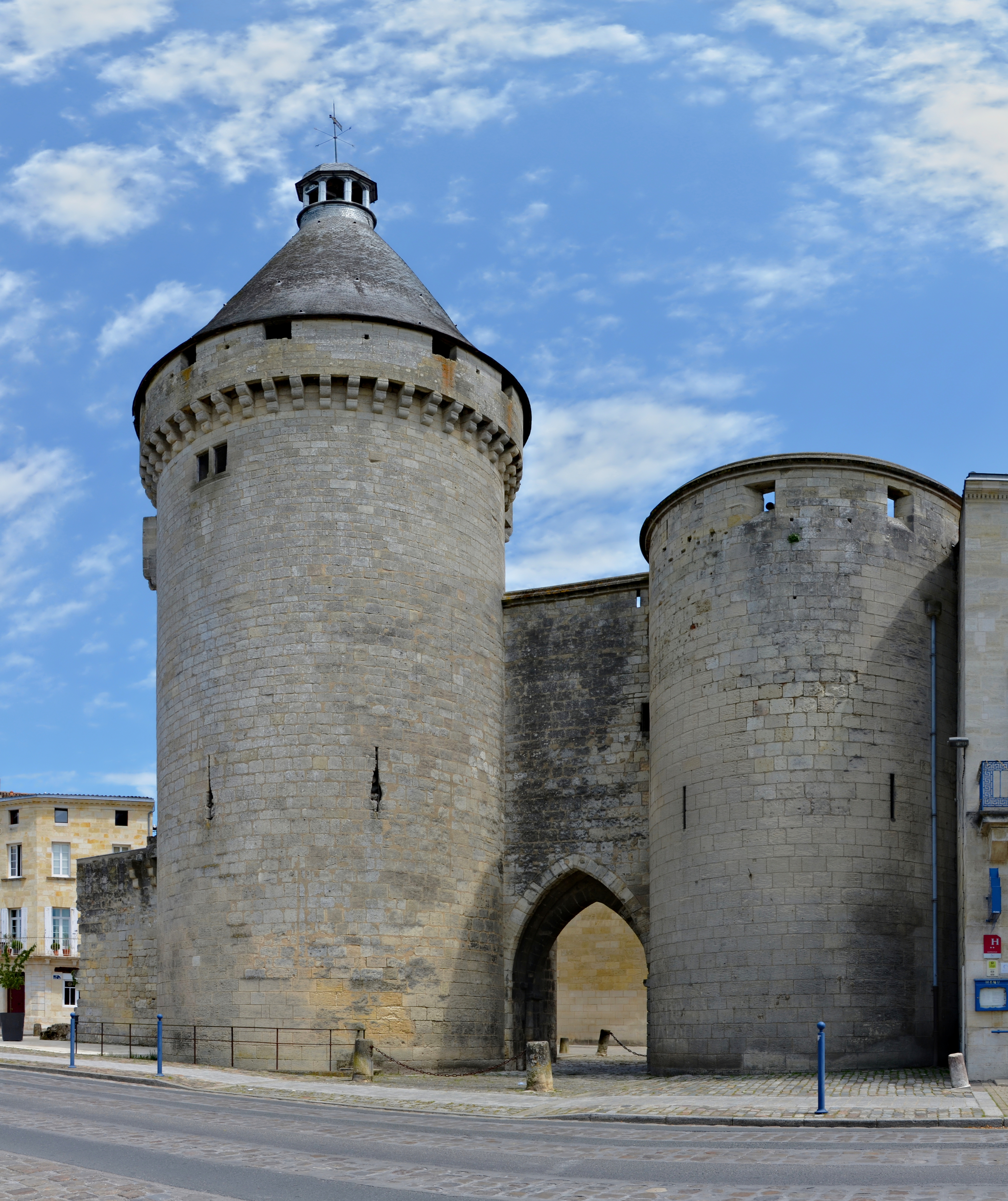
Gate of the Port

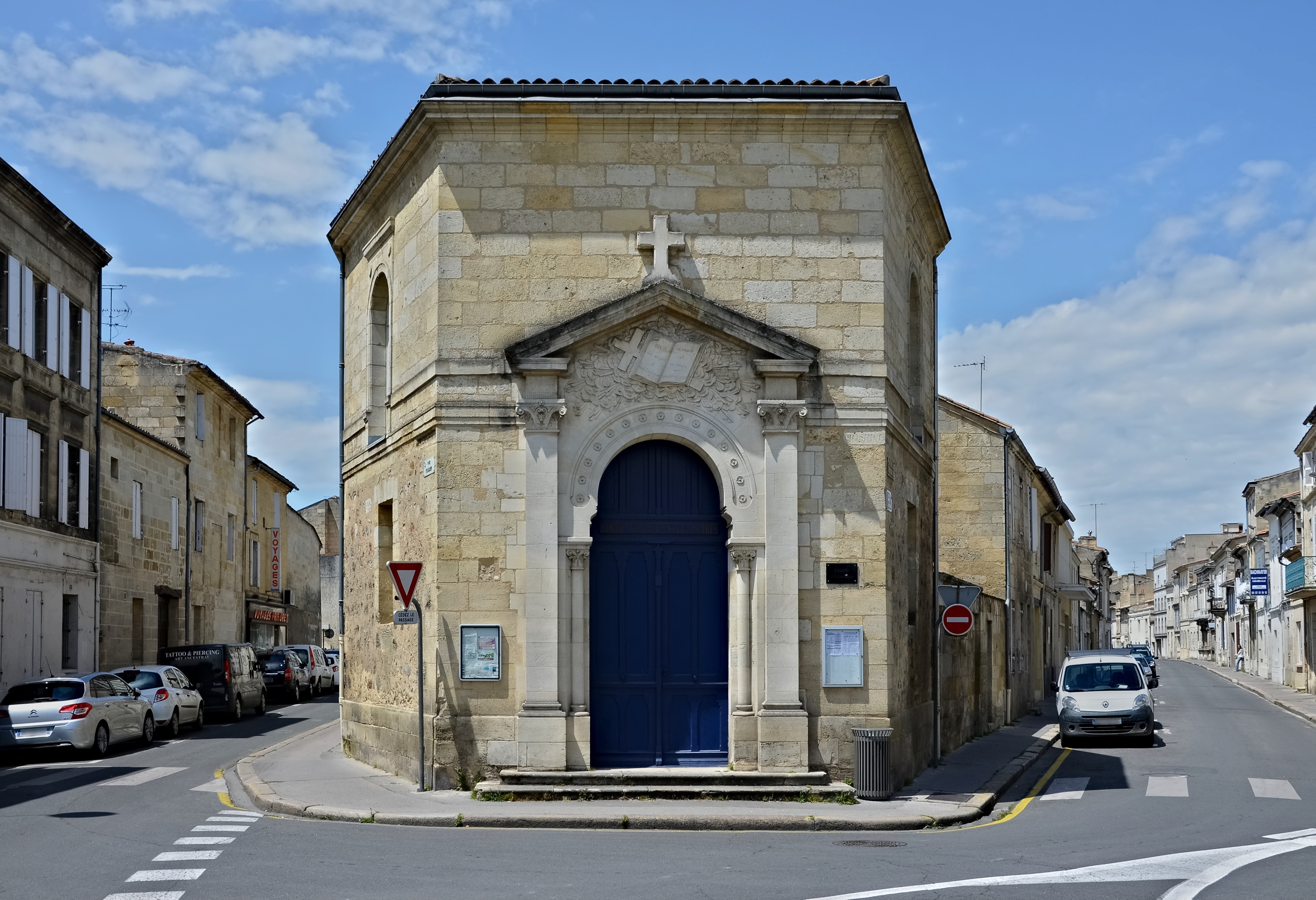
Protestant temple

== Notable people ==
- Eugène Atget (1857–1927), French photographer, "Creator and Purveyor of a Collection of Photographic Views of Old France"
- Georges Charles Marius Engerrand (1877–1961), geologist and archaeologist
- Florian Latorre (born 1997), racing driver
- Louis Le Provost de Launay (1850–1912), French deputy and senator
- Jean-Marie Londeix (1932–2025), French saxophonist
- Jean Marcadé (1920–2012), French Hellenist and historian
- Jean-Marie Poumeyrol (born 1946), artist

== See also ==
- Hull town walls, the town of Hull, also established under Edward I, is said to have been similar in design to the Bastides, in particular Libourne
- Communes of the Gironde department
- Keynsham, twinned with Libourne
