= Keystone LB-5 =

1927 bomber aircraft series by Keystone/Huff-Daland

LB-5
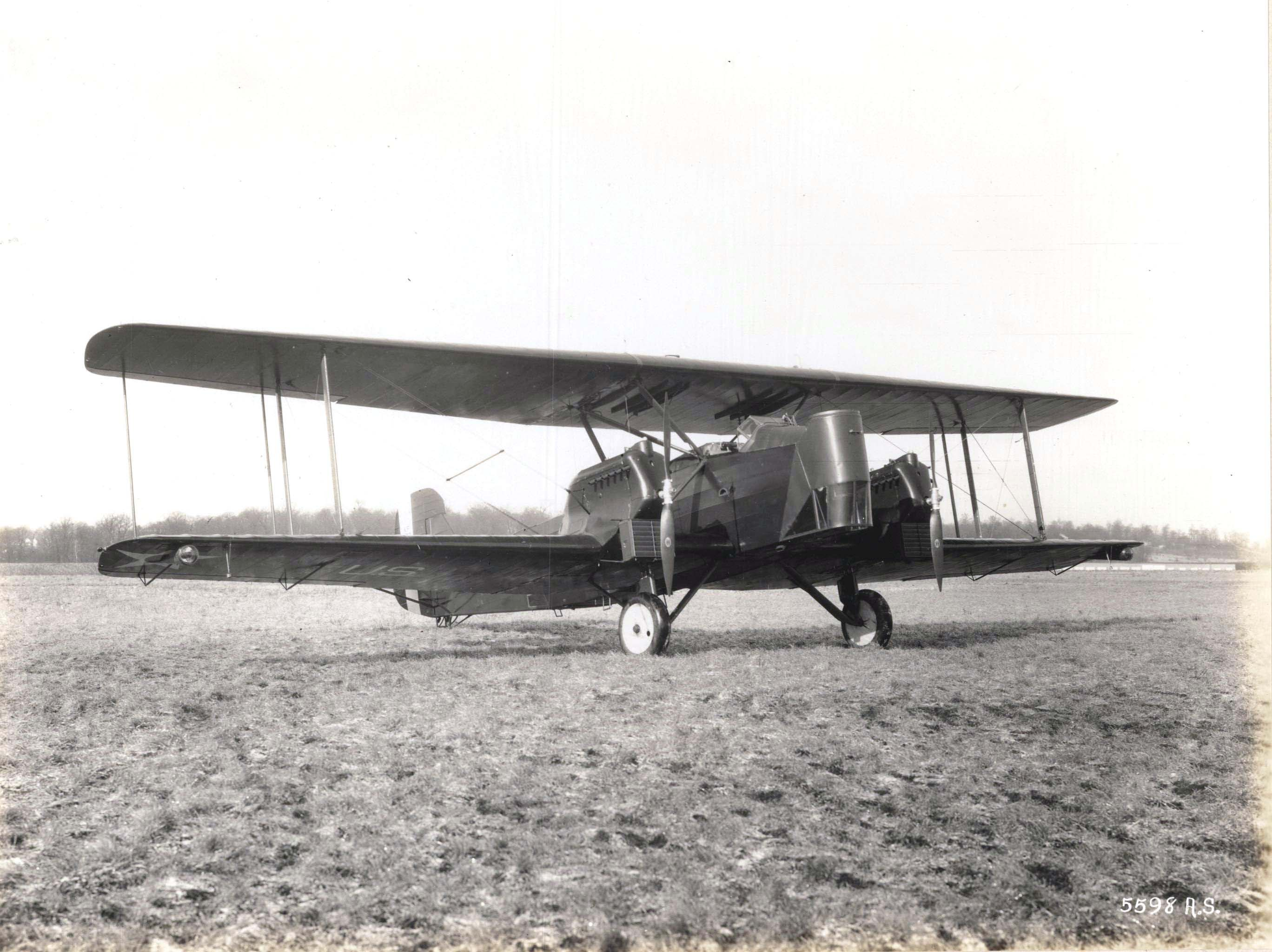
- XLB-5 prototype

General information
- Type: Light bomber
- National origin: United States
- Manufacturer: Keystone Aircraft Corporation
- Primary user: United States Army Air Corps
- Number built: 36

History
- First flight: 1927

The Keystone LB-5 (originally ordered under the Huff-Daland name) was a bomber aircraft produced in the United States in the late 1920s. Its manufacturer nicknamed it the Pirate, but this name was not officially adopted by the United States Army Air Corps (USAAC).

== Design and development ==
The LB-5 was a member of the family of closely related bomber designs that had debuted with the XLB-1 in 1923, and as such, was a large, single-bay, conventional biplane. Like most of the family, it was a twin-engine machine, with engines mounted in nacelles on the lower wing. The prototype XLB-5 had a single tail fin like the XLB-1, the 10 LB-5 production machines were designed with a triple-finned tail under the Huff-Daland name, but the final batch of 25 was redesigned with twin tails and designated LB-5A.

== Operational history ==
Its Liberty L-12 engines featured duralumin adjustable-pitch propellers built by the Standard Steel Propeller Company of Pittsburgh, Pennsylvania, (forerunner of the Hamilton Standard Propeller Company). At least nine tests of tensile strength were made of its propeller blades between 1925 and 1927, one of which reported failure after 34 hours of flying time and 10 hours of testing.

On 28 May 1927, while at 1,200 ft (370 m) altitude near Reynoldsburg, Ohio, the XLB-5 prototype (AC serial 26-208) experienced catastrophic failure of its right engine when a blade separated from the hub with explosive power, tearing the engine apart. Shrapnel sprayed the five-man crew, which included 2nd Bombardment Group commander Major Lewis H. Brereton, flying co-pilot, and all except the nosegunner immediately parachuted. The nosegunner died in the crash, and the gasoline-soaked wreckage subsequently exploded and burned on the ground.

== Variants ==
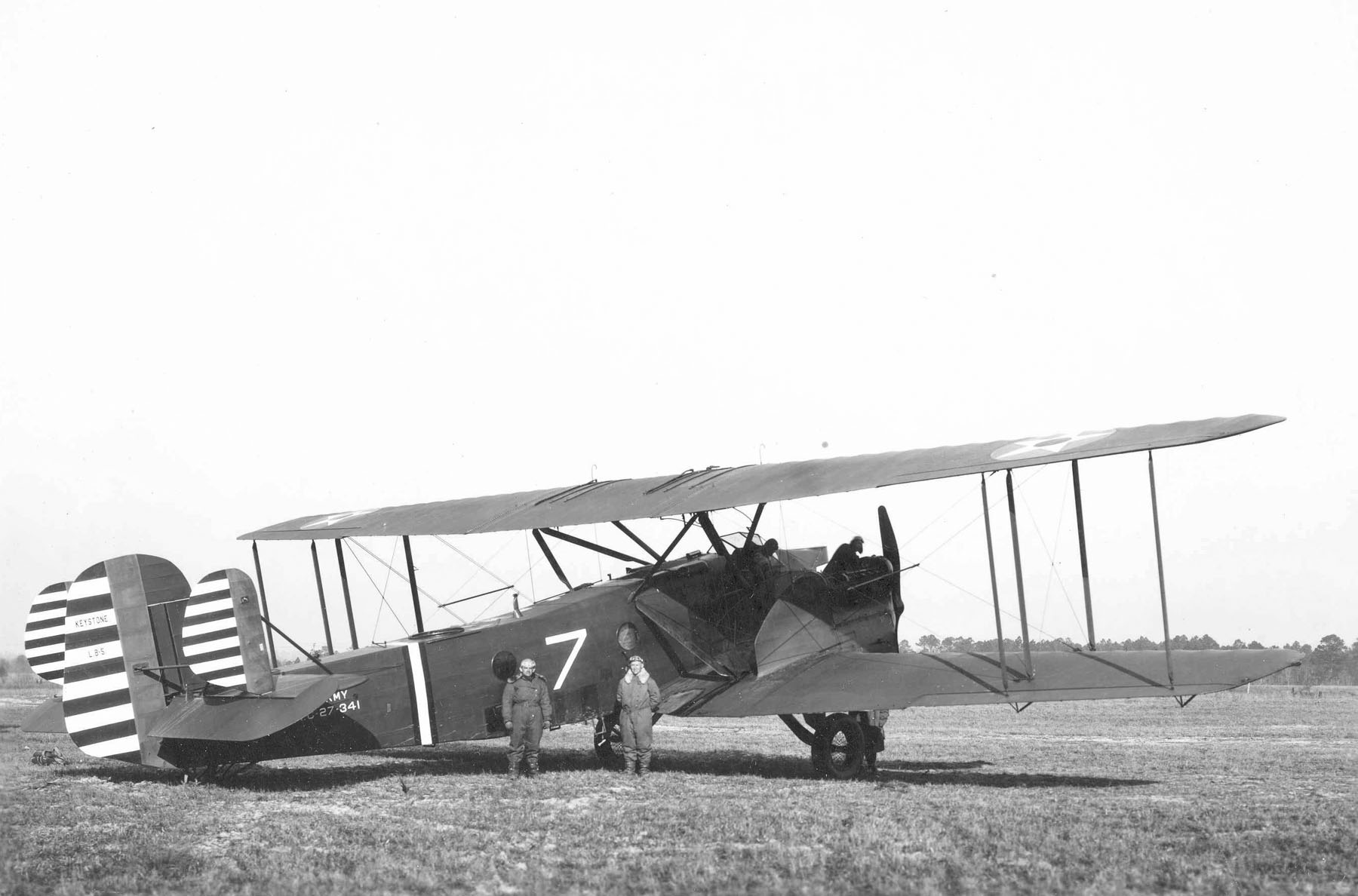
LB-5 with triple tail fins

XLB-5
Prototype (1 built from LB-1) with single tail fin

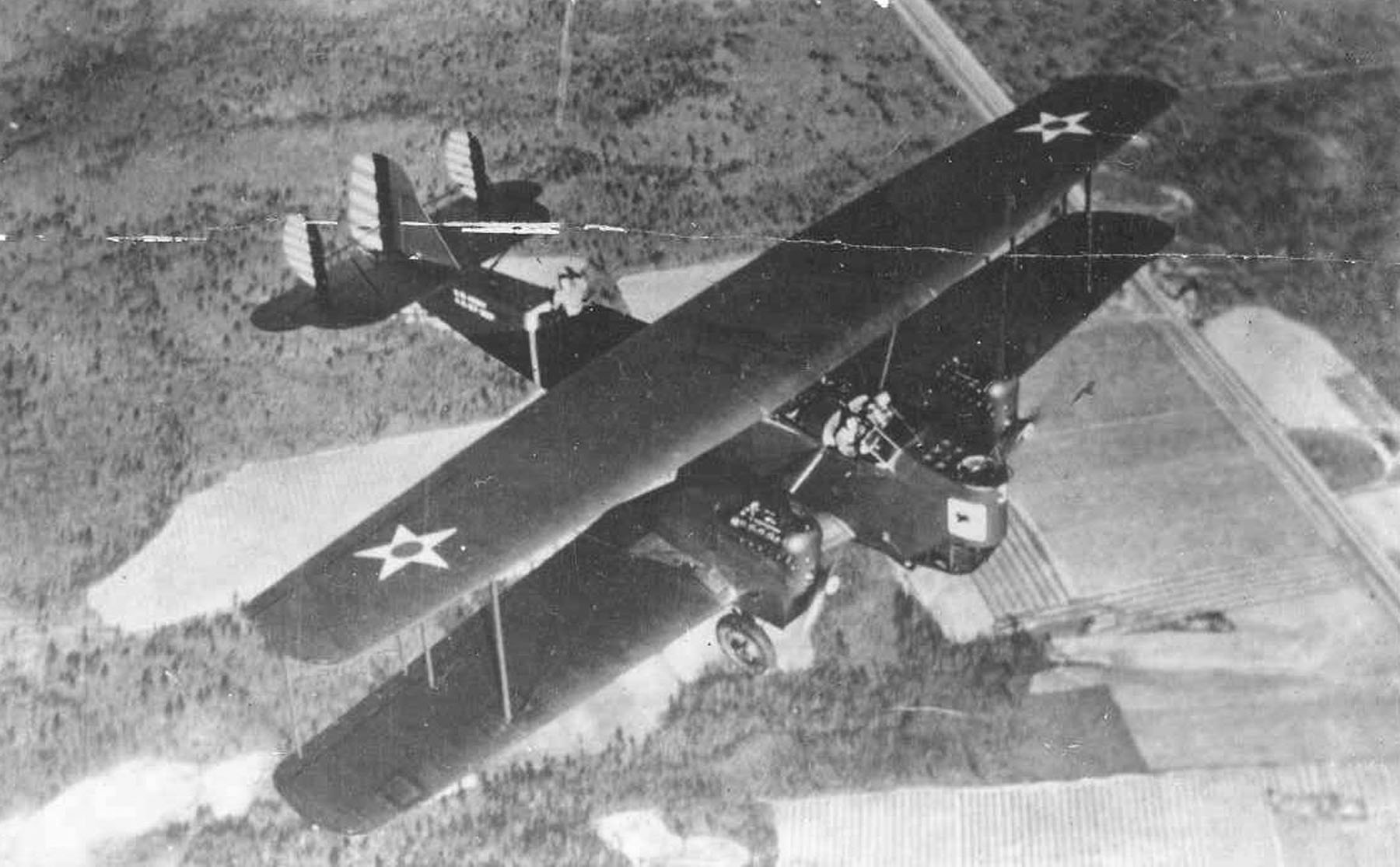
An LB-5 in flight.

LB-5
first production batch with triple tail fins (10 built)

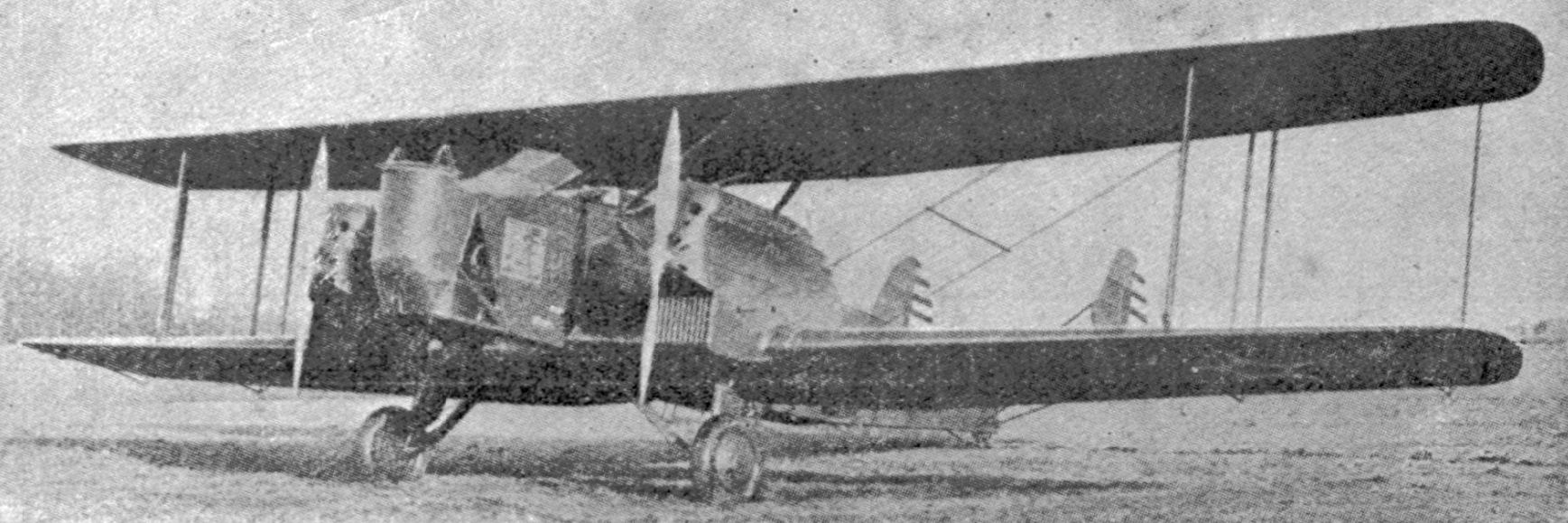
An LB-5A on the ground

LB-5A
second production batch with twin tails (25 built)

== Operators ==
United States

- United States Army Air Corps

== Specifications (LB-5) ==
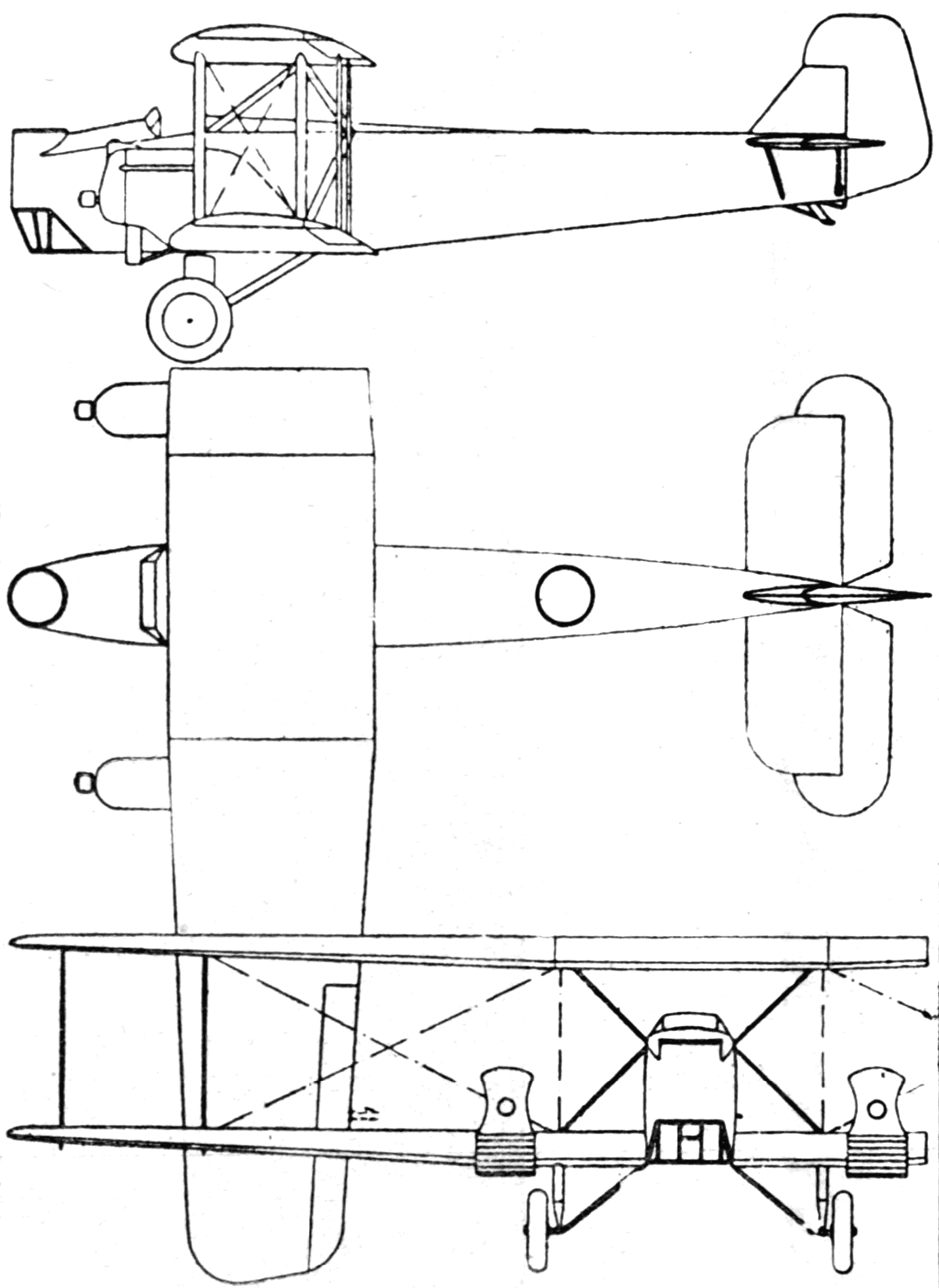
Keystone XLB-5 3-view drawing from L'Air February 15,1928

Data from National Museum of the United States Air Force

General characteristics

- Crew: Five – pilot, copilot, bombardier, two gunners
- Length: 44 ft 8 in (13.61 m)
- Wingspan: 67 ft 0 in (20.42 m)
- Height: 16 ft 10 in (5.13 m)
- Wing area: 1,138 sq ft (105.8 m^{2})
- Empty weight: 7,024 lb (3,194 kg)
- Gross weight: 12,155 lb (5,525 kg)
- Powerplant: 2 × Liberty L-12 , 420 hp (310 kW) each

Performance

- Maximum speed: 107 mph (171 km/h, 93 kn)
- Range: 435 mi (696 km, 378 nmi)
- Service ceiling: 8,000 ft (2,500 m)
- Rate of climb: 250 ft/min (1.3 m/s)

Armament

- 2 × trainable .303 in (7.7 mm) Lewis guns in open position in nose
- 2 × trainable .303 in (7.7 mm) Lewis guns in open dorsal position
- 1 × trainable .303 in (7.7 mm) Lewis gun in ventral hatch
- 2,312 lb (1,051 kg) of bombs
