= Huff-Daland LB-1 =

LB-1
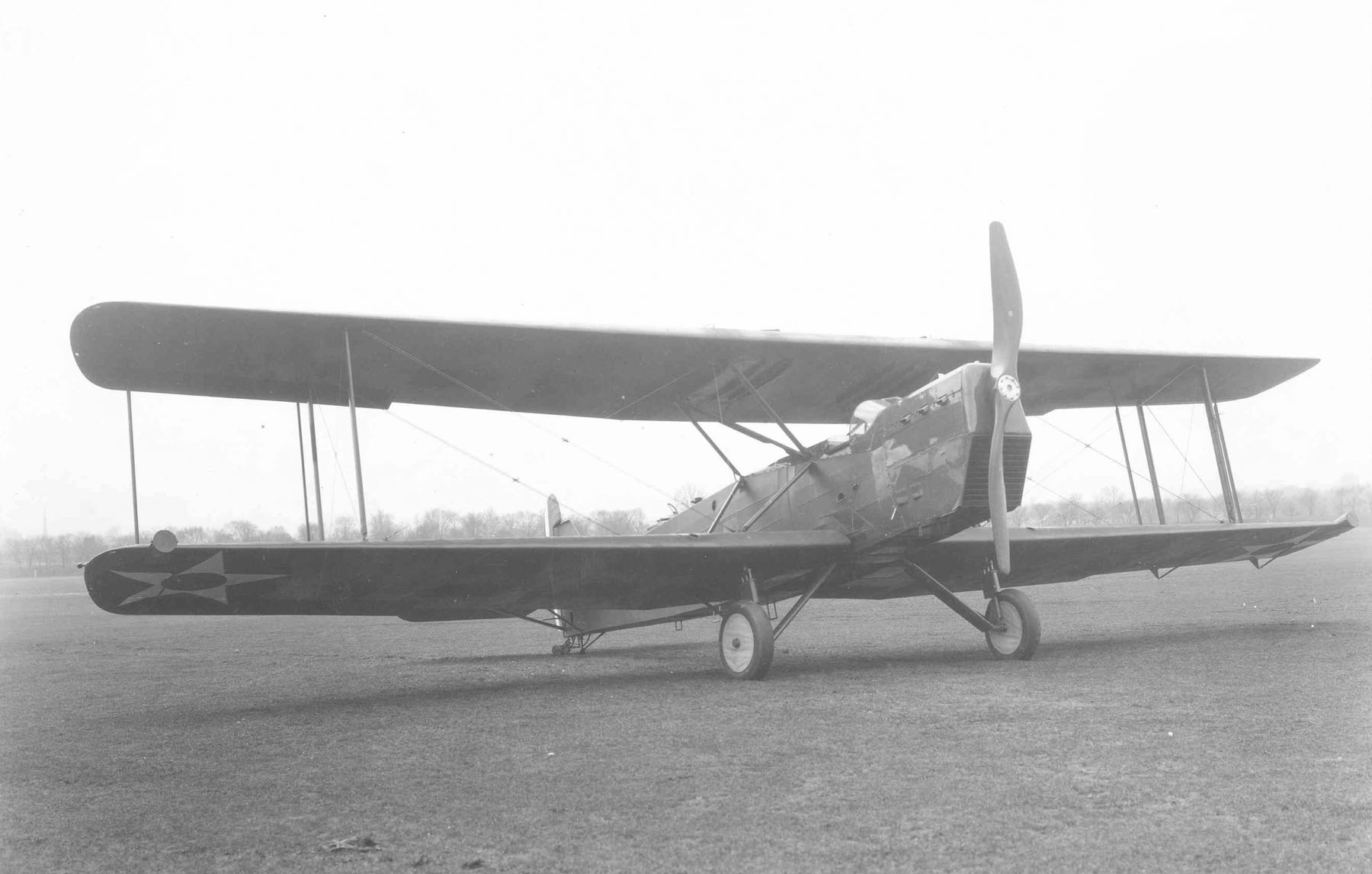

General information
- Type: Single engine biplane bomber
- Manufacturer: Huff-Daland
- Primary user: United States Army Air Service
- Number built: 10

History
- Introduction date: 1923
- First flight: 1923

The Huff-Daland LB-1 was an American biplane light bomber aircraft operated by the United States Army Air Service in the 1920s.

Derived from the XLB-1 prototype bought by the Army in 1923, the LB-1 development aircraft was powered by a single Packard 2A-2500 engine and carried an extra crewman. It proved underpowered in service trials, and was replaced by the twin-engined XLB-3.

== Variants ==
XLB-1
Prototype aircraft, powered by a 750 hp (559 kW) Packard 1A-2540 piston engine; one built (S/N 23-1250).
LB-1
Single-engine light bomber biplane, powered by an 787 hp (587 kW) Packard 2A-2540 piston engine; nine built (S/N 26-377/385).

== Operators ==
United States

- United States Army Air Service
  - 11th Bomb Squadron

== Specifications ==
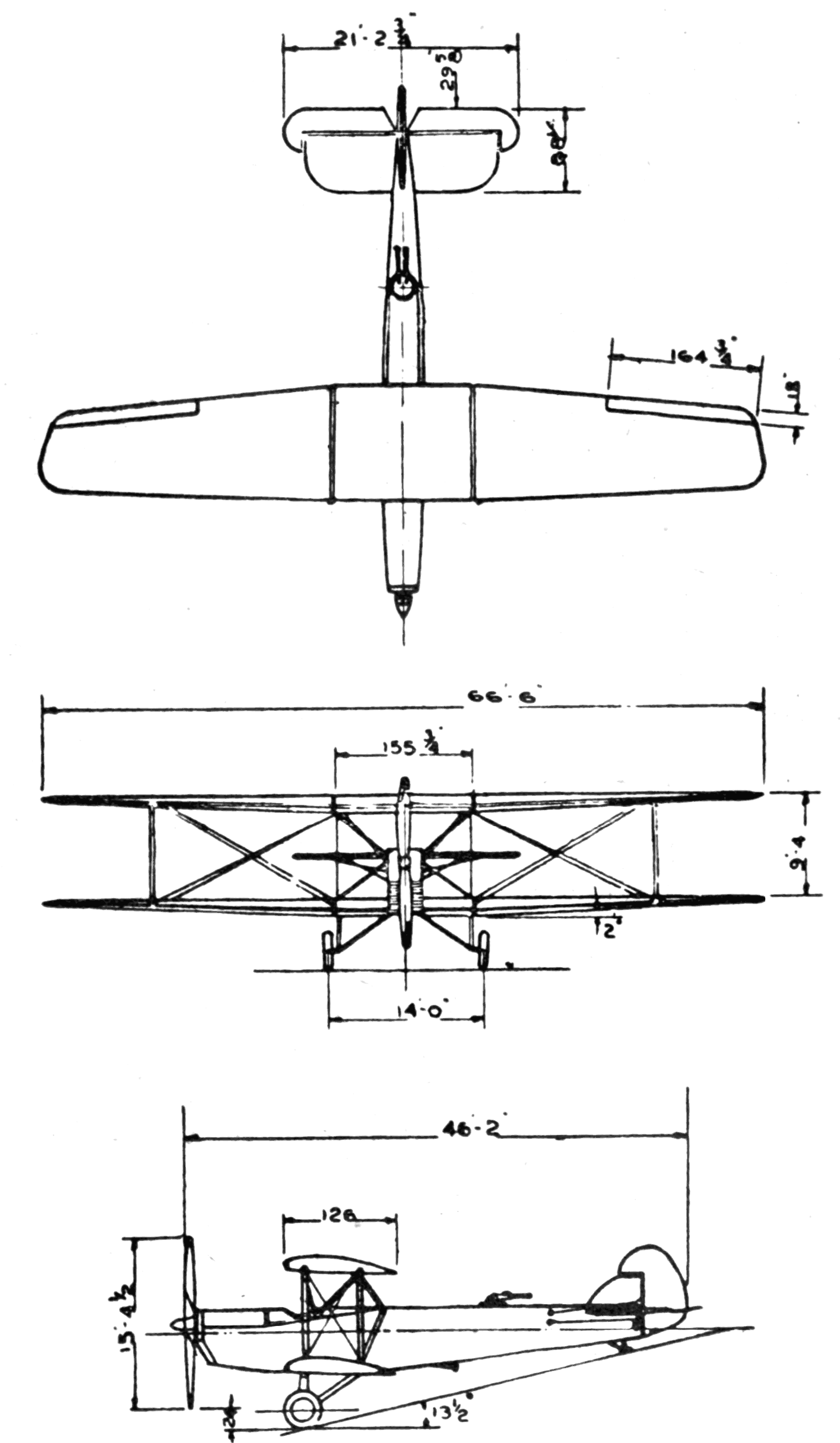
Huff Daland XLB-1 3-view drawing from L'Air September 15, 1926

Data from United States Military Aircraft since 1909

General characteristics

- Crew: Four
- Length: 46 ft 2 in (14.07 m)
- Wingspan: 60 ft 6 in (20.27 m)
- Height: 14 ft 11 in (4.55 m)
- Wing area: 1,137 sq ft (105.7 m^{2})
- Empty weight: 6,237 lb (2,876 kg)
- Gross weight: 12,415 lb (5,631 kg)
- Powerplant: 1 × Packard 2A-2500 water-cooled vee engine , 787 hp (587 kW)

Performance

- Maximum speed: 120 mph (190 km/h, 100 kn)
- Cruise speed: 105 mph (169 km/h, 91 kn)
- Range: 430 mi (692 km, 370 nmi)
- Service ceiling: 11,150 ft (3,400 m)
- Rate of climb: 530 ft/min (2.7 m/s)

Armament

- 5 × .30 in (7.62 mm) machine guns
- 2,750 lb (1,250 kg) of bombs

== See also ==
Related lists

- List of military aircraft of the United States
