= Henry Conger Pratt =

United States Army general

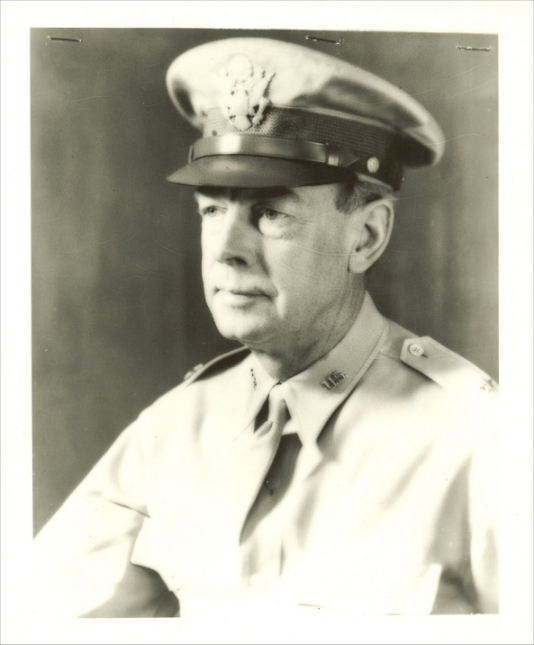
- Major General Henry Conger Pratt, 1940
- Born: September 2, 1882; Fort Stanton, New Mexico Territory, US
- Died: April 6, 1966 (aged 83); Washington, D.C., US
- Burial place: Arlington National Cemetery
- Military career
- Allegiance: United States of America
- Branch: Cavalry, United States Army; Aviation Section, U.S. Signal Corps; Air Service, United States Army; United States Army Air Corps
- Service years: 1904–1946
- Rank: Major general
- Commands: 2nd Wing, GHQAF; Philippine Division
- Conflicts: Pancho Villa Expedition; World War I World War II
- Awards: Distinguished Service Medal (2)

Henry Conger Pratt (September 2, 1882 – April 6, 1966), professionally known as H. Conger Pratt, was a major general in the United States Army. He was awarded a Distinguished Service Medal with one oak leaf cluster, and received awards from Italy, Brazil, and England. He is the only person in American military history to command both an air force wing and an army division.

== Biography ==
Conger Pratt was born on September 2, 1882, at Fort Stanton, New Mexico. His father, Captain Henry Clitz Pratt (1843–1887), died in March 1887. He was raised by his mother, Elizabeth Van Vlick Conger.

In 1909, while serving as a military aide in Washington, D.C., Pratt met Sadie DeRussy Murray, 20-year-old daughter of Brigadier General Arthur Murray, the Chief of Coast Artillery, at her debut. In October 1913, while stationed in California, the couple became engaged and married on February 7, 1914. They remained wedded until her death in October 1963.

Pratt is the third generation of his family to serve in the United States Armed Forces. His father, Captain Henry Clitz Pratt, was a member of the 13th Infantry. In 1862, his father became a lieutenant in the New York Volunteers during the American Civil War. (Note: Clitz Pratt was an officer in a "3-year" regiment before re-enlisting in a heavy artillery regiment used as infantry. He was an original officer of the 13th U.S. Infantry when it was formed in 1866 and saw considerable service during the Indian campaigns. The 13th Infantry had returned to the frontier in 1880 and was engaged at that time in active operations against hostile Paiutes in Colorado and in the campaign to subjugate Geronimo.)

His grandfather was Colonel Henry Clay Pratt (1814–1884), West Point Class of 1837, who had been cited for gallantry during the Mexican–American War. Colonel Pratt served 42 years in the Army.

== Career ==
Pratt spent most of his career as an officer and pilot in the Army antecedents of the United States Air Force. In 1930, he was appointed Assistant Chief of the United States Army Air Corps. In 1935, he became a wing commander at the General Headquarters Air Force, and also served as Chief of Air Corps.

=== Cavalry service ===
On August 1, 1900, Pratt enrolled at the United States Military Academy, entering the Corps of Cadets. He graduated on June 15, 1904, 57th in a class of 124. On July 11, 1904, he was appointed a second lieutenant in Troop E, 4th Cavalry, by War Department General Order No. 121. He entered active duty on September 15. After a month at Fort Leavenworth, he began duty at the Presidio of San Francisco. He trained for a two-year tour of duty in Malabang, which started in September 1905. At the end of his overseas service in 1907, his troop transferred to Fort Snelling, Minnesota.

In April 1909, Pratt was appointed aide-de-camp to President William Howard Taft. He also served concurrent duty as assistant to the Officer-in-charge, Public Buildings and Grounds. In March 1911, he began temporary duty at the Southern Department at Fort Sam Houston. He served five months as an aide to Major General William Harding Carter, who had organized the Army into the Maneuver Division as a demonstration of force to revolutionaries in Mexico.

On March 30, 1911, Pratt was promoted to first lieutenant, filling a vacancy in the 9th Cavalry. In August, he returned to Washington and finished his capital tour in December 1911. He was then assigned as aide-de-camp to Major General Arthur Murray, while awaiting transfer to San Francisco.

In March 1912, Pratt accompanied Murray to command the Army at Presidio. On December 16, 1912, Pratt was transferred to the 1st Cavalry, which was posted at the Presidio. He performed troop duties across California from 1913 to 1914. This included six months at the regiment's camp in Yosemite National Park (Note: Two troops marched 250 miles each May to Camp Yosemite in the Yosemite Valley to patrol the park and enforce Interior Department regulations until fall. 1913 was the final year of cavalry jurisdiction at Yosemite.) in 1913.

He spent 1915 as Murray's aide until the general's retirement in December. From there, Pratt reported to San Antonio, Texas, in January 1916 as aide to Brigadier General George Bell, Jr. He accompanied Bell's headquarters to the El Paso District in support of the Punitive Expedition against Pancho Villa in Mexico. There he was promoted to captain, 1st Cavalry, on July 1. In October he was assigned as assistant adjutant of the district.

On January 31, 1917, Pratt left El Paso to rejoin his original regiment. He arrived at the 4th Cavalry, at Schofield Barracks, Hawaii, in March. When United States entered World War I in April, he received temporary promotion to major. In August, he secured another commission as temporary major, this one in the Signal Corps, and assignment to the Aviation Section. He left Hawaii in the first week of October 1917.

=== World War I and Air Service ===
Pratt transferred into the Aviation Section during wartime expansion, and assigned training duties. He reported to Kelly Field on October 14, and a month later became the post adjutant at Call Field, a newly opened training field at Wichita Falls, Texas. His three months at Call Field prepared him to be the first base commander of Brooks Field near San Antonio. (Note: Originally leased as a satellite of Kelly Field, Brooks became a separate installation in January 1918.)

Pratt was promoted to temporary lieutenant colonel within a few days of taking command in February 1918. During this time he was an administrator, not a flier. In Europe, the Air Service of the Army Expeditionary Force (AEF) organized and began combat operations, and Pratt was promoted to colonel (temporary, Signal Corps) at the end of August. He completed pilot training, receiving a rating of Junior Military Aviator on September 12, 1918. This would qualify him for aviation command.

Within ten days, Pratt was on duty at the Division of Military Aeronautics (DMA) in Washington, D.C. (Note: The DMA was the military component of the Air Service, while the Bureau of Aircraft Production (BAP) was a civil agency overseeing aircraft acquisition.) He was sent to Europe at the end of the first week of October, when the Meuse Argonne Offensive was underway. He participated in staff operations of the American Expeditionary Force.

By the time of his arrival, the final push had begun that resulted in an armistice with Germany on November 11. Pratt returned to the United States and the DMA, assigned to the Board of Organization on December 2. In January 1919, with demobilization underway, he became base commander of Kelly Field.

On March 9, 1919, President Woodrow Wilson issued an executive order formally consolidating all military aviation functions under the Director of Air Service, Major General Charles Menoher, and Pratt was assigned to his staff on March 17 to help organize and implement a "divisional staff" system along the lines of that used by the AEF. As acting Third Assistant Executive, he supervised the Operations and Training Group (Note: Tantamount to G-3 under the divisional staff system) until April, when General Billy Mitchell took over.

In August 1919, Congress extended the existence of the Air Service for another year, while it determined its role during peacetime. All of Pratt's wartime promotions expired by September 8, returning him to his established rank of captain. He entered the course of study for junior officers at the General Staff School in Washington, D.C., on September 1.

By the date of his graduation, June 29, 1920, Congress passed the National Defense Act of 1920. (Note: Also known as the "Army Reorganization Act".) This made the Air Service a statutory combatant arm of the line, enabling Pratt to transfer to that branch. On July 1, 1920, he was promoted to major. He was then transferred to the Air Service on August 6. (Note: This was an administrative maneuver under the Army's seniority system to enable officers to maintain their relative precedence within the service. For instance, both Hap Arnold (USMA Class of 1907) and Pratt (Class of 1904) were promoted to major on July 1, but Pratt received his transfer to the Air Service five days before Arnold making him 17 places higher in seniority.) He served in the Office of the Chief of Air Service until July 13, 1920, when he again became post commander at Kelly Field.

On September 25, Pratt moved up to Air Officer, Eighth Corps Area, (Note: Air Service/Air Corps units were under the control of corps area and department commanders until 1935. The position of "Air Officer" was advisory only, albeit often the most senior Air Service officer in the corps area. Pratt succeeded Lieut. Col. James E. Fechet, who had been transferred to the Office of the Chief of Air Service to become chief of the Operations and Plans Group, beginning a long run that culminated in his becoming Chief of Air Corps. The Eighth Corps Area eventually became known as "Siberia," since it was the position to which both Billy Mitchell and Frank Andrews were demoted and exiled.) located at Fort Sam Houston, until April 26, 1921. During that period his pilot rating was changed to 'Airplane Pilot'. (Note: The National Defense Act of 1920 reduced the number of different ratings from eleven to four, and redesignated them. At that date, October 5, 1920, there was no distinction between basic and advanced ratings.)

In spring 1921, Pratt began more than three years of continuous professional military education. By June, he completed the student officer course at the Air Service Bombardment School at Kelly by the 2nd Group. (Note: Pratt was replaced as Air Officer, Eighth Corps Area, by Major Carl Spatz.) In September, he entered the courses of the General Service Schools at Fort Leavenworth: the School of the Line in 1921–22, and the Regular Course of the General Staff School in 1922–23.

Pratt completed the line course as a distinguished graduate. Between August 15, 1923, and June 30, 1924, he successfully completed the course of study at the Army War College in Washington, D.C.

On June 30, 1924, Pratt was assigned to the Operations and Plans Group in the Office of the Director of Air Service. He would serve there for four years.

=== Air Corps ===
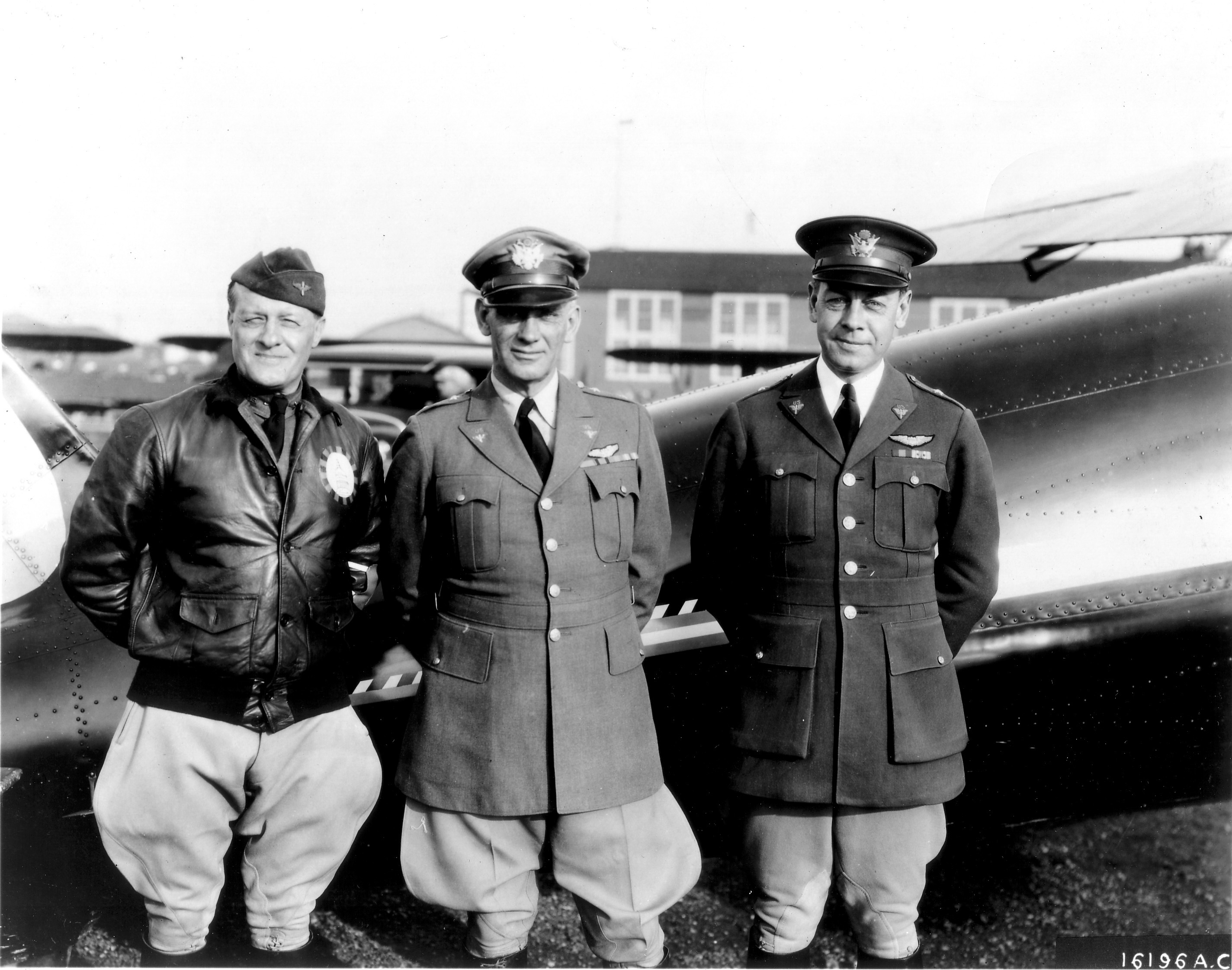
Pratt (at right), with Generals Benjamin D. Foulois, Assistant Chief of Air Corps, and James E. Fechet, Chief of Air Corps, in 1931.

On July 1, 1926, the Air Service was renamed the Air Corps by act of Congress, but little changed in the service. Pratt's position continued, now under the Chief of Air Corps.

On June 5, 1928, Pratt was assigned command of Mitchel Field, New York, and promoted to lieutenant colonel, Air Corps. The Army's annual maneuvers were held in Ohio in the last two weeks of May 1929. Pratt was assigned to command the aviation of the "Blue" force near Dayton. He established his headquarters at the Fairfield Air Depot and dispersed his 82 airplanes at several airports in the vicinity. During maneuvers, his bombardment and attack forces made several simulated air raids on "Red" force airfields in the vicinity of Columbus and Newark, Ohio, while his pursuit aircraft defended against Red force attacks, culminating in a large mock air battle over Cincinnati at the end of the first week. The maneuvers concluded with a live ordnance demonstration that Pratt orchestrated on the portion of the depot reservation that is now the main runway of Wright-Patterson Air Force Base.

In July 1929, Pratt was transferred to Fort Shafter, to assume the duties of Air Officer for the Hawaiian Department. This overseas tour was cut short in July 1930 by the retirement of Brig. Gen. William E. Gillmore, one of the three Assistant Chiefs of Air Corps. Gillmore's retirement left a vacancy for Chief of the Air Corps Materiel Division, and President Herbert Hoover named Pratt to fill the position. Pratt became a brigadier general and took charge of the division on August 1, 1930, at its Wright Field headquarters. (Note: Gillmore had been chief of the Materiel Division since its inception in July 1926. However, in June 1929 he swapped positions with Brigadier General Benjamin Foulois to be chief of the Operations Division (first assistant chief of Air Corps). When Gillmore retired, Foulois returned to the first assistant position, leaving the Materiel Division job vacant.) One of the key decisions of Pratt's tenure was to advise the Boeing Aircraft Company in 1932 that the design and production specifications of its proposed Boeing 247 airliner were developments of the Air Corps' B-9 monoplane bomber and therefore classified information, and that the Air Corps would block export of the airliner if Boeing responded to interest expressed by the Empire of Japan. His term as Assistant Chief of Air Corps expired July 16, 1934, and he returned to his permanent rank of lieutenant colonel with temporary duty in the Office of the Chief of Air Corps.

Pratt was given command of the 2nd Wing at Langley Field, Virginia, after the War Department activated the General Headquarters (GHQ) Air Force on March 2, 1935. (Note: The wings of the GHQ Air Force were not higher echelon units in the modern sense, but regional subcommands. The 2d Wing (the "Atlantic wing") controlled the four Air Corps combat groups based in the Eastern United States. Pratt was the only one of the new wing commanders, all lieutenant colonels, who had already served as a general officer before GHQ Air Force was activated.) In December 1935, the GHQ Air Force conducted a major exercise under field conditions in which 55 of its best bombardment and attack aircraft simulated air raids on Miami, Florida, defended by 55 Boeing P-26 fighters based at Miami Municipal Airport under Pratt's direction. The interceptors succeeded in defeating the first simulated attack on December 3, launching 36 fighters just four minutes after 18 bombers were observed over Hollywood, Florida, theoretically wiping out the bomber force. In the week of operations that followed, the attackers succeeded in reaching their targets only when the bombers and attack aircraft approached simultaneously from different directions, or when the attacking bomber force split to use similar tactics.

September 1935, politically embattled Chief of Air Corps Benjamin Foulois decided to retire in December "for the good of the service" and took his terminal leave. The Roosevelt administration scrutinized senior Air Corps officers for a replacement, and looked at Pratt as one of its two main candidates. "He [Pratt] has greater mental ability than others on the list," noted Secretary of War George Dern to Roosevelt, "but it is possible that he is not as cooperative as Westover." Oscar Westover was eventually selected to become the Chief of Air Corps.

Pratt received his permanent promotion to colonel on August 1, 1936. On January 16, 1937, the Senate approved a promotion list to permanent brigadier general that included Pratt and, among others, George C. Marshall, with date of rank from January 1. Pratt became commandant of the Air Corps Tactical School (ACTS) and ex officio president of the Air Corps Board at Maxwell Field, Alabama, on March 14, his last assignment as a member of the Air Corps.

=== 1938 to retirement ===
Pratt was the first member of the Air Corps to achieve the permanent grade of brigadier general. He completed his assignment as commandant of ACTS on August 6, 1938. There were no vacancies in the Air Corps for a general officer, so he returned to Washington. (Note: Officers promoted to permanent general officer rank in the army are officially considered no longer members of any combat arm of the line or branch.)

In 1938, Pratt served as commandant of the Air Corps Tactical School. During the pre-war years of 1935–1940, Pratt commanded both an air force wing and an army division. After becoming a general officer, Pratt was assigned non-aviation commands including ground forces commands. During World War II Pratt did not serve as a general in the Army Air Forces but as commander of service and defense commands in the Western Hemisphere.

October 24, 1938, he arrived in Manila to take command of the 23rd Infantry Brigade at Fort William McKinley. The 23rd Brigade was the Philippine Scouts component of the division, consisting of the 45th and 57th Infantry Regiments. It served tactical responsibility for the defense of the Lingayen area on Luzon.

Pratt served as interim commander of the Philippine Division twice: from July 25, 1939, to November 1939, when Major General Walter S. Grant was advanced to command of the Philippine Department; and from May 31, 1940, to the end of his own tour on November 6, 1940, replacing Major General George Grunert. These two terms makes Pratt the only person to command both a U.S. Air Force wing and an army division.

Prior to his return to the United States, Pratt was promoted to temporary major general. This permanent rank was granted on March 1, 1941. His next assignment was field command of the II Corps, from December 26, 1940, to the following August 21. He was headquartered in the Pennsylvania Railroad Building in Wilmington, Delaware. During his time as commander, both the 28th and 29th Infantry Divisions were inducted into Federal Service as part of II Corps, on February 17 and February 3, 1941, respectively. August 1941, Pratt moved to Baltimore to command the Third Corps Area, which had become a service command headquarters in 1940. He was serving there when the United States entered World War II on December 7, 1941.

In January 1942, Pratt took command of the Trinidad Base Command at Fort Read. He had been chosen upon the recommendation of Lt. General Frank M. Andrews, former commander of GHQ Air Force who was then commanding the Caribbean Defense Command. In November 1943, he returned to the United States for duty with the Third Service Command. In January 1944 he commanded the Southern Defense Command. His last command was of the Western Defense Command in October 1944, where he was serving as commanding general. He issued the revocation order of December 17, 1944, rescinding the order for Japanese American internment. At the end of the war he was assigned to the Office of the Chief of Staff.

Pratt retired on September 1, 1946, after serving 42 years. (Note: By law retirement was mandatory at the age of 64.) He ended his career with ratings of Senior Pilot, Combat Observer, and Technical Observer. He received a Bronze Oak Leaf Cluster, in lieu of a second Army Distinguished Service Medal. Pratt had been recognized as a Knight of the Order of the Crown of Italy, Grand Officer of the Order of the Liberator (Venezuela) and the Order of the Southern Cross (Brazil), Commander of the Juan Pablo Duarte Order of Merit (Dominican Republic), and Knight Commander of the Order of the British Empire (KBE). He was carried on the retired list of the United States Air Force in the rank of major general.

== Awards and decorations ==
SOURCES - U.S. decorations: Biographical Data on Air Force General Officers, 1917–1952, Volume II – L through Z; Foreign decorations: Cullum's Biographical Register, Volume 9

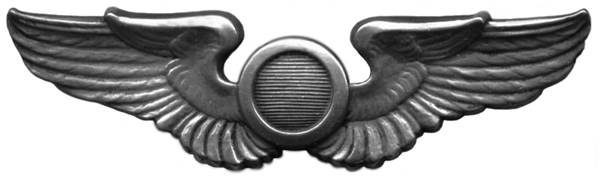
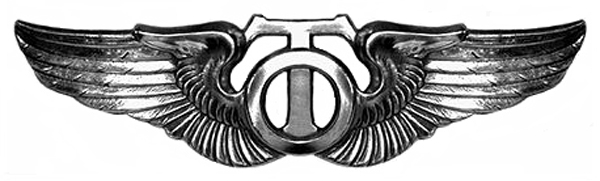

Senior Pilot Badge–Combat Observer Badge–Technical Observer Badge

1st Row	Army Distinguished Service Medal w/ OLC		Mexican Border Service Medal	World War I Victory Medal with three bronze battle stars
2nd Row	American Defense Service Medal	American Campaign Medal	World War II Victory Medal	Knight of the Order of the Crown of Italy
3rd Row	Grand Officer of the Order of the Southern Cross	Grand Officer of the Order of the Liberator	Commander of the Juan Pablo Duarte Order of Merit	Knight Commander, Order of the British Empire

== Notes ==
Footnotes

Citations
