= United States Army Air Corps =

Air warfare branch of the US Army from 1926 to 1941

- Branch insignia of the Army Air Corps
- Active: 1926 – 1942
- Disbanded: September 18, 1947
- Country: United States
- Branch: Army
- Type: Air force
- Role: Aerial warfare
- Size: 14,650 men, 1,646 aircraft (1932); 16,863 men, 855 aircraft (1936); 152,125 men, 6,777 aircraft (1941)
- Garrison/HQ: Munitions Building, Washington, D.C.
- Colors: Ultramarine blue and golden orange
- March: Army Air Corps
- Engagements: World War II

Commanders
- Notable commanders: Major General Benjamin D. Foulois; Major General Henry H. Arnold

Insignia
- Roundel

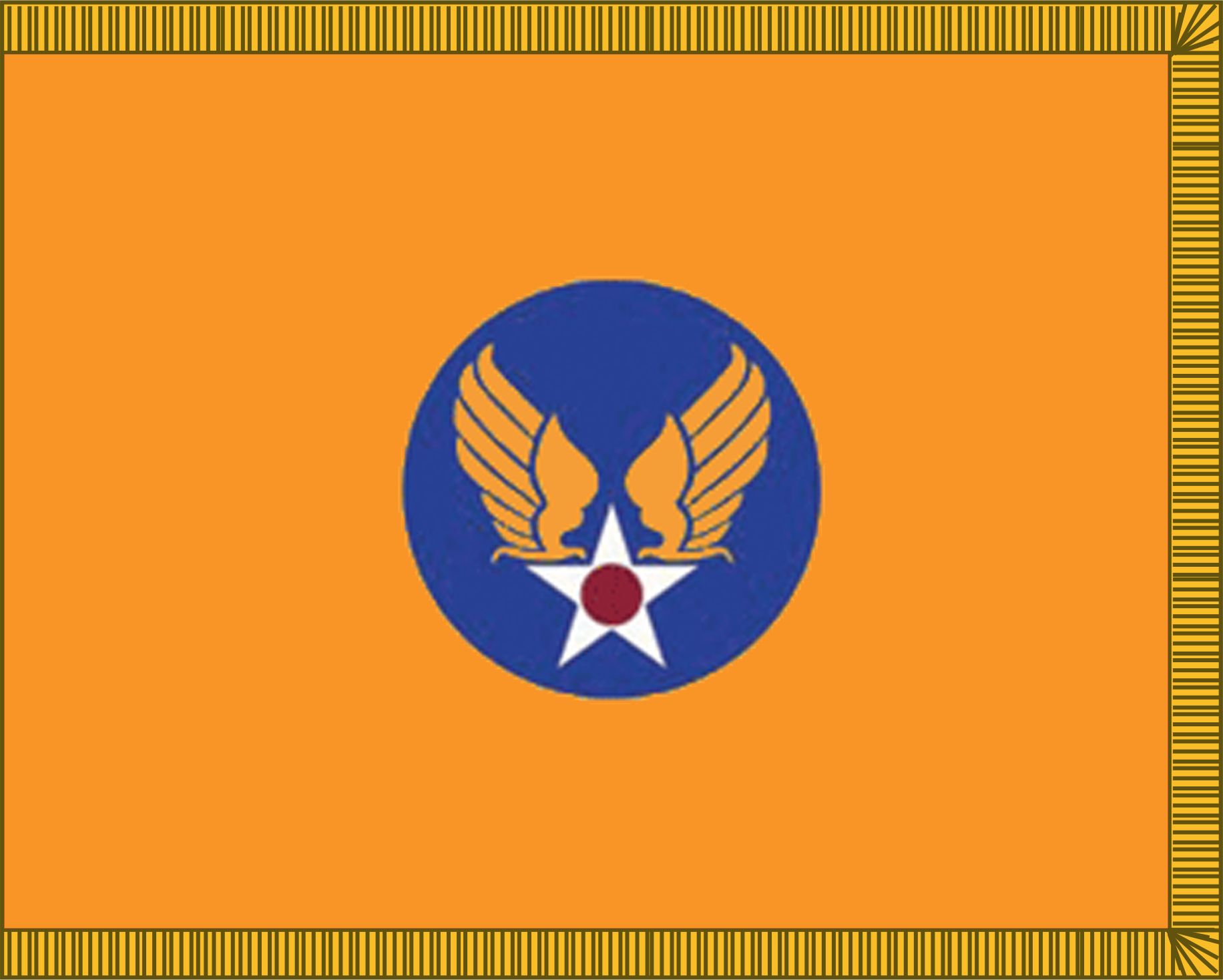
- US Army Air Corps Flag

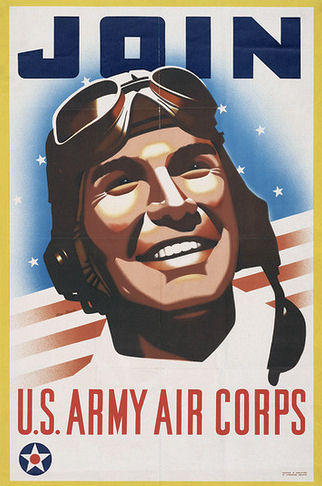
United States Army Air Corps Recruiting Poster

The United States Army Air Corps (USAAC) was the aerial warfare service component of the United States Army between 1926 and 1941. After World War I, as early aviation became an increasingly important part of modern warfare, a philosophical rift developed between more traditional ground-based army personnel and those who felt that aircraft were being underutilized and that air operations were being stifled for political reasons unrelated to their effectiveness. The USAAC was renamed from the earlier United States Army Air Service on 2 July 1926, and was part of the larger United States Army. The Air Corps became the United States Army Air Forces (USAAF) on 20 June 1941, giving it greater autonomy from the Army's middle-level command structure. During World War II, although not an administrative echelon, the Air Corps (AC) remained as one of the combat arms of the Army until 1947, when it was legally abolished by legislation establishing the Department of the Air Force.

The Air Corps was renamed by the United States Congress largely as a compromise between the advocates of a separate air arm and those of the traditionalist Army high command who viewed the aviation arm as an auxiliary branch to support the ground forces. Although its members worked to promote the concept of air power and an autonomous air force in the years between the world wars, its primary purpose by Army policy remained support of ground forces rather than independent operations.

On 1 March 1935, still struggling with the issue of a separate air arm, the Army activated the General Headquarters Air Force for centralized control of aviation combat units within the continental United States, separate from but coordinate with the Air Corps. The separation of the Air Corps from control of its combat units caused problems of unity of command that became more acute as the Air Corps enlarged in preparation for World War II. This was resolved by the creation of the Army Air Forces (AAF), making both organizations subordinate to the new higher echelon.

On 20 June 1941, the Army Air Corps' existence as the primary air arm of the U.S. Army changed to that of solely being the training and logistics elements of the then-new United States Army Air Forces, which embraced the formerly-named General Headquarters Air Force under the new Air Force Combat Command organization for front-line combat operations; this new element, along with the Air Corps, comprised the USAAF.

The Air Corps ceased to have an administrative structure after 9 March 1942, but as "the permanent statutory organization of the air arm, and the principal component of the Army Air Forces," the overwhelming majority of personnel assigned to the AAF were members of the Air Corps.

== Creation of the Air Corps ==
Be it enacted by the Senate and House of Representatives of the United States of America in Congress Assembled, that the Act entitled "An act for making further and more effectual provision for the national defense, and other purposes," approved June 3, 1916, as amended, be, and the same is hereby, amended so that the Air Service referred to in that Act and all subsequent Acts of Congress shall be known as the Air Corps.

— Public Law 69-446, 2 July 1926

The U.S. Army Air Service had a brief but turbulent history. Created during World War I by executive order of President Woodrow Wilson after America entered the war in April 1917 as the increasing use of airplanes and the military uses of aviation were readily apparent as the war continued to its climax, the U.S. Army Air Service gained permanent legislative authority in 1920 as a combatant arm of the line of the United States Army. There followed a six-year struggle between adherents of airpower and the supporters of the traditional military services about the value of an independent Air Force, intensified by struggles for funds caused by skimpy budgets, as much an impetus for independence as any other factor.

The Lassiter Board, a group of general staff officers, recommended in 1923 that the Air Service be augmented by an offensive force of bombardment and pursuit units under the command of Army general headquarters in time of war, and many of its recommendations became Army regulations. The War Department desired to implement the Lassiter Board's recommendations, but the administration of President Calvin Coolidge chose instead to economize by radically cutting military budgets, particularly the Army's. (Note: The Coolidge administration boasted of cutting the War Department's budget by 75%.) The Lampert Committee of the House of Representatives in December 1925 proposed a unified air force independent of the Army and Navy, plus a department of defense to coordinate the three armed services. However another board, headed by Dwight Morrow, was appointed in September 1925 by Coolidge ostensibly to study the "best means of developing and applying aircraft in national defense" but in reality to minimize the political impact of the pending court-martial of Billy Mitchell (and to preempt the findings of the Lampert Committee). It declared that no threat of air attack was likely to exist to the United States, rejected the idea of a department of defense and a separate department of air, and recommended minor reforms that included renaming the air service to allow it "more prestige".

In early 1926 the Military Affairs Committee of the Congress rejected all bills set forth before it on both sides of the issue. They fashioned a compromise in which the findings of the Morrow Board were enacted as law, while providing the air arm a "five-year plan" for expansion and development. Maj. Gen. Mason Patrick, the Chief of Air Service, had proposed that it be made a semi-independent service within the War Department along the lines of the Marine Corps within the Navy Department, but this was rejected; only the cosmetic name change was accepted. (Note: Gen. Patrick's proposal of an Air Corps equivalent to the Marine Corps was characterized by Brig. Gen. Fox Conner (and not for the first nor last time by General Staff opponents of Air Corps independence) as a "promotion scheme".) The legislation changed the name of the Air Service to the Air Corps, (in the words of one analyst) "thereby strengthening the conception of military aviation as an offensive, striking arm rather than an auxiliary service."

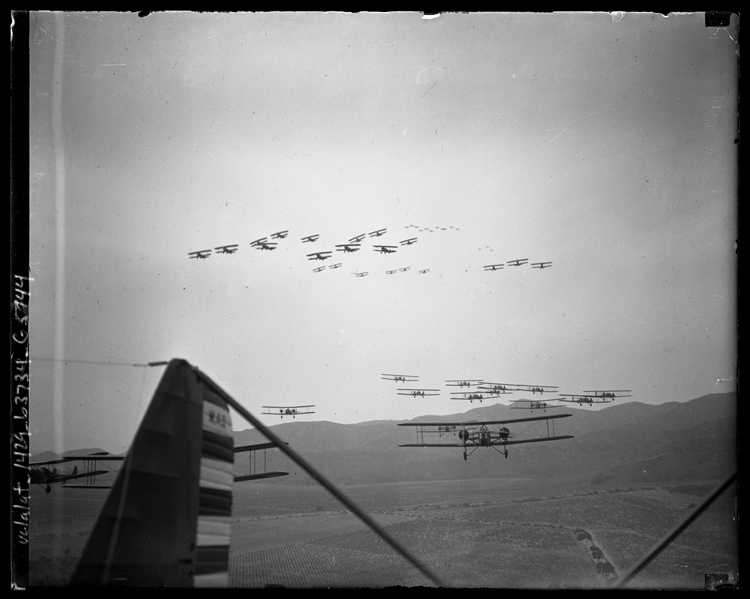
Formations of Keystone LB-7s (lower) and Boeing P-12s (upper) on aerial maneuvers over Burbank, California, 1930

The Air Corps Act (44 Stat. 780) became law on 2 July 1926. In accordance with the Morrow Board's recommendations, the act created an additional Assistant Secretary of War to "help foster military aeronautics", and established an air section in each division of the General Staff for a period of three years. Two additional brigadier generals would serve as assistant chiefs of the Air Corps. (Note: All Air Corps generals held temporary ranks. The Air Corps did not have a member promoted to permanent establishment general officer until 1937, and he was promptly removed from the Air Corps.) Previous provisions of the National Defense Act of 1920 that all flying units be commanded only by rated personnel and that flight pay be awarded were continued. The Air Corps also retained the "Prop and Wings" as its branch insignia through its disestablishment in 1947. Patrick became Chief of the Air Corps and Brig. Gen. James E. Fechet continued as his first assistant chief. On 17 July 1926, two lieutenant colonels were promoted to brigadier general for four-year terms as assistant chiefs of Air Corps: Frank P. Lahm, to command the new Air Corps Training Center, and William E. Gillmore, in command of the Materiel Division. (Note: Gillmore had been chief of the Supply Division of the Air Service. Both he and Lahm served a single tour. Of the three assistant chiefs, Fechet succeeded Patrick in December 1927, Gillmore retired on 30 June 1930, and Lahm reverted to his permanent rank on 16 July 1930.)

Of the new law and organization, however, Wesley F. Craven and James L. Cate in the official history of the United States Army Air Forces concluded that: "The bill which was finally enacted purported to be a compromise, but it leaned heavily on the Morrow recommendations. The Air Corps Act of 2 July 1926 effected no fundamental innovation. The change in designation meant no change in status: the Air Corps was still a combatant branch of the Army with less prestige than the Infantry."

The position of the air arm within the Department of War remained essentially the same as before, that is, the flying units were under the operational control of the various ground forces corps area commands and not the Air Corps, which remained responsible for procurement and maintenance of aircraft, supply, and training. Because of a lack of legally specified duties and responsibilities, the new position of Assistant Secretary of War for Air, held by F. Trubee Davison from July 1926 to March 1933, proved of little help in promoting autonomy for the air arm.

=== Five-year expansion program ===
The Air Corps Act gave authorization to carry out a five-year expansion program. However, a lack of appropriations caused the beginning of the program to be delayed until 1 July 1927. Patrick proposed an increase to 63 tactical squadrons (from an existing 32) to maintain the program of the Lassiter Board already in effect, but Chief of Staff Gen. John Hines rejected the recommendation in favor of a plan drawn up by ground force Brig. Gen. Hugh Drum that proposed 52 squadrons. (Note: The General Staff viewed the "five-year plan" as an opponent of the Army in general and fought it bitterly, citing it as a destructive force at every opportunity. General Drum also chaired the 1933 Drum Board, created specifically to oppose (and revise) plans and appropriation requests submitted by Chief of Air Corps Foulois that were not to the General Staff's liking.) The act authorized expansion to 1,800 airplanes, 1,650 officers, and 15,000 enlisted men, to be reached in regular increments over a five-year period. None of the goals was reached by July 1932. Neither of the relatively modest increases in airplanes or officers was accomplished until 1938 because adequate funds were never appropriated and the coming of the Great Depression forced reductions in pay and modernization across the board in the Army. Organizationally the Air Corps doubled from seven to fifteen groups, but the expansion was meaningless because all were seriously understrength in aircraft and pilots. (Origin of first seven groups shown here)

Air Corps groups added 1927–1937
Group	Station	Date activated	Aircraft type
18th Pursuit Group	Wheeler Field, Hawaii	20 January 1927	PW-9
7th Bombardment Group	Rockwell Field, California	1 June 1928	LB-7, B-3A
12th Observation Group (Note: Inactivated on 20 May 1937)	Brooks Field, Texas	1 October 1930	O-19
20th Pursuit Group	Mather Field, California	15 November 1930	P-12
8th Pursuit Group	Langley Field, Virginia	1 April 1931	P-6
17th Pursuit Group (Note: Redesignated 17th Attack Group (1935), 17th Bomb Group (1939))	March Field, California	1 July 1931	P-12
19th Bomb Group	Rockwell Field, California	24 June 1932	B-10
16th Pursuit Group	Albrook Field, Canal Zone	1 December 1932	P-12
10th Transport Group	Patterson Field, Ohio	20 May 1937	C-27 C-33

As units of the Air Corps increased in number, so did higher command echelons. The 2nd Wing, activated in 1922 as part of the Air Service, remained the only wing organization in the new Air Corps until 1929, when it was redesignated the 2nd Bombardment Wing in anticipation of the activation of the 1st Bombardment Wing, providing a bombardment wing on each coast. The 1st Bomb Wing was activated in 1931, followed by the 3rd Attack Wing in 1932, protecting the southern border, at which time the 1st became the 1st Pursuit Wing. The three wings became the foundation of General Headquarters Air Force upon its activation in 1935.

=== Aircraft and personnel 1926–1935 ===
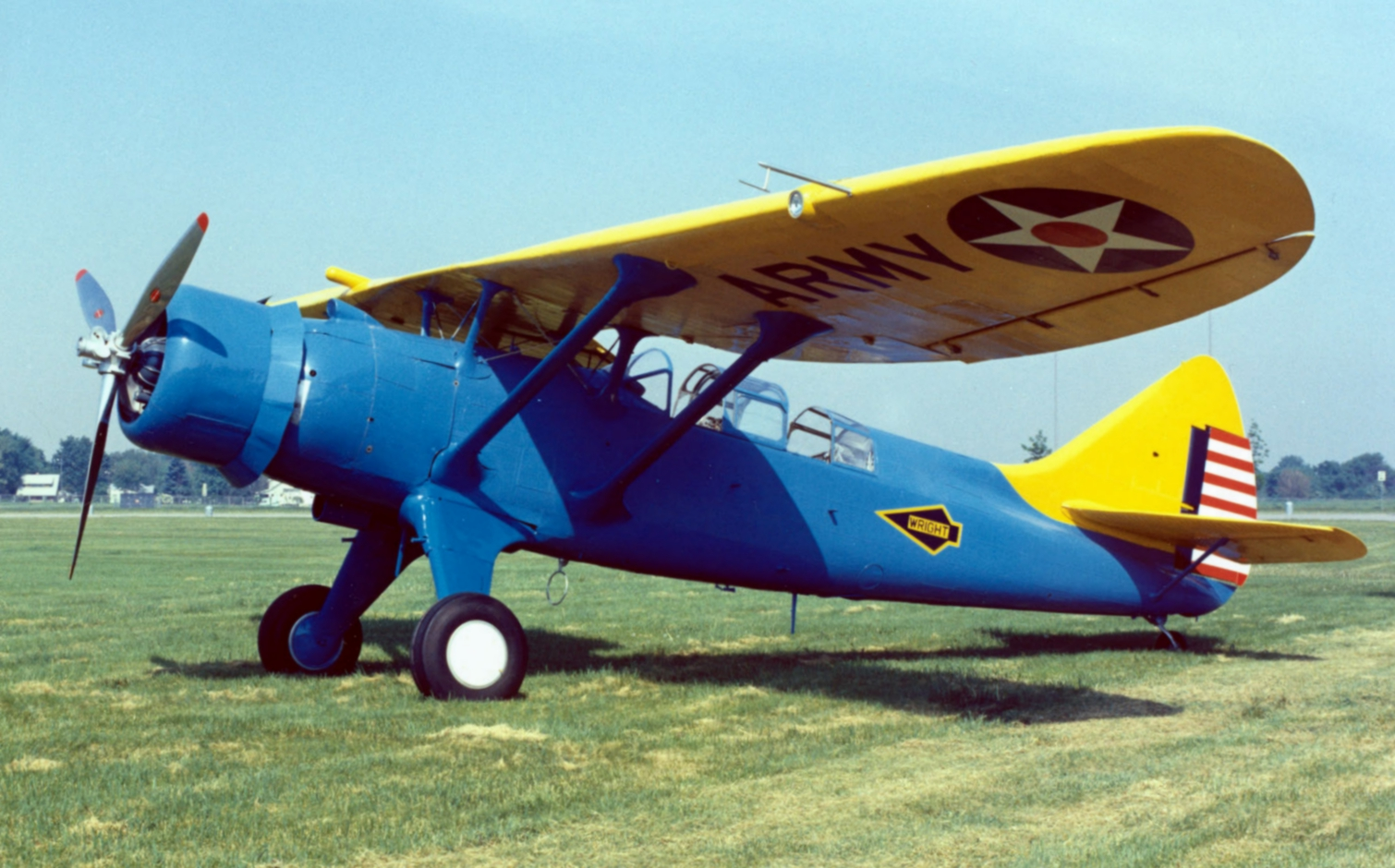
Douglas O-46A at Wright Field

The Air Corps adopted a new color scheme for painting its aircraft in 1927, heretofore painted olive drab. The wings and tails of aircraft were painted chrome yellow, with the words "U.S. ARMY" displayed in large black lettering on the undersurface of the lower wings. Tail rudders were painted with a vertical dark blue band at the rudder hinge and 13 alternating red-and-white horizontal stripes trailing. The painting of fuselages olive drab was changed to blue in the early 1930s, and this motif continued until late 1937, when all new aircraft (now all-metal) were left unpainted except for national markings.

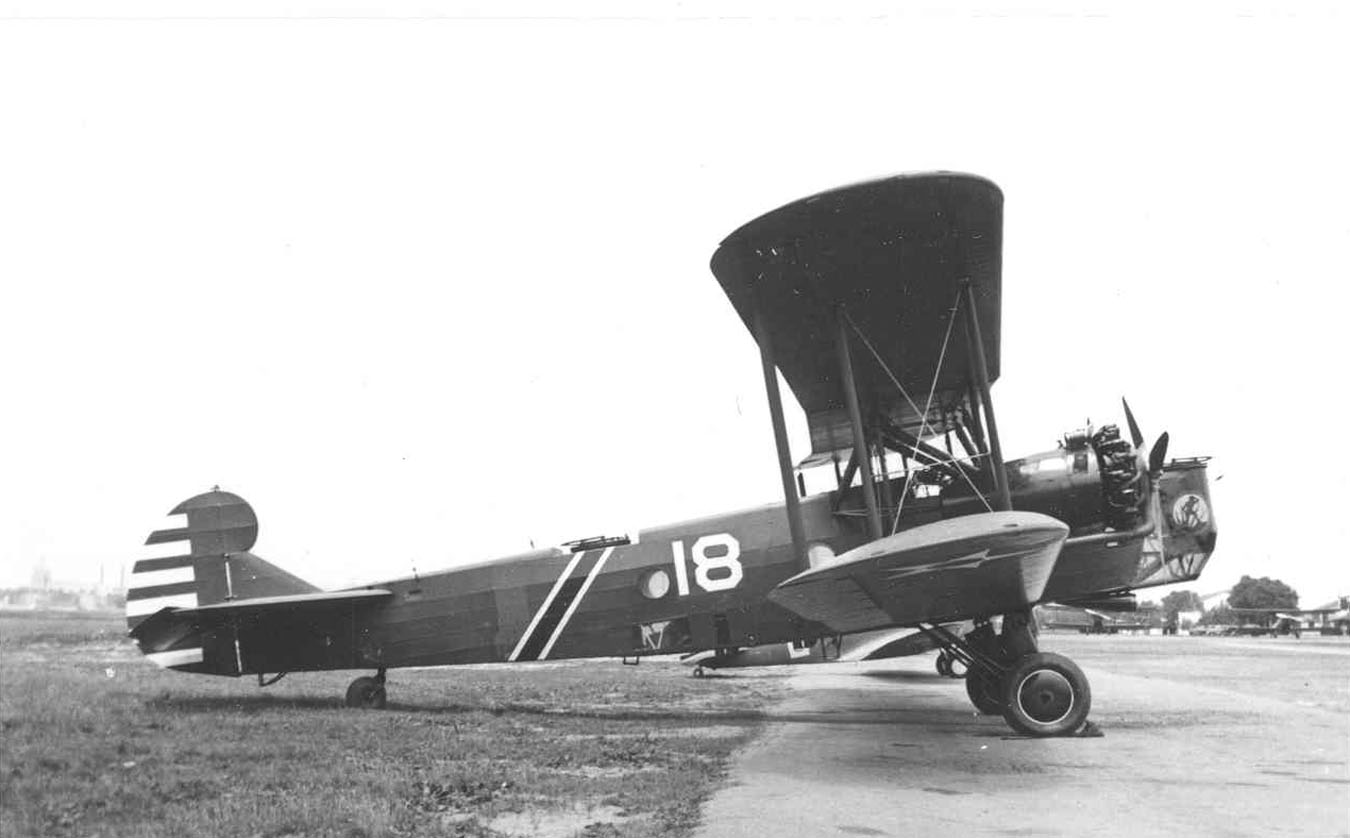
Keystone B-6A of 1st Bomb Squadron, 9th BG, 1935. The dual stripes on the fuselage denote the aircraft of the squadron commander.

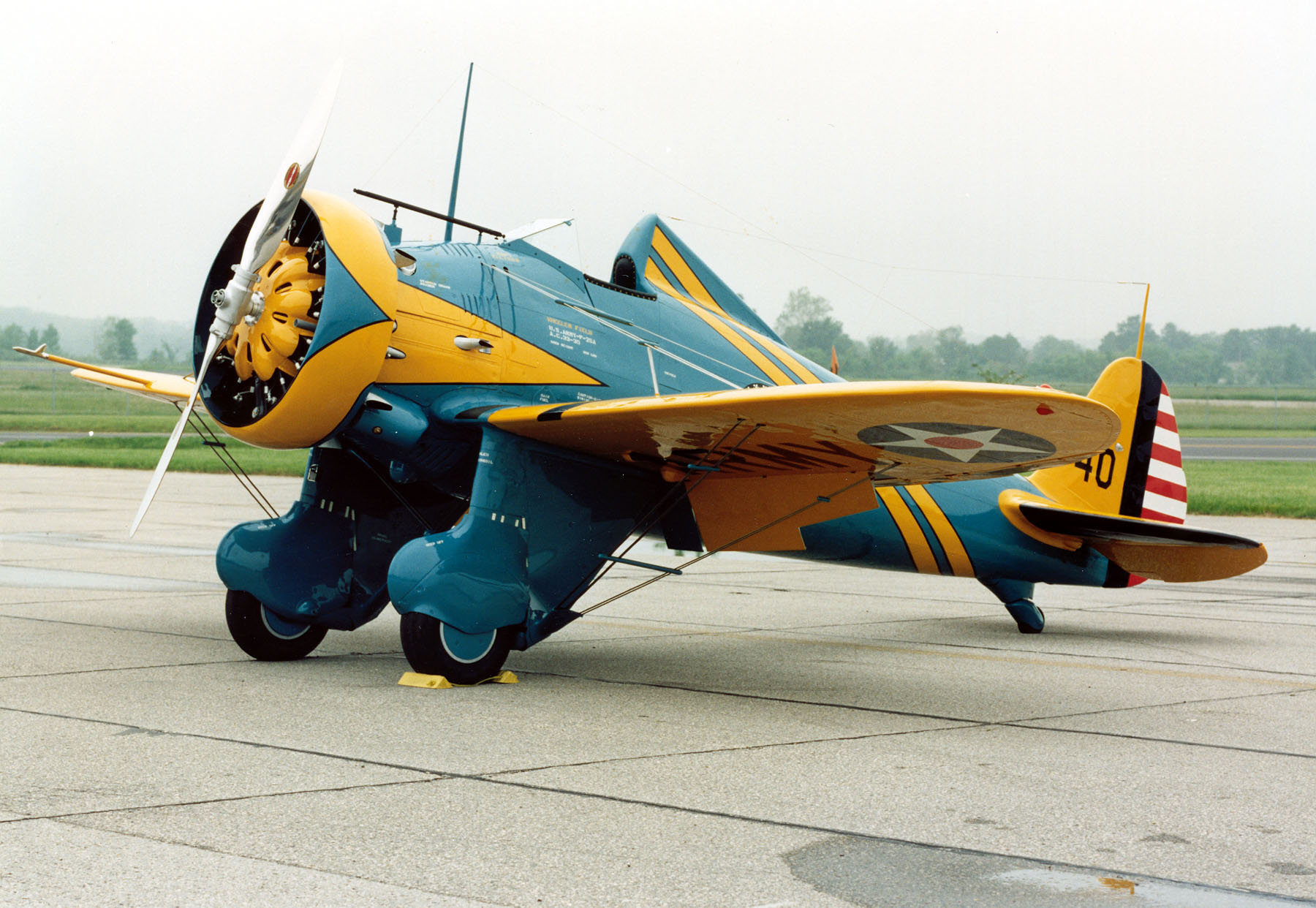
Boeing P-26A in livery of 19th Pursuit Squadron, 18th PG, Wheeler Field, Hawaii

Most pursuit fighters before 1935 were of the Curtiss P-1 Hawk (1926–1930) and Boeing P-12 (1929–1935) families, and before the 1934 introduction of the all-metal monoplane, most front-line bombers were canvas-and-wood variants of the radial engined Keystone LB-6 (60 LB-5A, LB-6 and LB-7 bombers) and B-3A (127 B-3A, B-4A, B-5, and B-6A bombers) designs. Between 1927 and 1934, the Curtiss O-1 Falcon was the most numerous of the 19 different types and series of observation craft and its A-3 variant the most numerous of the attack planes that fulfilled the observation/close support role designated by the General Staff as the primary mission of the Air Corps.

Transport aircraft used during the first ten years of the Air Corps were of largely trimotor design, such as the Atlantic-Fokker C-2 and the Ford C-3, and were procured in such small numbers (66 total) that they were doled out one airplane to a base. As their numbers and utility declined, they were replaced by a series of 50 twin-engine and single-engine small transports and used for staff duties. Pilot training was conducted between 1927 and 1937 in the Consolidated PT-3 trainer, followed by the Stearman PT-13 and variants after 1937.

By 1933 the Air Corps expanded to a tactical strength of 50 squadrons: 21 pursuit, 13 observation, 12 bombardment, and 4 attack. All were understrength in aircraft and men, particularly officers, which resulted in most being commanded by junior officers (commonly first lieutenants) (Note: An example is Ralph F. Stearley, who commanded the 13th Attack Squadron for four years as a 1st Lieutenant.) instead of by majors as authorized. The last open-cockpit fighter used by the Air Corps, the Boeing P-26 Peashooter, came into service in 1933 and bridged the gap between the biplane and more modern fighters.

The Air Corps was called upon in early 1934 to deliver mail in the wake of the Air Mail scandal, involving the United States Postmaster General and heads of the airlines. Despite an embarrassing performance that resulted from numerous crashes and 13 fatalities and was deemed a "fiasco" in the media, investigating boards in 1933–1934 (Note: The Drum Board was a panel of five generals formed in August 1933 by the General Staff to oppose recommendations by Air Corps planners for development and expansion to meet defense needs (Tate (1998) pp. 138–139), while the Baker Board was formed after the Air Mail scandal and had as its military members (who controlled the agenda) the five generals of the Drum Board (Tate pp. 143–145).) recommended organizational and modernization changes that again set the Air Corps on the path to autonomy and eventual separation from the Army. A force of 2,320 aircraft was recommended by the Drum Board, (Note: The Drum Board derived its figure as the number necessary to maintain 2,072 "serviceable" planes for its worst-case scenario, War Plan Red-Orange. War plans involving Great Britain ("Red") as an opponent were not officially excluded from United States war planning until January 1938.) and authorized by Congress in June 1936, but appropriations to build up the force were denied by the administration until 1939, when the probability of war became apparent. Instead, the Air Corps inventory actually declined to 855 total aircraft in 1936, a year after the creation of GHQ Air Force, which by itself was recommended to have a strength of 980.

The most serious fallout from the Air Mail fiasco was the retirement under fire of Major General Benjamin Foulois as Chief of Air Corps. Soon after the Roosevelt administration placed the blame on him for the Air Corps' failures, he was investigated by a congressional subcommittee alleging corruption in aircraft procurement. The matter resulted in an impasse between committee chairman William N. Rogers and Secretary of War George Dern before being sent to the Army's Inspector General, who ruled largely in favor of Foulois. Rogers continued to severely criticize Foulois through the summer of 1935, threatening future Air Corps appropriations, and despite public support by Dern for the embattled chief, the administration was close to firing Foulois for his perceived attitude as a radical airman and his public criticisms of the administration during the controversy. He retired in December 1935 for the good of the service.

The Roosevelt administration began a search for his replacement in September 1935, narrowing the choice to two of the three assistant chiefs, Henry Conger Pratt and Oscar Westover. Pratt appeared to have the superior credentials, but he had been in charge of aircraft procurement during the Foulois years and was looked upon warily by Dern as possibly being another Mitchell or Foulois. Westover was chosen because he was the philosophical opposite of the two insurgent airmen in all respects, being a "team player".

The open insurgency between 1920 and 1935 of airmen foreseeing a need for an independent air force in order to develop fully the potential of airpower had cost the careers of two of its near-legendary lights, Foulois and Mitchell, and nearly cost the reputation of two others, Pratt and Henry H. Arnold. In terms of the principle of civilian control of the military in peacetime, their tactics and behavior were clearly inappropriate. The political struggle had temporarily alienated supporters in Congress, had been counterproductive of the development of the Air Corps in the short run, and had hardened the opposition of an already antagonistic General Staff. But through their mistakes and repeated rebuffs, the airmen had learned what they were lacking: proof for the argument that the Air Corps could perform a unique mission—strategic bombardment—and the real threat of another world war would soon reverse their fortunes.

== Doctrinal development ==
=== Strategic bombardment in roles and missions ===
"The Naval Air Force will be based on the fleet and move with it as an important element in solving the primary missions confronting the fleet. The Army Air Forces will be land-based and employed as an essential element to the Army in the performance of its mission to defend the coasts at home and in our overseas possessions, thus assuring the fleet absolute freedom of action without any responsibility for coast defense."

— Gen. Douglas MacArthur, Adm. William V. Pratt, 7 January 1931

In March 1928, commenting on the lack of survivability in combat of his unit's Keystone LB-7 and Martin NBS-1 bombers, Lt. Col. Hugh J. Knerr, commander of the 2nd Bombardment Group at Langley Field, Virginia, recommended that the Air Corps adopt two types of all-metal monoplane bombers, a short-range day bomber and a long-range night bomber. Instructors at the Air Corps Tactical School (ACTS), also then at Langley, took the concept one step further in March 1930 by recommending that the types instead be light and heavy, the latter capable of long range carrying a heavy bomb load that could also be used during daylight.

The Air Corps in January 1931 "got its foot in the door" for developing a mission for which only it would have capability, while at the same time creating a need for technological advancement of its equipment. Chief of Naval Operations Admiral William V. Pratt wanted approval of his proposition that all naval aviation including land-based aircraft was by definition tied to carrier-based fleet operations. Pratt reached an agreement with new Army Chief of Staff Douglas MacArthur that the Air Corps would assume responsibility for coastal defense (traditionally a primary function of the Army but a secondary, wartime function of the Navy) beyond the range of the Army's Coast Artillery guns, ending the Navy's apparent duplication of effort in coastal air operations. The agreement, intended as a modification of the Joint Action statement on coastal defense issued in 1926, was not endorsed by the Joint Army-Navy Board (Note: The Joint Army-Navy Board was the rudimentary precursor of the Joint Chiefs of Staff.) and never had authority other than a personal agreement between the two heads of service. Though the Navy repudiated the statement when Pratt retired in 1934, the Air Corps clung to the mission, and provided itself with the basis for development of long-range bombers and creating new doctrine to employ them.

The formulation of theories of strategic bombing gave new impetus to the argument for an independent air force. Strategic or long-range bombardment was intended to destroy an enemy's industry and war-making potential, and only an independent service would have a free hand to do so. But despite what it perceived as "obstruction" from the War Department, much of which was attributable to a shortage of funds, the Air Corps made great strides during the 1930s. A doctrine emerged that stressed precision bombing of industrial targets by heavily armed long-range aircraft.

This doctrine resulted because of several factors. The Air Corps Tactical School moved in July 1931 to Maxwell Field, Alabama, where it taught a 36-week course for junior and mid-career officers that included military aviation theory. The Bombardment Section, under the direction of its chief, Major Harold L. George, became influential in the development of doctrine and its dissemination throughout the Air Corps. Nine of its instructors became known throughout the Air Corps as the "Bomber Mafia", eight of whom (including George) went on to be generals during World War II. Conversely, pursuit tacticians, primarily Capt. Claire Chennault, Chief of the school's Pursuit Section, found their influence waning because of repeated performance failures of pursuit aviation. Finally, the doctrine represented the Air Corps' attempt to develop autonomy from the General Staff, which enforced subordination of the air arm by limiting it to support of ground forces and defense of United States territory.

=== Technological advances in bombers ===
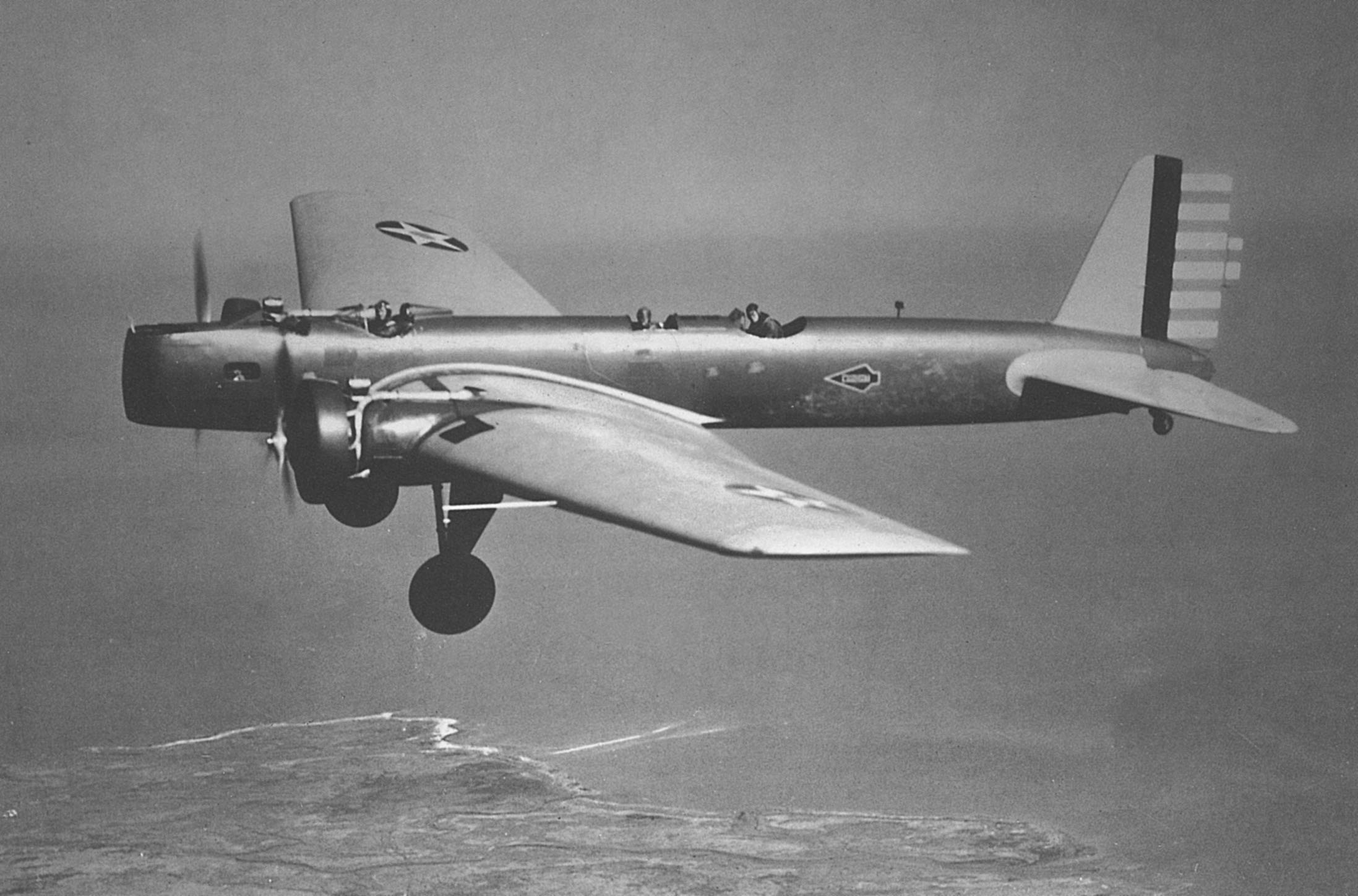
"Gear down" test flight of the Boeing Y1B-9 bomber in 1932. At the time it was faster than any existing pursuit plane.

New bomber types under development clearly outperformed new pursuit types, particularly in speed and altitude, then considered the primary defenses against interception. In both 1932 and 1933, large-scale maneuvers found fighters unable to climb to altitude quickly enough to intercept attacking B-9 and B-10 prototypes, a failure so complete that Westover, following the 1933 maneuvers, actually proposed elimination of pursuits altogether.

1933 was a pivotal year in the advancement of aviation technology in which the all-metal airplane came of age, "practically overnight" in the words of one historian, because of the availability of the first practical variable-pitch propeller. Coupled with "best weight" design of airframes, the controllable pitch propeller resulted in an immediate doubling of speeds and operating ranges without decreasing aircraft weights or increasing engine horsepower, exemplified by the civil Douglas DC-1 transport and the military Martin B-10 bomber.

The B-10 featured innovations that became standard internationally for the next decade: an all-metal low wing monoplane, closed cockpits, rotating gun turrets, retractable landing gear, internal bomb bay, high-lift devices and full engine cowlings. The B-10 proved to be so superior that as its 14 operational test models were delivered in 1934 they were fed into the Air Corps mail operation, and despite some glitches caused by pilot unfamiliarity with the innovations, (Note: Two YB-10s were landed with their landing gear still up, both by experienced aviators, one a major with 100 hours in aircraft with retractable gear. (Maurer 1987, p. 311)) were a bright spot. The first action to repair the damaged image of the Air Corps involved the movement of ten YB-10s from Bolling Field to Alaska, ostensibly for an airfield survey, but timed to coincide with the release of the Baker Board's report in July.

The successful development of the B-10 and subsequent orders for more than 150 (including its B-12 variant) continued the hegemony of the bomber within the Air Corps that resulted in a feasibility study for a 35-ton 4-engined bomber (the Boeing XB-15). While it was later found to be unsuitable for combat because the power of existing engines was inadequate for its weight, the XB-15 led to the design of the smaller Model 299, later to become the Boeing B-17 Flying Fortress, whose first flight was at the end of July 1935. By that time the Air Corps had two projects in place for the development of longer-ranged bombers, Project A for a bomber with a ferry range of 5,000 miles (8,000 km), and Project D, for one of a range of up to 10,000 miles (16,000 km). In June 1936 the Air Corps requested 11 B-15s and 50 B-17s for reinforcing hemispheric defense forces in Hawaii, Alaska, and Panama. The request was rejected on the basis that there were no strategic requirements for aircraft of such capabilities.

=== General Staff resistance to Air Corps doctrine ===
The Army and Navy, both cognizant of the continuing movement within the Air Corps for independence, cooperated to resist it. On 11 September 1935, the Joint Board, at the behest of the Navy and with the concurrence of MacArthur, issued a new "Joint Action Statement" that once again asserted the limited role of the Air Corps as an auxiliary to the "mobile Army" in all its missions, including coastal defense. The edict was issued with the intent of again shoving an upstart Air Corps back into its place. However, the bomber advocates interpreted its language differently, concluding that the Air Corps could conduct long-range reconnaissance, attack approaching fleets, reinforce distant bases, and attack enemy air bases, all in furthering its mission to prevent an air attack on America. (Note: The Joint Action Statement fostered a lack of inter-service cooperation on coastal defense that continued until the Japanese attack on Pearl Harbor. As late as 14 October 1941, CNO Adm. Harold Stark insisted that the "proper" role of Army aviation in coastal defense was support of Navy operations. (Shiner, "The Coming of the GHQ Air Force", p. 121))

A month later (15 October 1935), the General Staff released a revision of the doctrinal guide for the Air Corps, training regulation TR 440-15 Employment of the Air Forces of the Army. (Note: Since 1923 Army doctrine had been stated in Field Service Regulations, which were general in character, and Training Regulations, which stated combat principles for each combatant arm. TR 440-15 had been first issued on 26 January 1926 as Fundamental Principles for the Employment of the Air Service. Coincidentally, Col. William L. Mitchell resigned from the service the day following its issuance. This dichotomy of regulations and principles ended in 1939 with the creation of field manuals.) A year earlier MacArthur had changed TR 440-15 to clarify "the Air Corps's place in the scheme of national defense and ... (to do away with) ... misconceptions and interbranch prejudices." The General Staff characterized its latest revision as a "compromise" with airpower advocates, to mitigate public criticism of the Joint Action Statement, but the newest revision parroted the anti-autonomy conclusions of the Drum and Baker Boards, and reasserted its long-held position (and that of the Secretary Dern) (Note: Dern's characterization of the Air Corps' role in February 1934 as "subordinated like all other elements to whatever team it happens to accompany" leaves no doubt as to the Army's position about its purpose.) that auxiliary support of the ground forces was the primary mission of the Air Corps. TR 440-15 did acknowledge some doctrinal principles asserted by the ACTS (including the necessity of destroying an enemy's air forces and concentrating air forces against primary objectives) and recognized that future wars would probably entail some missions "beyond the sphere of influence of the Ground Forces" (strategic bombardment), but it did not attach any importance to prioritization of targets, weakening its effectiveness as doctrine. The Air Corps in general assented to the changes, as it did to other compromises of the period, as acceptable for the moment. TR 440-15 remained the doctrinal position of the Air Corps until it was superseded by the first Air Corps Field Manual, FM 1–5 Employment of Aviation of the Army, on 15 April 1940. (Note: In March 1939 the Secretary of War created an "Air Board" chaired by Arnold and instructed it to submit a recommendation for organization and doctrine of the Air Corps. Its report, submitted to Chief of Staff Marshall on 1 September 1939, represented an Army-wide perspective. It became the basis for FM 1–5, and recognized that the United States was then on the strategic defensive. Its view was conservative and "a considerable attenuation of air doctrine" as espoused by the ACTS. However, it did correct the omissions of TR 440-15 and reasserted that centralized control by an airman in any combat role was essential for efficiency. Ironically, Gen. Andrews had by then become Army G-3 and reported to Marshall that the manual "did not endorse the radical theory of air employment". FM 1–5 was followed by supplemental doctrine Air Corps Field Manuals FM 1–15 Tactics and Technique of Air Fighting (pursuit) on 9 September 1940, FM 1–10 Tactics and Technique of Air Attack (bombardment) on 20 November 1940, FM 1–20 Tactics and Technique of Air Reconnaissance and Observation on 10 February 1941, War Department Basic Field Manual FM 31–35 Aviation in Support of Ground Forces on 9 April 1942, and Army Air Forces Field Manual FM 1–75 Combat Orders on 16 June 1942. FM 1–5 was itself superseded after just three years following disputes over control of air power in North Africa by FM 100-20 Command and Employment of Air Power (Field Service Regulations) on 21 July 1943 in what many in the Army Ground Forces viewed as the Army Air Forces' "Declaration of Independence." (AGF Historical Study No. 35, p. 47))

In the fall of 1937, the Army War College's course on the use of airpower reiterated the General Staff position and taught that airpower was of limited value when employed independently. Using attaché reports from both Spain and Ethiopia, and endorsed by a senior Air Corps instructor, Col. Byron Q. Jones, (Note: Jones, an aviation pioneer and formerly a cavalry officer, was the rarest of Air Corps officers, a "true believer" in the General Staff doctrine. He was one of the few senior Air Corps officers never to have attended or instructed at the Air Corps Tactical School. Following his controversial endorsement, the War Department offered him a command with a temporary promotion to brigadier general. His autobiographical entry in the Cullum Register of USMA graduates, however, states he declined "because of desire of superiors to retain his services within (the) continental U.S." Jones remained at the Army War College with its temporary promotion to colonel until September 1939, then accepted a cavalry assignment and transferred from the Air Corps.) the course declared that the Flying Fortress concept had "died in Spain", and that airpower was useful mainly as "long range artillery." Air Corps officers in the G-3 Department of the General Staff pointed out that Jones' conclusions were inconsistent with the revised TR 440-15, but their views were dismissed by Deputy Chief of Staff Maj. Gen. Stanley Embick with the comment: "No doctrine is sacrosanct, and of all military doctrines, that of the Air Corps should be the last to be so regarded." (Note: Embick was formerly chief of the War Plans Division. In collaboration with Assistant Chief of Staff, G-4 (logistics) Brig. Gen. George R. Spalding, Embick was the driving force in minimizing all Air Corps R&D, squelching long-range bombers, and referring doctrinal disputes to the Joint Army-Navy Board for resolution. His influence ended the next year when he was replaced as Deputy Chief of Staff by George C. Marshall. (Greer 1985, p. 95))

At the same time, the General Staff ordered studies from all the service branches to develop drafts for the coming field manuals. The Air Corps Board, a function of the ACTS, submitted a draft in September 1938 that included descriptions of independent air operations, strategic air attacks, and air action against naval forces, all of which the General Staff rejected in March 1939. Instead, it ordered that the opening chapter of the Air Corps manual be a doctrinal statement developed by the G-3 that "left little doubt" that the General Staff's intention was "to develop and employ aviation in support of ground forces." The Air Corps Board, on the orders of Arnold, developed a secret study for "defense of the Monroe Doctrine" that recommended development of long-range, high altitude, high-speed aircraft for bombardment and reconnaissance to accomplish that defense.

The War Department, seeking to stifle procurement of the B-17 while belatedly recognizing that coordinated air-ground support had been long neglected, decided that it would order only two-engined "light" bombers in fiscal years 1939 through 1941. It also rejected further advancement of Project A, the development program for a very long range bomber. (Note: The rejection was by Secretary of War Woodring of a request by Westover in May 1938 that all funds remaining for the B-15 be applied to the development of a single Boeing Y1B-20, a design improvement of the B-15 with more powerful engines. Instead, the funds were diverted to buy more B-18s. (Greer 1985, p. 99)) In collaboration with the Navy, the Joint Board (whose senior member was Army Chief of Staff Gen. Malin Craig) on 29 June 1938 issued a ruling that it could foresee no use for a long-range bomber in future conflict. (Note: J.B. 349. The ruling also further blocked the Project A bomber by decreeing that there was no reconnaissance need for an aircraft with range beyond that of the B-17.) As a direct result, the last planned order of long-range bombers (67 B-17s) was cancelled by Craig (the funds were used to buy more light bombers instead) and a moratorium on further development of them was put into effect by restricting R&D funding to medium and light bombers. This policy would last less than a year, as it went against not only the trends of technological development, but against the geopolitical realities of coming war. (Note: The R&D restriction was rescinded in October 1938 following the Munich Conference, although the ban on buying more B-17s in FY 1940 and 1941 remained. (Greer 1985, p. 100)) In August 1939 the Army's research and development program for 1941 was modified with the addition of nearly five million dollars to buy five long-range bombers for experimental purposes, resulting on 10 November 1939 in the request by Arnold of the developmental program that would create the Boeing B-29 Superfortress, which was approved on 2 December.

Between 1930 and 1938 the Air Corps had obtained a mission in coastal defense that justified both the creation of a centralized strike force and the development of four-engined bombers, and over the resistance of the General Staff lobbied for another mission, strategic bombardment, with which it could persuasively argue for independence from the Army. The cost of the General Staff's resistance in terms of preparedness had been severe, however. Its policies had resulted in the acquisition of obsolete aircraft as first-line equipment, stifled design development in the private sector of better types, retarded the development of radar and ordnance, and handicapped training, doctrine, and offensive organization by reneging on commitments to acquire the B-17. "From October 1935 until 30 June 1939, the Air Corps requested 206 B-17's and 11 B-15's. Yet because of cancellations and reductions of these requests by the War Department, 14 four-engine planes were delivered to the air force up to the outbreak of World War II in September 1939."

=== GHQ Air Force ===
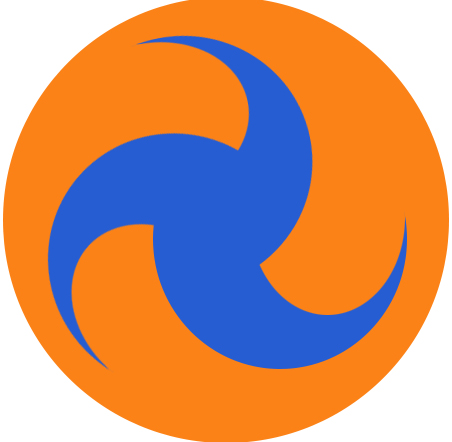
USAAF General Headquarters SSI 1935-1942

A major step toward creation of a separate air force occurred on 1 March 1935 with the activation of a centralized, air force-level command headed by an aviator answering directly to the Army Chief of Staff. Called the General Headquarters Air Force, the organization had existed in Army planning since 1924 as a subordinate element of Army General Headquarters, which would be activated to control all Army units in case of war mobilization. In anticipation of military intervention in Cuba in 1933, (Note: A coup styled "the revolt of the sergeants" seized the Cuban military and replaced a provisional government sponsored by the Roosevelt Administration with a junta. Although Roosevelt was disposed to intervention as a last resort, warnings that he intended to intervene under the Treaty of 1903 were made to the revolutionaries.) the headquarters had been created on 1 October but not staffed. (Note: Four ground force field army headquarters were established at the same time.) The Drum Board of 1933 had first endorsed the concept, but as a means of reintegrating the Air Corps into control by the General Staff, in effect reining it in.

Among the recommendations of the Baker Board, established in the wake of the Air Mail scandal, was that the proposals of the Drum Board be adopted: an increase in strength to 2,320 aircraft and establishment of GHQ Air Force as a permanent peacetime tactical organization, both to ameliorate the pressures for a separate air force and to exploit emerging capabilities in airpower. In the absence of a general headquarters (i.e. peacetime), GHQ Air Force would report to the General Staff. The War Plans Division of the Army reacted to the recommendations of the Baker Board by insisting that men and modern equipment for seven army divisions (Note: These divisions were specifically four infantry and three horse cavalry.) be procured before any increase in the Air Corps was begun, and opposed any immediate attempt to bring the Air Corps up to the 1,800 plane-strength first authorized in 1926, for fear of antagonizing the Navy. (Note: Brig. Gen. Charles E. Kilbourne, at the core of the General Staff's disputes with the Air Corps and supervisor of the revision of TR 440-15, authored these suggestions. He also freely espoused his opinion that expansion of the Air Corps was primarily a "selfish" means of promotion for aviators at the expense of the rest of the Army. Although rapid promotion of youthful airmen became a cliche in World War II, during the inter-war years Air Service/Air Corps promotion lagged notoriously behind that of the other branches. On the 669-name promotion list for colonel in 1922, on which Kilbourne had been 76th, the first airman (later Chief of Air Corps James Fechet) had been 354th. The 1,800 aircraft goal was never reached because of General Staff resistance to the "five-year plan", but the War Plans Division did deem it "acceptable" for implementation of War Plan Red-Orange. The Air Corps, based on studies of joint exercises held at Key West, Florida, found the number dangerously inadequate, concluding that 4,459 aircraft was the minimum needed to defend the United States against air attack in the event of War Plan Red-Orange.) President Roosevelt approved an open-ended program to increase strength to 2,320 aircraft (albeit without any proviso for funding) in August 1934, and Secretary Dern approved the activation of GHQ Air Force in December 1934.

GHQ Air Force took control of all combat air units in the United States from the jurisdiction of corps area commanders, where it had resided since 1920, and organized them operationally into a strike force of three wings. (Note: The wings were organized both functionally and geographically. The 1st was both the bombardment and the Pacific wing, the 2d the pursuit and Atlantic wing, and the 3rd the attack and Gulf Coast wing.) The GHQ Air Force remained small in comparison to European air forces. On its first day of existence, the command consisted of 60 bombers, 42 attack aircraft, 146 pursuits, and 24 transports, amounting to 40% of strength in the tables of organization. Administratively it organized the forces into four geographical districts (which later became the first four numbered air forces) that paralleled the four field army headquarters created in 1933.

The General Staff perceived its creation as a means of lessening Air Corps autonomy, not increasing it, however, and GHQ Air Force was a "coordinate component" equal to the Air Corps, not subject to its control. The organizations reported separately to the Chief of Staff, the Air Corps as the service element of the air arm, and GHQAF as the tactical element. However, all GHQ Air Force's members, along with members of units stationed overseas and under the control of local ground commanders, remained part of the Air Corps. This dual status and division of authority hampered the development of Air Corps for the next six years, as it had the Air Service during World War I, and was not overcome until the necessity of expanding the force occurred with the onset of World War II. The commanding general of GHQ Air Force, Maj. Gen. Frank M. Andrews, clashed philosophically with Westover over the direction in which the air arm was heading, adding to the difficulties, with Andrews in favor of autonomy and Westover not only espousing subordination to the Army chain of command but aggressively enforcing his prohibitions of any commentary opposed to current policy. Andrews, by virtue of being out from Westover's control, had picked up the mantle of the radical airmen, and Westover soon found himself on "the wrong side of history" as far as the future of the Air Corps was concerned. (Note: Andrews and Westover were both 1906 graduates of West Point, with Andrews graduating one position higher in class standings. Andrews had originally been a cavalryman, and had married into the inner circles in Washington, while Westover, a former infantry officer with the unfortunate nickname of "Tubby," had pursued his career with bulldog-like determination. He had not learned to fly until he was 40 years of age and was a reluctant participant in Washington's social environs, usually depending on his assistant Hap Arnold to fulfill the protocol role. As early as 5 May 1919, in a memo to Director of Air Service Charles Menoher for whom he was assistant executive officer, Westover had demonstrated a loyalty to subordination, urging the relief of Billy Mitchell from his position as Third Assistant Executive (S-3) of the Air Service—along with his division heads—if their advocacy of positions not conforming to Army policy did not cease.)

Lines of authority were also blurred as GHQ Air Force controlled only combat flying units within the continental United States. The Air Corps was responsible for training, aircraft development, doctrine, and supply, while the ground forces corps area commanders still controlled installations and the personnel manning them. An example of the difficulties this arrangement imposed on commanders was that while the commander of GHQ Air Force was responsible for the discipline of his command, he had no court martial authority over his personnel, which was retained by the corps area commander. Base commanders of Air Corps installations reported to as many as four different higher echelons. (Note: The base commander of Selfridge Field was responsible for various aspects of administration to the CG of GHQAF, the Chief of the Air Corps, the commander of the Sixth Corps Area, and the Chief of the Air Materiel Division.) The issue of control of bases was ameliorated in 1936 when GHQAF bases were exempted from corps area authority on recommendation of the Inspector General's Department, but in November 1940 it was restored again to Corps Area control when Army General Headquarters was activated.

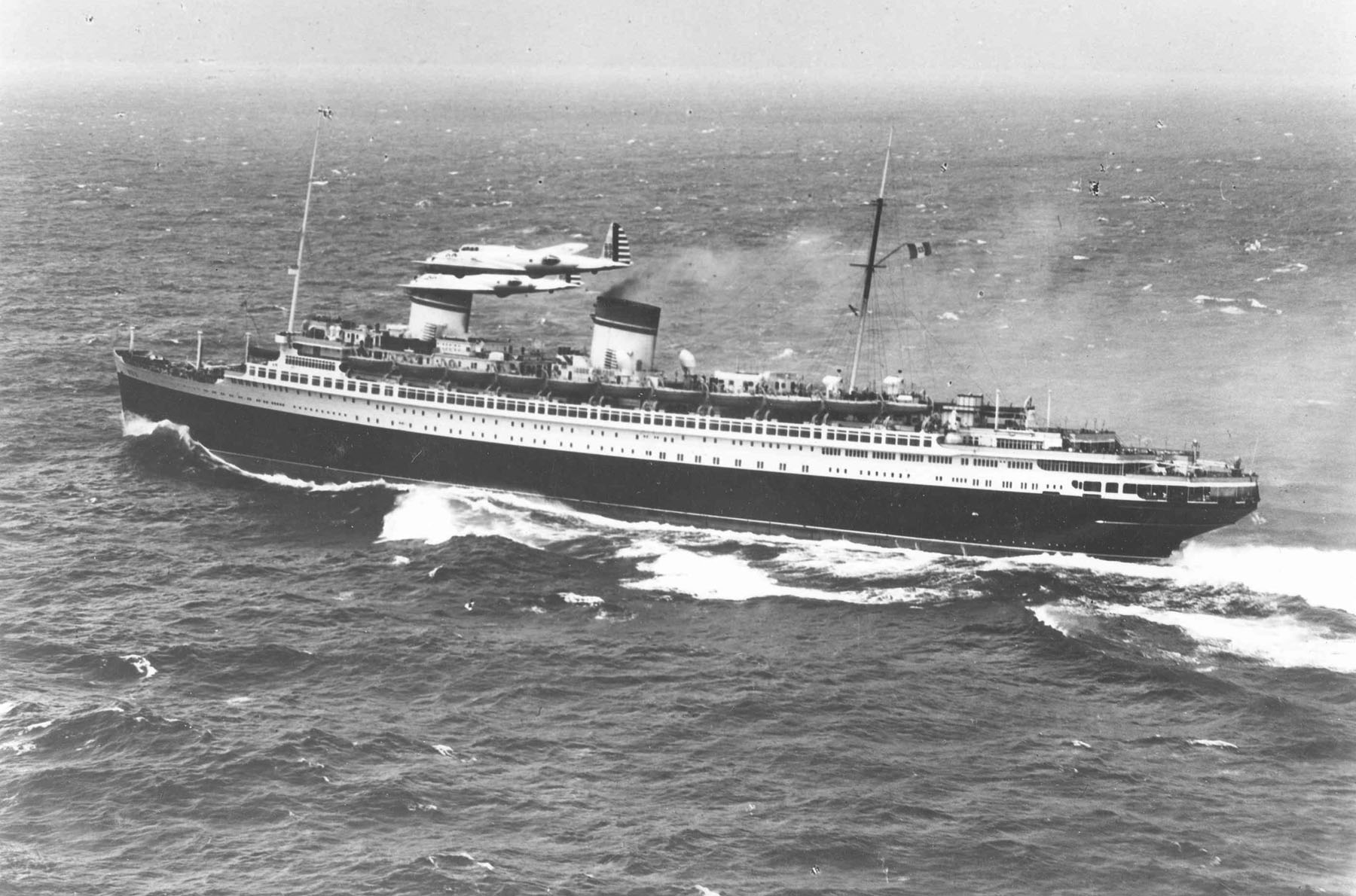
Interception of the Rex. The navigator for the mission was 1st Lt. Curtis LeMay.

In January 1936, the Air Corps contracted with Boeing for thirteen Y1B-17 Flying Fortress prototypes, enough to equip one squadron for operational testing and a thirteenth aircraft for stress testing, with deliveries made from January to August 1937. The cost of the aircraft disturbed Secretary of War Harry Woodring, who denied requests for further purchases, so that although the air arm embraced strategic bombing as its primary doctrine after the creation of GHQ Air Force, by 1938 there were still only thirteen strategic bombers on hand. On 18 March 1938 Secretary Woodring implemented a plan that would have included the purchase of 144 four-engine bombers but approval was reversed in July when the moratorium against the long-range bomber program was imposed by the Joint Board. (Note: The Woodring Plan (based on the "Balanced Air Corps Program" developed after a two-year War Department study) was another "five-year plan" that called for adding 1,094 aircraft: 144 four-engine bombers, 266 two-engine bombers, 259 attack aircraft, and 425 pursuits, to begin in FY 1940 (July 1939). It was supported by both Andrews and Westover.) The purchase of 67 B-17s (five squadrons) in FY 1940 as an increment of the Woodring program, using carryover funds, was cancelled by Craig.

The moratorium also resulted from the enmity of the Navy incurred by the Air Corps on 12 May 1938 when it widely publicized the interception of the Italian ocean liner Rex by three B-17s while it was 610 nautical miles (1,100 km) offshore of New York City. Possibly under pressure from the Navy, Craig placed a limit of 100 nautical miles (190 km) on all future offshore flights by the Army. The services together issued a revised Joint Action statement in November reasserting that the mission of the Air Corps in coastal defense was only for supporting the Navy if called upon to do so, while simultaneously authorizing for the Navy the long-range shore-based coastal patrol mission denied the Air Corps. Westover, who stridently opposed cancellation of the Woodring program, was killed in an air crash on 21 September 1938 and was succeeded by Arnold.

== Modernization and expansion of the force ==
=== New aircraft ===
The Air Corps tested and employed a profusion of pursuit, observation, and bomber aircraft during its 15-year history. The advent of the new generation of monoplanes and the emergence of strategic bombardment doctrine led to many designs in the mid and late 1930s that were still in use when the United States entered World War II. Among the key technology items developed were oxygen and cabin pressurization systems, engine superchargers (systems essential for high-altitude combat), advanced radio communication systems, such as VHF radios, and the Norden bombsight.

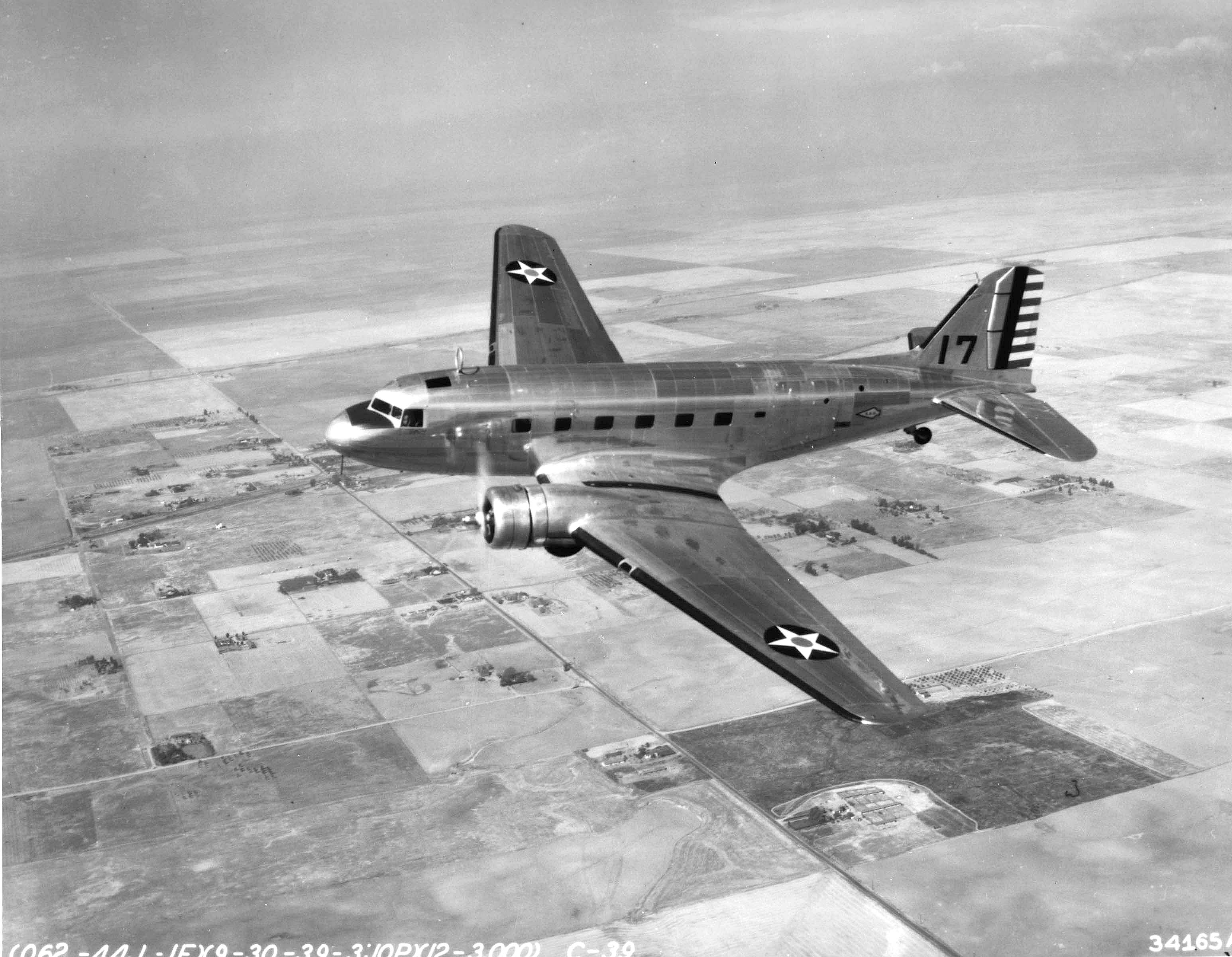
Douglas C-39 transport

As a further consequence of the Air Mail scandal, the Baker Board reviewed the performance of Air Corps aircraft and recognized that civilian aircraft were far superior to planes developed solely to Air Corps specifications. Following up on its recommendation, the Air Corps purchased and tested a Douglas DC-2 as the XC-32, which subsequently became the flying headquarters of Gen. Andrews. The DC-2 so exceeded Air Corps specifications that 17 were purchased under the designation C-33 to equip the first permanent transport unit, the 10th Transport Group, (Note: This group had operated as the provisional "1st Transport Group" between 1932 and 1937, with a squadron serving each of the Air Corps' four air depots. (Craven and Cate, Vol. 7 p. 4)) activated in June 1937 at Patterson Field in Ohio. In 1939 the Air Corps recognized that it might soon require large numbers of modern air transports for use in war and purchased 35 DC-2/DC-3 hybrids, designated the C-39. After the fall of France, the Air Corps in September 1940 ordered 200 untried and unproven Curtiss C-46 Commandos from Curtiss-Wright and 545 Douglas C-47 Skytrains, the forerunner of the more than 10,000 C-47s and related variants that served in World War II.

Even with the doctrine of strategic bombardment as its priority, the Air Corps belatedly sought to modernize its tactical combat force under GHQ Air Force, bringing into service the Northrop A-17 and Douglas B-18 Bolo in 1936, the Seversky P-35 in 1937, and the Curtiss P-36 in 1938. All of these aircraft were obsolete by the time they came into service, and the outbreak of war in Europe spurred development of more capable types. By October 1940, over a year before the United States was drawn into the war, every piston-driven single-seat fighter eventually used by the USAAF during World War II was in flight test except the P-47. However, the press of the enormous tasks confronting the Air Corps and the primacy of strategic bombing doctrine meant that development of a long-range capability for these new single-engined fighters was not undertaken until combat losses of bombers forced the issue.

Notable fighters developed during the late 1930s and early 1940s were the Bell P-39 Airacobra (first flown April 1938), Curtiss P-40 Warhawk (October 1938), Lockheed P-38 Lightning (January 1939), North American P-51 Mustang (October 1940), and Republic P-47 Thunderbolt (May 1941). Technological development of fighters occurred so rapidly that by December 1941 both the P-39 and P-40 were approaching obsolescence, even though both had been in production less than 18 months. Bombers developed during this period were the Douglas A-20 Havoc (first flown October 1938), North American B-25 Mitchell (January 1939), Consolidated B-24 Liberator (December 1939), and Martin B-26 Marauder (November 1940). Except for the B-24, P-47, and P-51, all of these had production deliveries that began before the AAF came into being in June 1941. Three other long-range bombers began development during this period, though only mock-ups were produced before World War II: the B-29 (study begun in 1938), the Consolidated B-32 Dominator (June 1940), and the Convair B-36 Peacemaker (April 1941). (Note: The B-36 fulfilled the requirements of Project D, the ultra-range bomber envisioned by Air Corps planners in 1935 but rejected by the War Department in 1938.)

=== Expansion of the Air Corps ===
In a special message to Congress on 12 January 1939, (Note: Arnold called this speech the "Magna Carta of airpower".) President Roosevelt advised that the threat of a new war made the recommendations of the Baker Board inadequate for American defense and requested approval of a "minimum 3,000-plane increase" for the Air Corps. (Note: Roosevelt's plans were more far-reaching than the speech indicates. At a confidential and historic conference in the White House in late 1938, Roosevelt met with Secretary of the Treasury Henry Morgenthau; WPA Chief Harry L. Hopkins; Solicitor General Robert H. Jackson; Secretary of War Woodring; Secretary of the Navy Charles Edison; General Counsel of the Treasury Herman Oliphant; Chief of Naval Operations Adm. Harold R. Stark; Craig; Marshall; and Arnold. He outlined a vigorous and singular call for 10,000 aircraft, but was persuaded by advisers to cut back the number for political reasons. The date of this conference is in dispute. Arnold, from the notes he made on a manila envelope, stated in Global Mission (p. 177, with which Coffey agrees) that it took place on 28 September while Neville Chamberlain was preparing to return to Germany to complete the Munich Agreement. Other historians, including Gen. John W. Huston, editor of American Airpower Comes of Age: General Henry H. "Hap" Arnold's World War II Diaries, and Mark Skinner Watson, in the Army's official history Chief of Staff: Prewar Plans and Preparations (United States Army in World War II series), date the meeting as 14 November. Huston asserts that the Navy was pointedly excluded from the conference and argues that a number of White House "crisis" conferences were held in October and November, most without written record, and that Arnold confused them, inserting the date (in pencil on an otherwise ink record) in his notes after-the-fact (Huston, Vol. I, pp. 120–121, note 216). Watson indicates that only Roosevelt's "naval aides" represented the Navy (p. 137). Coffey argues that beginning with Roosevelt's weekly press conference of 14 October, the president issued public and private statements that indicated his Air Corps expansion plans were already well underway. William Goss, in his summary for Army Air Forces in World War II, uses 14 November, but concedes that expansion plans were well underway before November, and that Arnold was possibly correct. Greer (The Development of Air Doctrine in the Army Air Arm, 1917–1941) agrees with Arnold and Coffey (p. 100). Because both dates are marked by notable events involving Nazi Germany (the U.S. broke diplomatic relations with Germany on 14 November), the actual date remains unresolved.) On 3 April 1939, Congress allocated the $300 million requested by Roosevelt for expansion of the Air Corps, half of which was dedicated to purchasing planes to raise the inventory from 2,500 to 5,500 airplanes, and the other half for new personnel, training facilities, and bases. Orders for B-17s, which had been held in abeyance since June 1938, resumed in the summer of 1939 with incremental deliveries of 39 B-17Bs in 1939–40, 18 B-17Cs in 1940, and 42 B-17Ds in the first quarter of 1941. (Note: 20 additional B-17Cs were delivered Lend-Lease to the RAF under the designation "Fortress I" in 1941.) The first large order for heavy bomber production, 512 combat-capable B-17Es, was placed in July 1940. (Note: A shortage of critical materials and insufficient skilled labor delayed production, which did not begin until April 1941. The first deliveries of the B-17E to the AAF began in November 1941, five months later than scheduled. Its successor, the B-17F, followed less than six months later however and was the primary AAF bomber in its first year of combat operations.)

In June 1939 the Kilner Board (Note: The Kilner Board, appointed by Arnold, was chaired by Assistant Chief of the Air Corps Brig. Gen. Walter G. "Mike" Kilner, a veteran pursuit pilot and proponent of an independent Air Force.) recommended several types of bombers needed to fulfill the Air Corps mission that included aircraft having tactical radii of both 2,000 and 3,000 miles (revised in 1940 to 4,000). Chief of Staff Craig, long an impediment to Air Corps ambitions but nearing retirement, came around to the Air Corps viewpoint after Roosevelt's views became public. Likewise, the War Department General Staff reversed itself and concurred in the requirements, ending the brief moratorium on bomber development and paving the way for work on the B-29.

Over the winter of 1938–1939, Arnold transferred a group of experienced officers headed by Lt. Col. Carl A. Spaatz to his headquarters as an unofficial air staff (Note: The service was not authorized an official air staff until creation of the Army Air Forces in June 1941.) to lay out a plan that would increase the Air Corps to 50,000 men by June 1941. The expansion program of the Air Corps was characterized by repeated upward revision of goals for increasing aircraft production, combat unit totals, the training of new personnel, and construction of new bases. New combat groups were created by detaching cadres from the existing 15 Regular groups to provide the core of the new units, with each older group providing the basis for an average of three new groups. Graduates of an expanded flight training program filled out the new groups and replaced the experienced personnel transferred from the older groups, resulting in a steady decline in the overall level of experience in the operational units. In essence, groups "self-trained" to proficiency standards set by training directives from the GHQAF. Unable to keep pace with the revised programs for expansion of combat groups, unit tactical training for all groups suffered from a shortage of equipment (particularly combat aircraft), an unavoidable preoccupation with administrative details during organization, and a lack of training facilities, especially bombing and gunnery ranges, leaving a "vast gap between the desired status of training in combat units and their actual status immediately prior to ... Pearl Harbor."

The initial 25-Group Program for air defense of the hemisphere, developed in April 1939, called for 50,000 men (12,000 pilots). Its ten new combat groups were activated on 1 February 1940. (Note: These were the 11th, 22nd, 25th and 29th Bomb Groups; 27th, 31st, 35th, 36th, and 37th Pursuit Groups; and the 28th Composite Group. Of the bomb groups, all but the 22nd were intended to be B-17 units.) Following the successful German invasion of France and the Low Countries in May 1940, a 54-Group Program was approved on 12 July, (Note: Under a program called the First Aviation Objective, the plan called for 4006 combat aircraft, including 498 long-range bombers in 14 groups, as well as a substantial increase in pursuit planes and units.) although funding approval could not keep pace and only 25 additional groups were activated on 15 January 1941. An 84-Group Program, with an eventual goal of 400,000 men by 30 June 1942, was approved on 14 March 1941, although not publicly announced until 23 October 1941. (Note: The original goals of the Second Aviation Objective were 84 combat groups; 7,799 tactical aircraft; and the annual addition of 30,000 pilots and 100,000 technical personnel.) In addition to unit training and funding problems, these programs were hampered by delays in acquiring the new infrastructure necessary to support them, sites for which had to be identified, negotiated and approved before construction. The General Staff again was unwilling to assign any of this work to the Air Corps, and instead detailed it to the overtaxed Quartermaster Corps. When the QMC failed to put new air bases in place in either an efficient or timely manner, the Corps of Engineers was then assigned the task, although it continued to implement the policies already in place. (Note: The acquisition boards put together by the General Staff were hampered by their total unfamiliarity with Air Corps needs, a lack of instructions from a General Staff also unfamiliar with and disinterested in AC requirements, and the slowness of the boards themselves in submitting their reports. The Air Corps estimated that the 54-group program was set back two months by the failures. (Craven and Cate Vol. 6, pp. 134–136))

By the time the Europeans went to war in September 1939, the Americans first expansion lagged so distantly in relation to its goals in manpower and tactical aircraft that Andrews described the Air Corps as a "fifth rate air force." Of its 1,500 combat aircraft, only 800 were rated as first-line, 700 of which became obsolete by December 1941. (Note: Craven and Cate, Vol. 6, pp. 173–174) By comparison, the RAF had 1,750 first-line aircraft and the German Luftwaffe 3,750. Moreover, the Luftwaffe had more personnel on the staffs of its headquarters and air ministry than were in the entire Air Corps (26,000). The first-line aircraft that would soon be considered obsolete were the B-18, A-17, and P-36. The only first-line aircraft in 1939 that remained so during World War II was the B-17, and it had to be significantly modernized before it was combat-capable.

The acceleration of the expansion programs resulted in an Air Corps of 156 installations of all types and 100,000 men by the end of 1940. Twenty civilian flight schools and eight technical training schools were contracted to provide additional training facilities, and on 10 August 1940, Pan American Airways was contracted to provide meteorological and navigation training at Coral Gables, Florida, until military schools could be established.

The first delivery of B-17Es took place in November 1941. Two-thirds of all Air Corps officers were second lieutenants whose flying experience consisted of their flight training. The Air Corps had 17 major installations and four depots, and most of its 76 airfields were co-located at civil airports or were small strips on Army posts. (Note: The 21 major bases were Barksdale, Bolling, Brooks, Chanute, Hamilton, Kelly, Langley, Lowry, March, Maxwell, McChord, Mitchel, Moffett, Randolph, Scott, Selfridge, and Wright Fields, and the Fairfield, Middletown, Sacramento, and San Antonio Air Depots.)

Procurement of aircraft remained a significant problem for the Air Corps until the eve of war, because of diversion of production to the Allies. On 16 May 1940, with the fall of France imminent, President Roosevelt delivered an address to Congress calling for a supplemental appropriation of nearly a billion dollars and the manufacture of 50,000 aircraft a year for the armed forces (36,500 of them for the Air Corps). Eighteen months later, in November 1941 (immediately before the U.S. entered the war), the AAF still had only 3,304 combat aircraft (only 1,024 overseas), and 7,024 non-combat aircraft, of which 6,594 were trainers. Its command staff increased in October 1940 to 24 with the addition of 15 new general officer billets. (Note: The 15 general officer billets consisted of four major generals, and eleven brigadier generals. In addition, the commanding general of GHQAF was promoted to lieutenant general. Only four Air Corps officers achieved the permanent rank of brigadier general before the AAF was created, and only two of those (Arnold, who was the last of the four, and Andrews) still had air force duties.) By June 1941, when the Air Corps became part of the AAF, it had 33 general officers, including four serving in observer roles to the Royal Air Force.

== Dissolution of the Air Corps ==
=== Unity of Command difficulties ===
Arnold, at the direction of President Roosevelt in January 1939, oversaw an expansion of the Air Corps that doubled it in size from 15 to 30 groups by the end of 1940. The separation of the combat organization (GHQ Air Force) from the logistic organization (Air Corps) created serious problems of coordination nearly identical to the Division of Military Aeronautics/Bureau of Aircraft Production dual-authority mess of World War I. In March 1939, with the replacement of Andrews as commander of GHQ Air Force by Maj. Gen. Delos C. Emmons, Arnold was nominally assigned to "supervise" the tactical force but this did not resolve the divisions in command. On 5 October 1940, Arnold drew up a proposal to reorganize the air arm along functional lines, creating an air staff, unifying the various organizations under one commander, and giving it autonomy with the ground and supply forces—a plan which was eventually adopted in March 1942—and submitted it to Chief of Staff George C. Marshall, but it was immediately opposed by the General Staff in all respects.

Instead, the two organizations were separated again by a directive from Marshall on 19 November 1940. Army General Headquarters was activated (more than five years after the activation of "its" air force) and GHQ AF placed under it, even though Army GHQ had been activated as a training organization. Its logistical and training structure were again out of its hands, this time under the direct control of the chief of staff, and its airfields again came under control of the corps commanders. Maj. Gen. George H. Brett, acting Chief of the Air Corps, denounced the plan as "disastrous in war". The problems already existing due to the lack of unity of command were exacerbated by the assignment of GHQ Air Force to Army GHQ. Emmons, who had begun his tour junior to Arnold, was promoted to lieutenant general to make him equal to the commanders of the field armies also controlled by Army GHQ. This forced him to report to and act under an inferior in rank (both Arnold and Brett were major generals).

As a compromise on all these issues, Marshall made Arnold "Acting Deputy Chief of Staff for Air." Although the Air Corps found the compromise unsatisfactory, this provisional position on the general staff did enable him to coordinate the two sections of the air arm until the organizational problems were repaired. Even in the short run, however, coordination proved to be no substitute for unity of command.

=== Creation of the Army Air Forces ===
In the spring of 1941, the combat successes of the British Royal Air Force and the German Luftwaffe under centralized control made clear that the fragmenting of authority in the American air arm had resulted in a dangerous lack of clear channels of command. The planning agreement, ABC-1 (arising from the secret U.S.–British Staff Conference in early 1941) called for sustained air offensives against the axis powers, countering the long-held argument that the Air Corps had no wartime mission except support of ground forces, the War Department revised Army Regulation 95-5 on 20 June in an attempt to end the divisions without legislative intervention by Congress. In creating the Army Air Forces with the Air Corps and the Air Force Combat Command (a redesignation of General Headquarters Air Force) as its major components, the War Department also authorized an Air Staff to manage planning and execution of expansion of the air arm and named Arnold as Chief of the Army Air Forces. It did not, however, end the dual chain of command difficulties, as air units of Air Force Combat Command still reported to Army GHQ as well as Headquarters AAF. Two further attempts by Arnold to implement his reorganization were again rejected by the WDGS in October and November.

At this stage, support of airpower in public opinion reached unprecedented highs, increasing pressures from outside the military for an independent air arm with representation in the cabinet. (Note: The popularity of the concept is reflected in the advocacy by candidate Wendell Willkie during the 1940 presidential campaign for a Department of Defense and an independent Air Force. (Craven and Cate, Vol. 6, p. 17)) Arnold made a decision to postpone any attempts to exploit the opportunity to push for an independent Air Force. Assured of a free hand by Marshall, Arnold thought that it would "be a serious mistake to change the existing setup" in the midst of the crucial expansion effort, which in less than five years would be more than 100 times its June 1939 size in personnel (much of it highly trained technically) alone. By November, however, the division of authority within the Army as a whole caused by the activation of Army GHQ prompted Marshall to assert that he had "the poorest command post in the Army." Defense commands, particularly those affecting air defense, had in Marshall's words showed a "disturbing failure to follow through on orders." Confronted with Marshall's dissatisfaction with Army GHQ, the General Staff reversed its opposition. Marshall appointed an Air Corps officer, Brig. Gen. Joseph T. McNarney, to chair a "War Department Reorganization Committee" within the War Plans Division, using Arnold's plan as a blueprint.

Based on the recommendations of McNarney's committee, Roosevelt issued Executive Order 9082, which changed Arnold's title to Commanding General, Army Air Forces effective 9 March 1942, making him co-equal with the commanding generals of the other components of the Army of the United States. On that date, War Department Circular 59 formalized the changes, abolishing Army GHQ and organizing the Army into three autonomous components: the Army Air Forces, the Army Ground Forces, and the Services of Supply, each with a commanding general reporting to the Chief of Staff. The Office of Chief of Air Corps (OCAC) was abolished (as was Air Force Combat Command) and the functions of the Air Corps transferred to the AAF, reducing the status of the Air Corps to a combat arm classification. (Note: Infantry and the other combat arms also had their chiefs abolished and functions transferred to the Army Ground Forces.)

The Congress did not disestablish the Army Air Corps as a combat arm until 26 July 1947, when the National Security Act of 1947 (61 Stat. 502) became law. Most members of the Army Air Forces also remained members of the Air Corps. In May 1945, 88 percent of officers serving in the Army Air Forces were commissioned in the Air Corps, while 82 percent of enlisted members assigned to AAF units and bases had the Air Corps as their combat arm branch.

== Organization of the Air Corps ==
=== Army Air Corps, 1 March 1935 ===
This list of units is a snapshot of the Air Corps on the date of activation of the General Headquarters Air Force. Except for the assignment of four reconnaissance (formerly observation) squadrons to the 1st and 2nd Wings in September 1936 for attachment to their heavy bombardment groups, (Note: The 1st Wing's 38th RS was attached to the 19th BG and the 88th RS to the 7th BG. The 2nd Wing's 18th RS was attached to the 9th BG and the 21st RS to the 2nd BG. The 9th Group's 14th BS and 2nd Group's 54th BS, neither of which had operational duties, were inactivated at the same time.) and the May 1937 exchange of the 12th Observation Group (inactivated) for the 10th Transport Group (activated), the organization of the Air Corps shown here remained essentially unchanged until activation of the first expansion groups on 1 February 1940.

==== General Headquarters Air Force ====
(Maj. Gen. Frank M. Andrews, Langley Field, Virginia)

21st Airship Group, Scott Field, Illinois

9th Airship Squadron, Scott Field
19th Airship Squadron, Langley Field

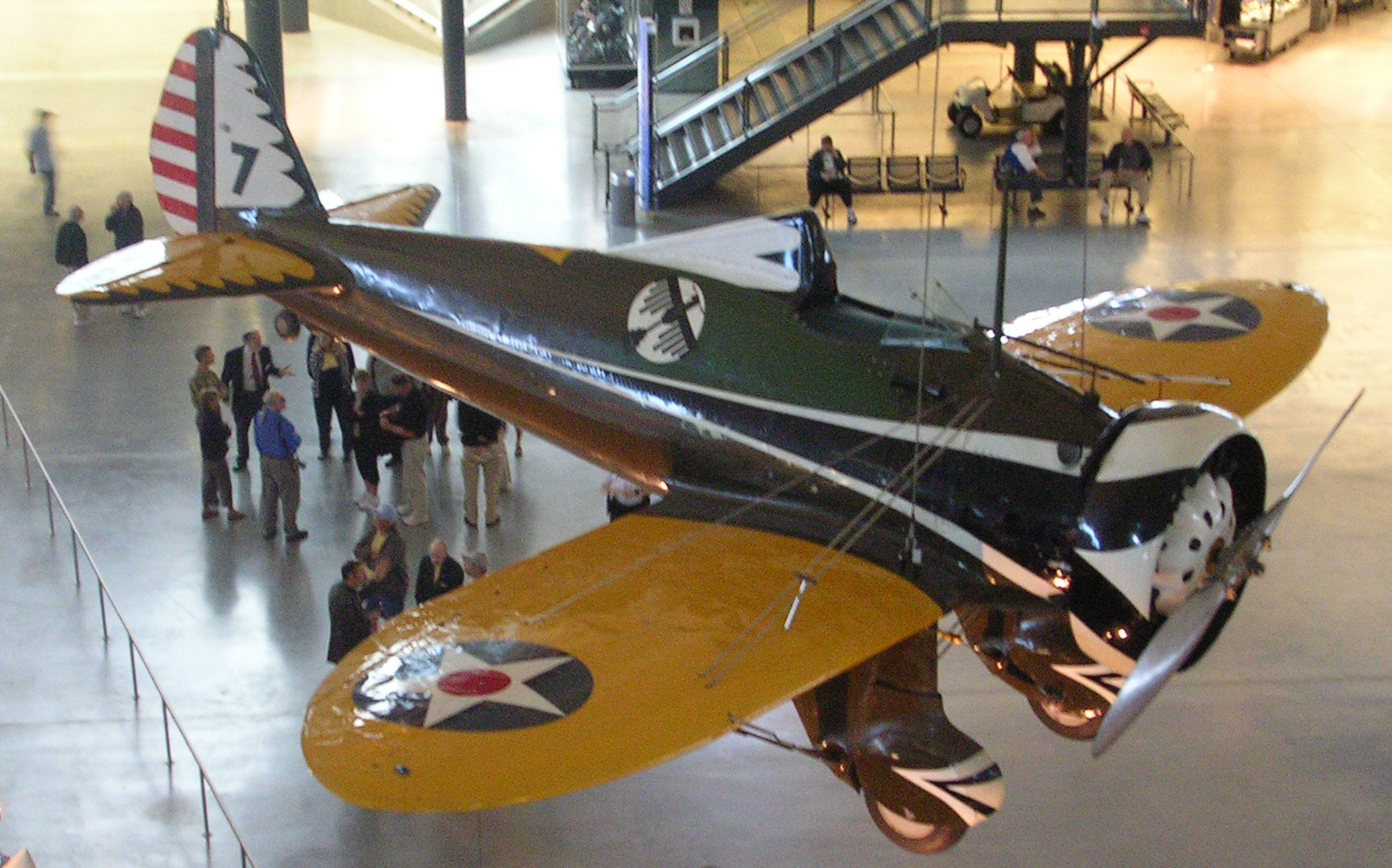
Boeing P-26A Peashooter of 34th Pursuit Squadron, 17th PG 1934–1935

1st Wing

(Brig. Gen. Henry H. Arnold, March Field, California)

7th Bombardment Group, Hamilton Field, California

9th, 11th, & 31st Bombardment Squadrons

17th Attack Group, March Field, California

34th, 73d, & 95th Attack Squadrons

19th Bombardment Group, March Field, California

23d, 30th, 32d, & 72nd Bombardment Squadrons (23d & 72d BS based in Hawaii)

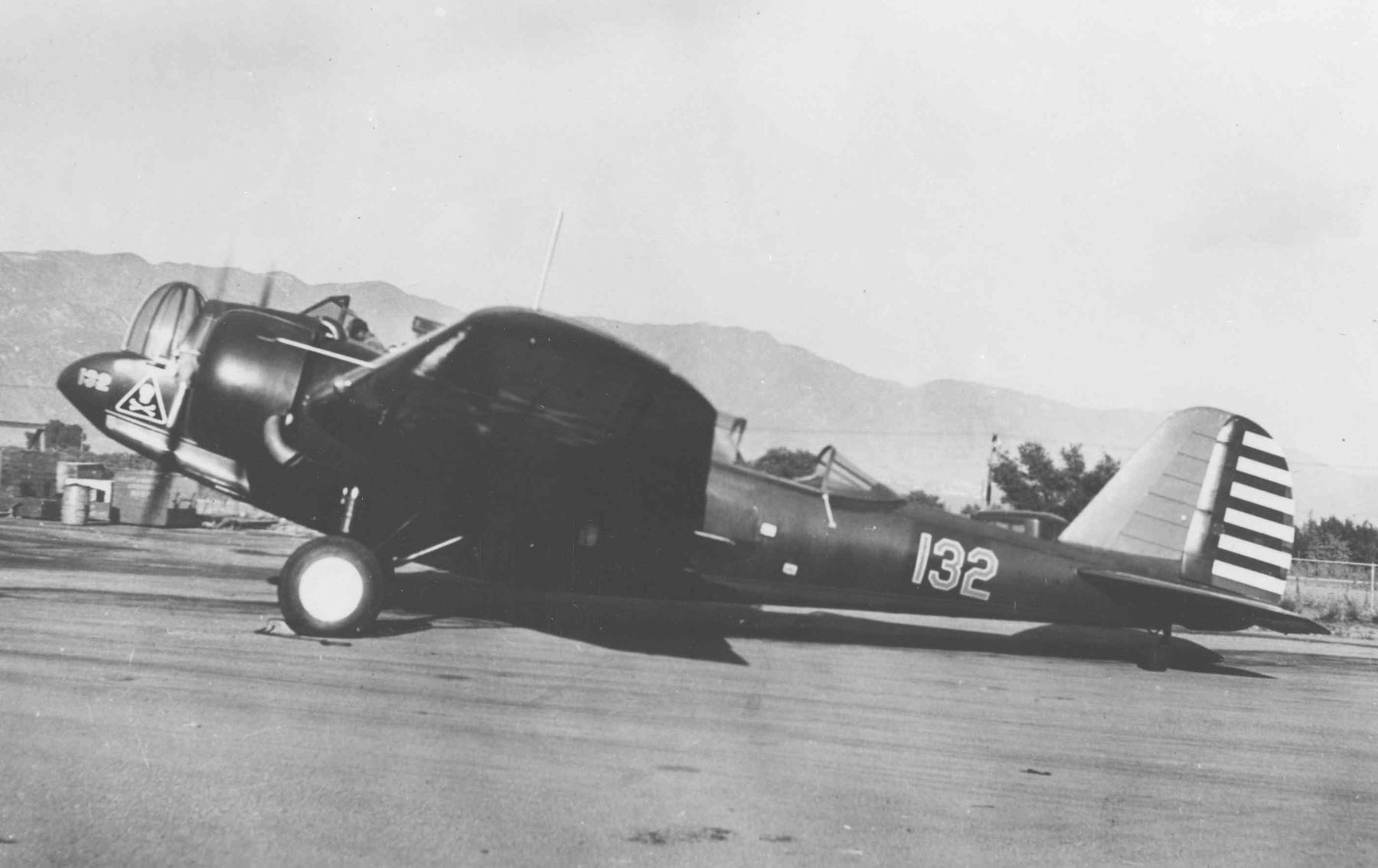
Martin B-12A (variant of the B-10) of 31st Bomb Squadron, 7th BG, Hamilton Field, California

2nd Wing

(Brig. Gen. H. Conger Pratt, Langley Field, Virginia)

37th Attack Squadron (attached to 8th Pursuit Group)

1st Pursuit Group, Selfridge Field, Michigan

17th, 27th, & 94th Pursuit Squadrons

2nd Bombardment Group, Langley Field, Virginia

20th, 49th, 54th, 2nd Bombardment Squadron Detrick Field, and 96th Bombardment Squadrons (54th detached to Air Corps Tactical School)

8th Pursuit Group, Langley Field, Virginia

33d, 35th, & 36th Pursuit Squadrons (37th Attack Squadron attached)

9th Bombardment Group, Mitchel Field, New York

1st, 5th, 14th, & 99th Bombardment Squadrons

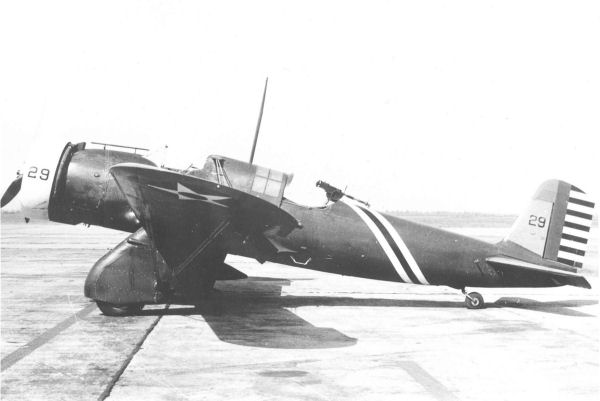
Curtiss A-12 Shrike of the 13th Attack Squadron, 3d AG, Barksdale Field, Louisiana

3rd Wing

(Col. Gerald C. Brant, Barksdale Field, Louisiana)

3d Attack Group, Barksdale Field, Louisiana

8th, 13th, & 90th Attack Squadrons (51st Attack Squadron detached to Air Corps Tactical School)

20th Pursuit Group, Barksdale Field, Louisiana

55th, 77th, & 79th Pursuit Squadrons (87th Pursuit Squadron detached to Air Corps Tactical School)

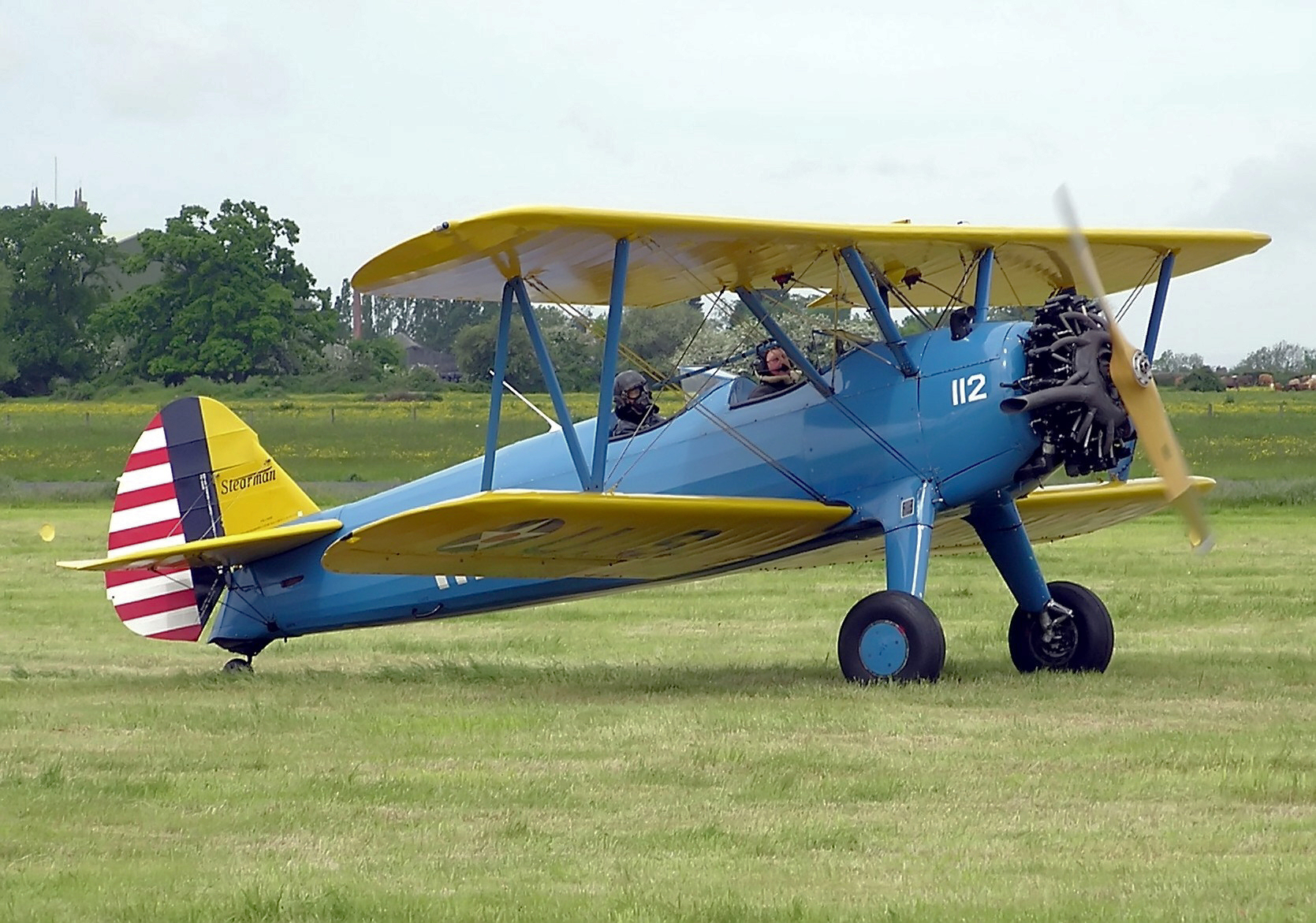
PT-13, Air Corps primary trainer

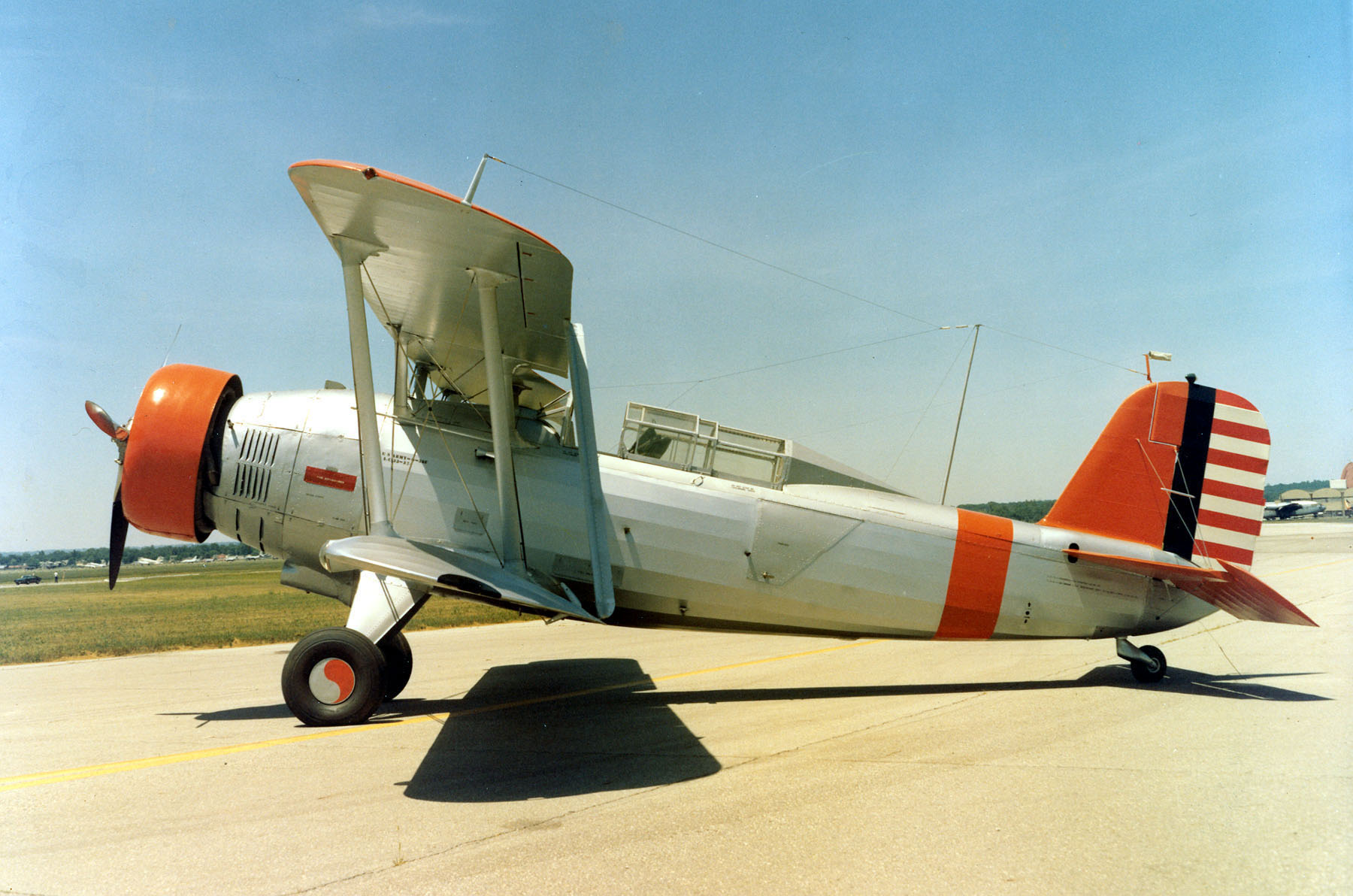
O-38F

==== Other flying units ====
Second Corps Area, United States Army, Mitchel Field, New York

97th Observation Squadron

Sixth Corps Area, United States Army, Scott Field, Illinois

15th Observation Squadron (Attached)

Eighth Corps Area, United States Army, Fort Sam Houston, Texas
12th Observation Group, Brooks Field, Texas

12th Observation Squadron
22d Observation Squadron
88th Observation Squadron

Ninth Corps Area, United States Army, Crissy Field, California

91st Observation Squadron

Air Corps Advanced Flying School, Kelly Field, Texas

40th Attack, 41st Observation, 42nd Bombardment, 43d Pursuit Squadrons (Note: These four squadrons were inactivated on 1 September 1936 and replaced by the 61st through 64th School Squadrons inclusive.)
39th School Squadron

Air Corps Primary Flying School, Randolph Field, Texas

46th, 47th, 52nd, and 53rd School Squadrons

Air Corps Tactical School, Maxwell Field, Alabama

51st Attack, 54th Bombardment, 86th Observation, 87th Pursuit Squadrons

Air Corps Technical School, Chanute Field, Illinois

48th Pursuit Squadron

Rockwell Air Depot, Rockwell Field, California

4th Transport Squadron (Activated 8 July 1935)

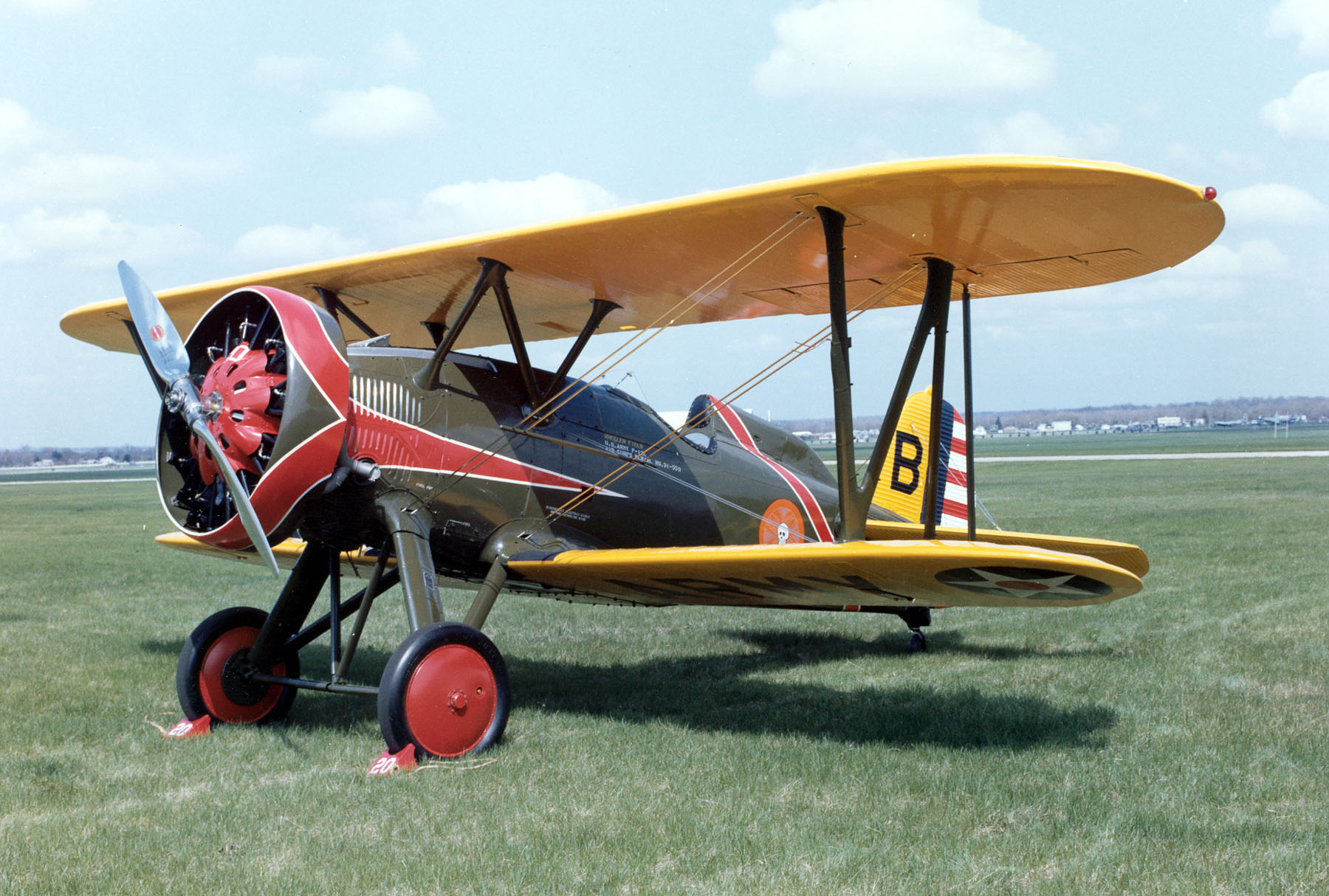
P-12E of 6th Pursuit Squadron, 18th PG 1935–1938, Wheeler Field, Hawaii

==== Overseas units ====
4th Composite Group, Clark Field, Luzon

2nd Observation, 3d Pursuit & 28th Bombardment Squadrons

18th Composite Wing

(Lt. Col. Delos Emmons, Fort Shafter, Hawaii) (Note: In September 1936 the wing became a general officer billet and Brig. Gen. Barton K. Yount was assigned.)

5th Composite Group, Luke Field, Hawaii

26th Attack, 4th & 50th Observation Squadrons (Note: The 23d and 72d BS from the 19th BG were attached.)

18th Pursuit Group, Wheeler Field, Hawaii

6th, 19th Pursuit Squadrons

19th Composite Wing

(Lt. Col. William C. McChord, Albrook Field, Panama Canal Zone) (Note: In June 1936 the wing became a general officer billet and Brig. Gen. George H. Brett was assigned.)

6th Composite Group, Albrook Field, Canal Zone

25th Bombardment, 7th & 44th Observation Squadrons

16th Pursuit Group, Albrook Field, Canal Zone

24th, 29th, 74th & 78th Pursuit Squadrons

=== Annual strength ===
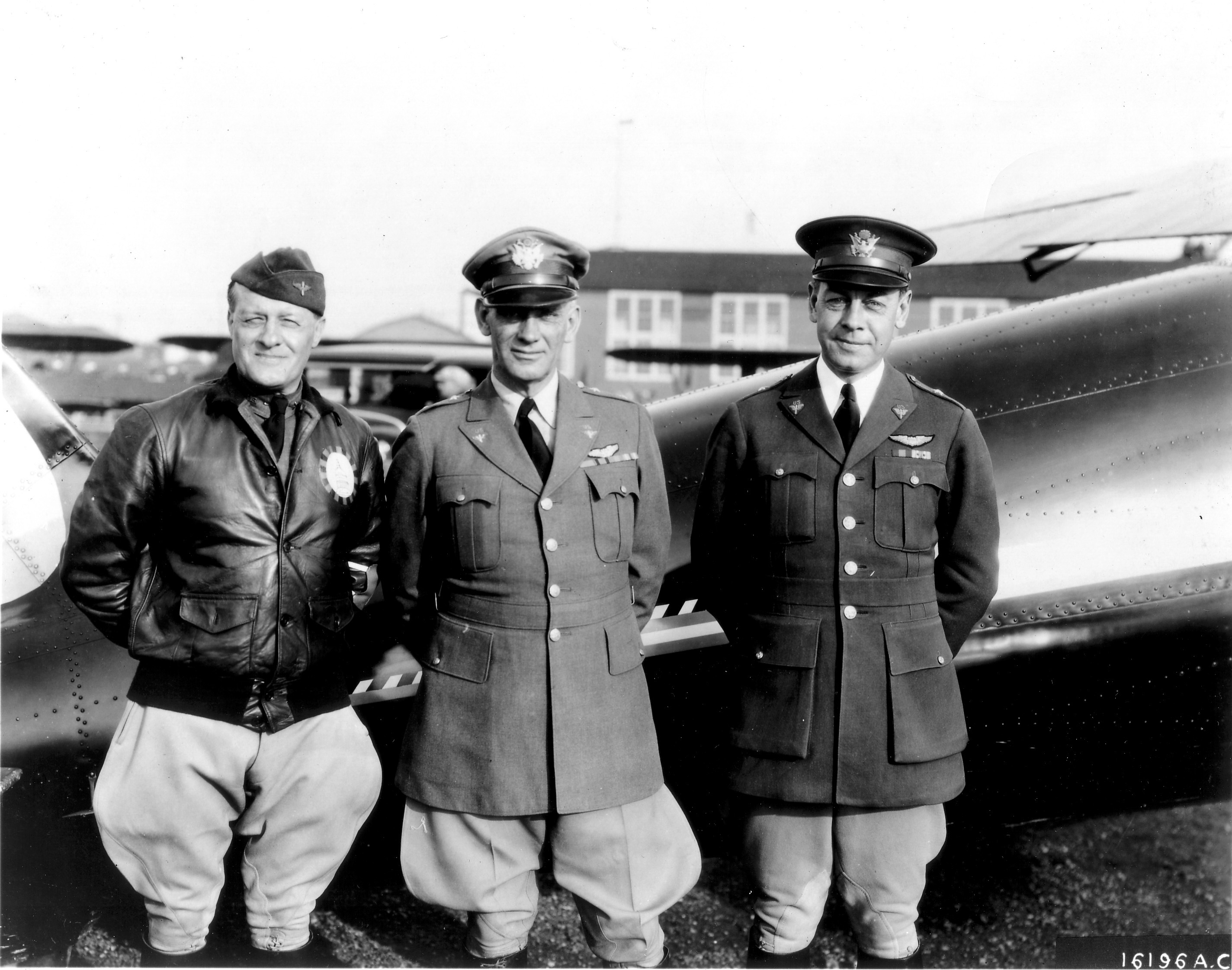
Generals Benjamin D. Foulois, Assistant Chief of Air Corps (left); James E. Fechet, Chief of Air Corps; and H. Conger Pratt, Chief of Materiel Division, in 1931.

Strength (i.e., number of personnel) as of 30 June of each year.

Year	Strength
1927	9,979
1928	10,518
1929	12,080
1930	13,305
1931	14,485
1932	14,650
1933	14,817
1934	15,621
1935	15,945
1936	16,863
1937	18,572
1938	20,196
1939	22,387
1940	51,185
1941	152,125

== Chiefs of Air Corps ==
No.	Portrait	Name (Birth–Death)	Term of office		
No.	Portrait	Name (Birth–Death)	Took office	Left office	Time in office
1		Major general Mason M. Patrick (1863–1942)	2 July 1926	13 December 1927	1 year, 164 days
2		Major general James E. Fechet (1877–1948)	14 December 1927	19 December 1931	4 years, 6 days
3		Major general Benjamin D. Foulois (1879–1967)	20 December 1931	21 December 1935	4 years, 1 day
4		Major general Oscar M. Westover (1883–1938)	22 December 1935	21 September 1938 †	2 years, 273 days
5		Major general Henry H. Arnold (1886–1950)	29 September 1938	20 June 1941	2 years, 264 days
6		Major general George H. Brett (1886–1963)	20 June 1941	9 March 1942	262 days

=== Commanding generals, GHQ Air Force ===
- Maj. Gen. Frank M. Andrews, 1 March 1935 – 1 March 1939
- Maj. Gen. Delos C. Emmons, 1 March 1939 – 20 June 1941

as Air Force Combat Command

- Lt. Gen. Delos C. Emmons, 20 June 1941 – 17 December 1941
- Maj. Gen. Carl A. Spaatz – c. January 1942 – 5 May 1942

== Lineage of the United States Air Force ==
- Aeronautical Division, Signal Corps 1 August 1907 – 18 July 1914
- Aviation Section, Signal Corps 18 July 1914 – 20 May 1918
- Division of Military Aeronautics 20 May 1918 – 24 May 1918
- Air Service, U.S. Army 24 May 1918 – 2 July 1926
- U.S. Army Air Corps 2 July 1926 – 20 June 1941*
- U.S. Army Air Forces 20 June 1941 – 18 September 1947*
- United States Air Force 18 September 1947 – present

* The Air Corps became a subordinate component of the Army Air Forces on 20 June 1941, and was abolished as an administrative organization on 9 March 1942. It continued to exist as one of the combat arms of the Army (along with Infantry, Cavalry, Artillery, Corps of Engineers, and Signal Corps) until abolished by reorganization provisions of the National Security Act of 1947 (61 Stat. 495), 26 July 1947.

== See also ==
- Bird of Paradise (aircraft)
- Question Mark (aircraft)
- Air Force Space Command

== Notes ==
Preceded by United States Army Air Service	United States Army Air Corps; 1926–1941	Succeeded by United States Army Air Forces
