= James Fechet =

United States Army Air Forces general

James Edmond Fechet
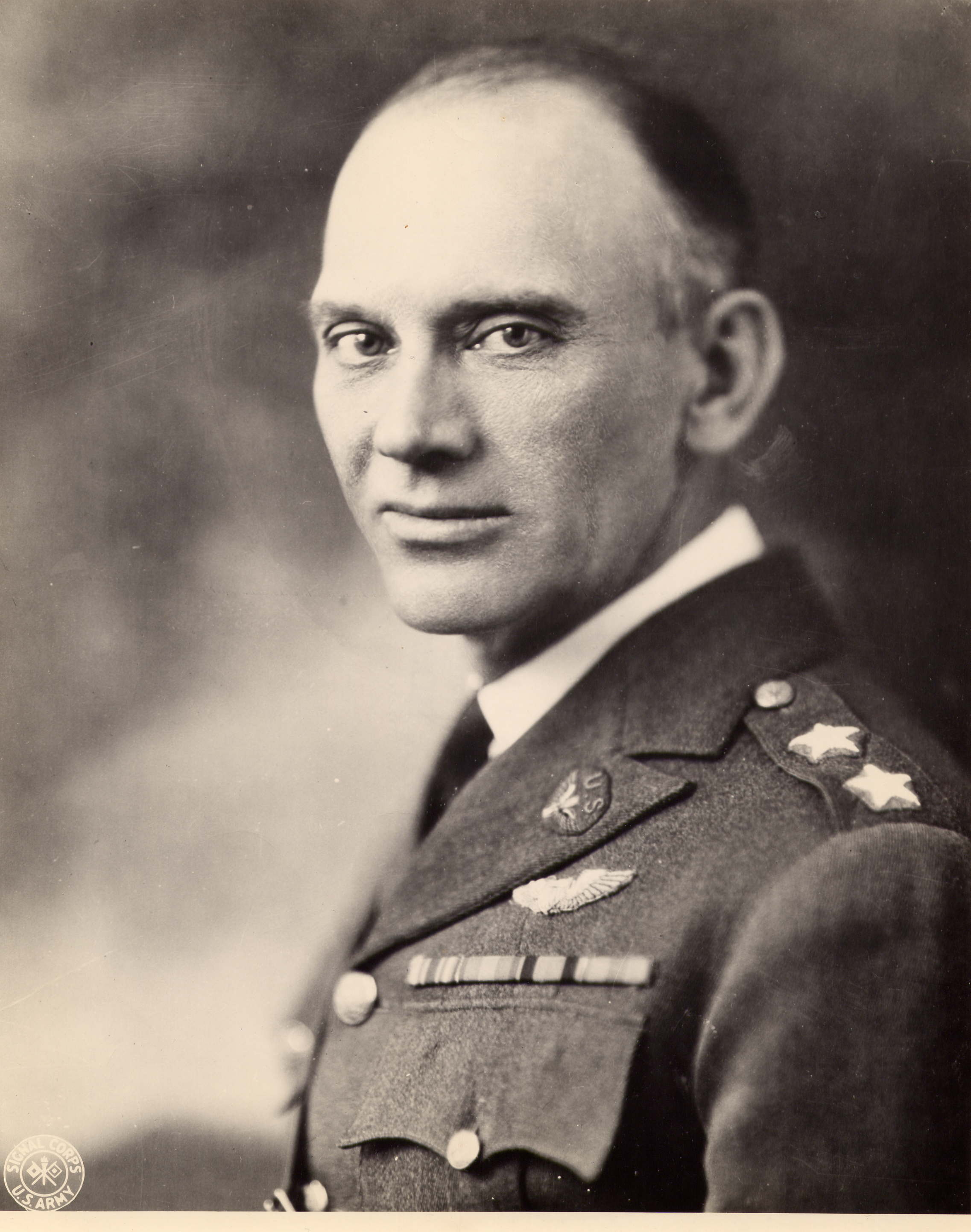
- Born: August 21, 1877; Fort Ringgold, Texas, US
- Died: February 10, 1948 (aged 70); Washington D.C., US
- Burial place: Arlington National Cemetery
- Military career
- Allegiance: United States of America
- Branch: United States Army
- Service years: 1898–1931; 1942–1946
- Rank: Major General
- Commands: US Army Air Corps
- Conflicts: Spanish–American War; Mexican Punitive Expedition; World War I World War II
- Awards: Distinguished Service Medal

James Edmond Fechet (August 21, 1877 – February 10, 1948) was a major general in the United States Army and the Chief of Air Corps 1927–1931. Men he had selected and worked with both on his staff and in other top Air Corps positions became key leaders of the United States Army Air Forces in World War II.

== Biography ==
Born at Fort Ringgold, Texas, in 1877, to Edmond G. Fechet, his military experience began with his youth as an Army Infantry officer's son living at various frontier stations in the West. He left the University of Nebraska in 1898 in his third year as a mechanical engineering student to serve as an enlisted man in the Spanish–American War. Wounded seriously at San Juan Hill in Cuba, Fechet recovered and applied for a commission. Serving as a sergeant in Troop D, 6th Cavalry, in the Philippines, Fechet was commissioned in December 1900 with date if rank from July 1, and for the next six years served in many cavalry assignments, including service in Hawaii, against the insurgents in the Philippines, and on the Punitive Expedition into Mexico. In 1912, as a captain in the 4th Cavalry, Fechet was assigned to duty at the military prison at Fort Leavenworth, Kansas.

On April 10, 1907, while stationed at Jefferson Barracks, Missouri, as a first lieutenant with the 9th Cavalry, Fechet married Catherine Luhn, daughter of retired Major Gerhard L. Luhn and sister of the depot adjutant, Captain William L. Luhn of the 10th Cavalry.

When the United States entered World War I, Fechet was promoted to temporary lieutenant colonel in the Signal Corps was assigned to the expanding Aviation Section on August 5, 1917 and served successively as commander of the Signal Corps Aviation School at Belleville, Illinois in 1917; commander of the Aviation School at Arcadia, Florida, in 1918; and Air Officer, Southern Department at Fort Sam Houston, Texas, 13 May 1919 – 1 Oct 1920. He received further wartime promotion to colonel in March 1918. Fechet was promoted to permanent major and lieutenant colonel, Cavalry, on 1 July 1920 when the Army Reorganization Act took effect, and formally transferred in grade to the Air Service, now a combatant arm of the line by act of Congress, on August 6, which made him 7th in seniority among officers in the branch.

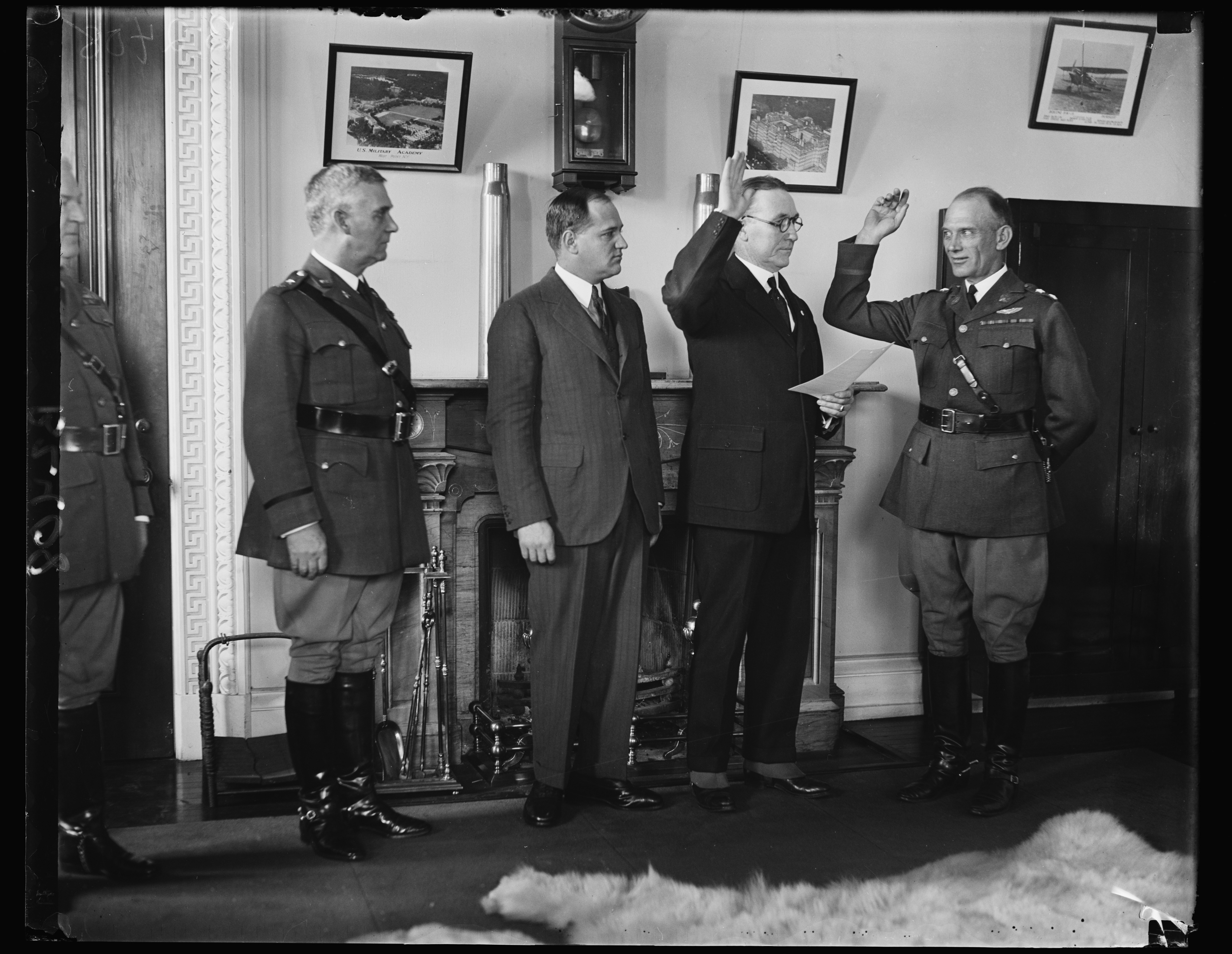
New Air Corps Chief takes oath of office. Maj. Gen. James F. Fechet being sworn in as Chief of the Army Air Corps to succeed Maj. Gen. Mason M. Patrick, retired. In the photograph, left to LCCN2016888567

Except for 10 months as the commandant of the Advanced Flying School at Kelly Field, Texas, Fechet spent the years from 1920 - 1931 in the Office of the Chief of Air Service/Chief of Air Corps. He was Assistant Chief of Air Service/Air Corps for more than 2½ years before becoming Chief of Air Corps in December 1927. He retired from the Army on December 10, 1931.

In March 1942, 44 years after he had served as a sergeant in the Spanish–American War, the retired Air Corps Chief was recalled to help standardize the criteria for promotions and decorations in the various Air Force commands worldwide. He was director of the Promotion Board at Army Air Forces Headquarters with additional duty as president of the Pilot Allocation Board, Procurement Board and Decorations Board. For his services in this role he was awarded the Army Distinguished Service Medal, the citation for which reads:

The President of the United States of America, authorized by Act of Congress July 9, 1918, takes pleasure in presenting the Army Distinguished Service Medal to Major General James Edmond Fechet (ASN: 0-1139), United States Army Air Forces, for exceptionally meritorious and distinguished services to the Government of the United States, in a duty of great responsibility as Director of the Promotion Board at Army Air Forces Headquarters with additional duty as president of the Pilot Allocation Board, Procurement Board and Decorations Board from March 1942 to April 1946. The singularly distinctive accomplishments of General Fechet and his dedicated contributions in the service of his country reflect the highest credit upon himself and the United States Army Air Forces.

Fechet retired for the second time nearly five years later, on December 31, 1946. He died in Walter Reed Hospital February 10, 1948, and was buried in Arlington National Cemetery.

== Legacy ==
Fechet was near or at the top of the air arm's leadership for more than a decade, during which the close-knit organization's strength grew from 9,000 to 15,000. In the Cavalry he had been an outstanding equestrian, and for a time was on the U.S. Cavalry team. He learned to fly and to parachute as soon as he joined the air arm although this was not required of officers entering in field grade. He said he learned to fly because he believed example to be essential to good leadership.

From General Fechet's long and eventful experience as a commander in both the Cavalry and the fledgling air arm grew an attitude about military leadership and management that was adopted by top Air Force leaders in World War II who had been his protégés in the 1930s. "Take care of the little people and they'll take care of you" was his dictum. He spent much time on the flight line, in the hangars and in the shops, and often inspected mess halls and warehouses. Morale of flyers and mechanics was to him as important a measurement factor for an operation as flying accident rates and engine failures. His concern for the welfare of personnel extended to career planning. He believed in sending to service schools those officers who showed promise—not those who could most easily be spared from duty. He had a faculty for remembering as individuals hundreds of enlisted men he had served with throughout his career and greeted them by name wherever he went in the Air Corps.

Being chief of the War Department's air arm was particularly difficult in the years between World War I and Hitler's rise in the mid-thirties. The government adhered to the Kellogg–Briand Pact renouncing war and endorsed the concept of limiting the strength of offensive forces. Moreover, the great military potential of airpower was not understood either by the general public or by many key officers in the ground forces.

Despite great handicaps, much of which stemmed from the air arm's subordinate position in the War Department, the Air Corps progressed remarkably while General Fechet was chief.

Under General Fechet the air arm grew from less than 1,000 aircraft to 1,700, organized into attack, bombardment, pursuit and observation squadrons. Big air maneuvers were organized in conjunction with the ground forces. The Air Corps was training group commanders, wing commanders and staffs for higher units.

The engineering and logistics center of the air arm, the Material Division, was established in its permanent home at Wright Field, Dayton, Ohio. It directed the work of other procurement and supply and maintenance operations in several states, linked by an air transport supply service.

The air arm was given the responsibility for land-based air defense of the coasts of the United States and the overseas possessions, an assignment increasing the Air Corps' requirements for long range air capabilities.

Fechet encouraged work on the first experimental monoplane bomber that led to the twin-engine Boeing B-9, forerunner, along with the Martin B-10, of World War II bombers.

The Fechet era of the U.S. Air Force heritage was a time of record-breaking speed, distance and endurance flights as the interest in aviation, both military and civilian, was intensified by Charles E. Lindbergh's inspiring flight.
