= Keystone LB-6 =

1927 bomber aircraft family by Keystone

LB-6/LB-7
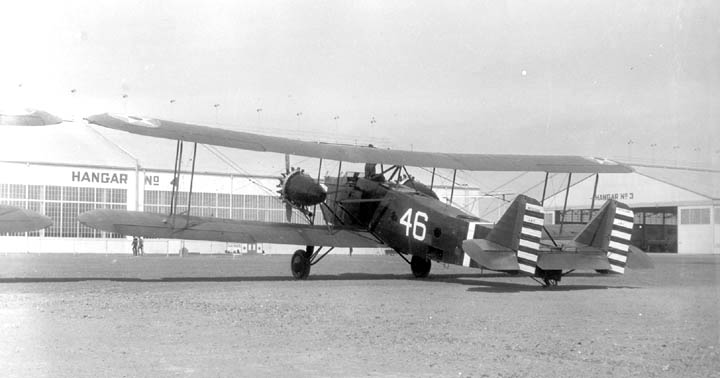
- Keystone LB-7

General information
- Type: Biplane light bomber
- Manufacturer: Keystone Aircraft
- Primary user: United States Army Air Corps
- Number built: 17 production LB-6; 18 production LB-7

History
- Introduction date: 1929
- First flight: 1927
- Retired: 1934

The Keystone LB-6 and LB-7 were 1920s American light bombers, built by the Keystone Aircraft company for the United States Army Air Corps, called Panther by the company, but adoption of the name was rejected by the U.S. Army.

== Design and development ==
The LB-6 was in competition with the Curtiss XB-2 for production in early 1928, and although the Curtiss aircraft was clearly the better of the two, the conservative Army Air Corps leadership chose the Wright-powered LB-6 and the Pratt & Whitney-powered LB-7, ordering 35 aircraft.

The LB-6/LB-7 was the first operational service model of a 13,000 lb (5,897 kg) twin-tail biplane bomber of a series produced by Keystone. 35 served operationally between 1929 and 1934. A number of variants were built for test and evaluation purposes but never placed into production or service. The LB-10 variant became the basis for the B-3 to B-6 series of similar bombers that were the last biplane bombers ordered by the Air Corps.

The Keystone XLB-6 prototype was created by refitting the final triple-tailed Keystone LB-5 (serial number 27-344) with an LB-5A tail unit; longer (75 foot) straight-chord, untapered, and noticeably swept-back wings; and 525 hp (391 kW) Wright Cyclone R-1750-1 radial engines suspended on struts between the wings rather than mounted on the lower wing. This produced a bomber with twice the rate of climb as the LB-5 and a slightly faster cruise speed. Production LB-6s featured a five-foot longer fuselage.

The LB-7 used the same extended-span LB-6 airframe powered by Pratt & Whitney Hornet engines.

The remaining variants were ordered before the 1930 change of designators by the United States Army Air Corps from "LB-" (Light bomber) to "B-", but were delivered after the change. Although delivered as bombers, they saw service as cargo and observation aircraft. The LB-10 variant became the basis of the B-3 through B-6 bombers, all of which used the original LB-6 design, and which served as the primary bombardment force of the Army Air Corps prior to the advent of the monoplane bomber.

== Operational history ==
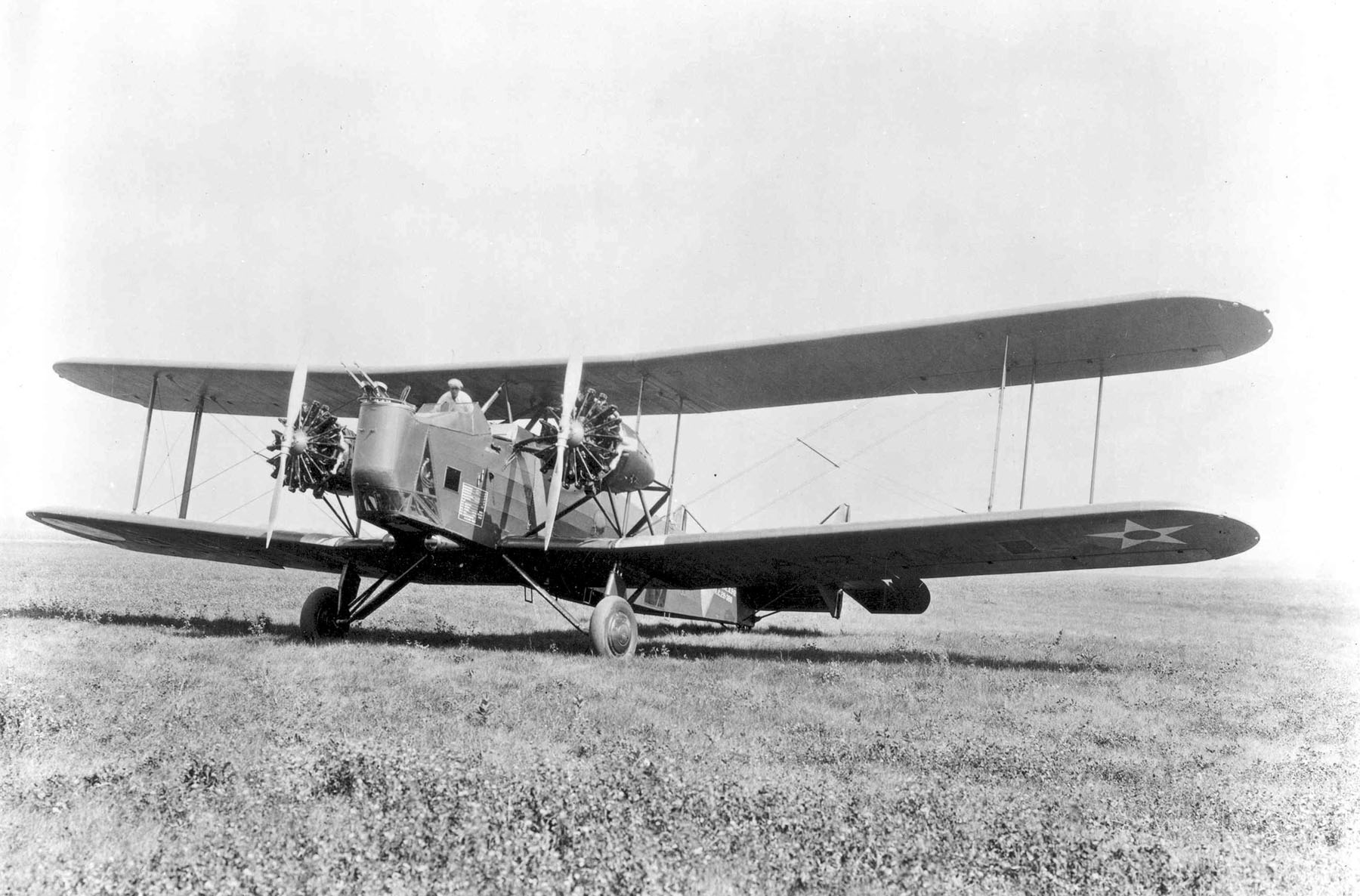
XLB-12 prototype

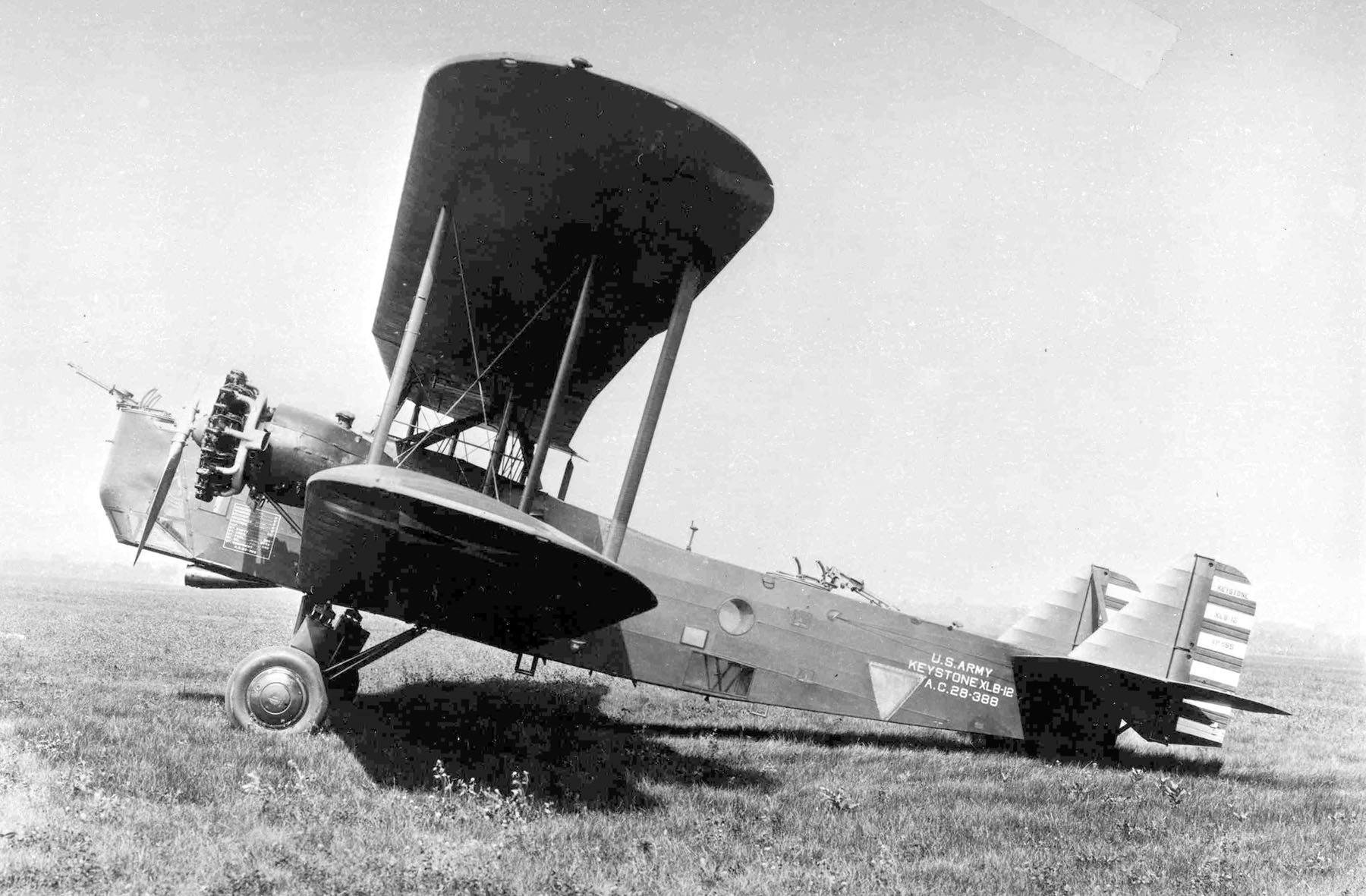
XLB-12 port-side view

According to an article in the Baltimore Sun the XLB-12 Prototype was used on a refueling and bombing trial in April 1929. Big Bomber to be Refueled during Flight "The huge twin-motored army bomber (sic) which will take off from Dayton, O., fly to New York City and be refueled while in midair, after which she will drop bomb flares on the city and make a return flight to the Dayton army field. The flight is to be a practicable demonstration by the Army Air Corps of the value of refueling airplanes in the air when engaged in bombing expeditions over a long distance". The aircraft was wrecked in August the same year.

Eight LB-6s and all operational LB-7s were delivered to the 20th and 96th Bomb Squadrons of the 2nd Bomb Group at Langley Field, Virginia, and the 11th Bomb Squadron of the 7th Bomb Group at Rockwell Field, California, between January and September 1929. The nine remaining LB-6s were sent to the 23rd and 72nd Bomb Squadrons, attached to 5th Composite Group at Luke Field, Hawaii, between July and September 1929. In May 1930 three LB-6s were re-engined to become LB-7s and transferred to the 25th Bomb Squadron of the 6th Composite Group based at France Field in the Panama Canal Zone, where they were all written off in 1931.

Beginning in March 1931, the surviving bombers in the Continental United States were taken out of front-line service, re-designated the ZLB-6 and ZLB-7, and sent to the 40th School Squadron at Kelly Field, Texas, where all were scrapped or surveyed by April 1935. The Hawaiian LB-6s served until 1934, when they too were surveyed in-situ.

=== Surviving airframes ===
The frame of a USAAC LB-7 aircraft, which crashed in Nicaragua in 1931, was still intact when inspected in 1969.

== Variants ==
XLB-6
One LB-5 modified for evaluation.
LB-6
Production version with Wright R-1750-1 Cyclone radial engines of 525 hp (391 kW), 17 built in 1929.
LB-7
LB-6 with 525 hp (391 kW) Pratt & Whitney R-1690 Hornet A engines, 18 built in 1929 and three LB-6s re-engined as LB-7s in 1930.
LB-8
One LB-7 re-engined with 550 hp (410 kW) Pratt & Whitney R-1860 Hornet B engines for evaluation.
LB-9
One LB-7 re-engined with 575 hp (429 kW) Wright GR-1750B geared engines for evaluation.
XLB-10
One LB-6 re-engined with 525 hp (391 kW) R-1690-3 Hornet A engines.
LB-10
Production version of the XLB-10, 63 built, all redesignated B-3A prior to delivery. 36 built as B-3A with Pratt & Whitney engines; the remaining 27 became B-5s with Wright engines.
LB-11
One LB-6 re-engined with 525 hp (391 kW) R-1750-3s for evaluation.
LB-11A
LB-11 re-engined with 525 hp (391 kW) GR-1750s for evaluation.
(X)LB-12
Similar to the LB-7, with 575 hp (429 kW) R-1860-1 Hornet B engines for evaluation.
LB-13
Proposed version with 525 hp (391 kW) GR-1690 Hornet A engines; seven ordered, but re-engined and re-designated before production. Five delivered as the Y1B-4, two as the Y1B-6.
LB-14
Proposed version with 575 hp (429 kW) GR-1860 Hornet B engines; three ordered, but re-engined and re-designated before production. Delivered as the Y1B-5.
ZLB-6
1931 designation of two LB-6 and the LB-11 (in 1933) as training aircraft.
ZLB-7
1931 designation of ten LB-7 as training aircraft.

== Operators ==
United States

- United States Army Air Corps

== Specifications (LB-6) ==
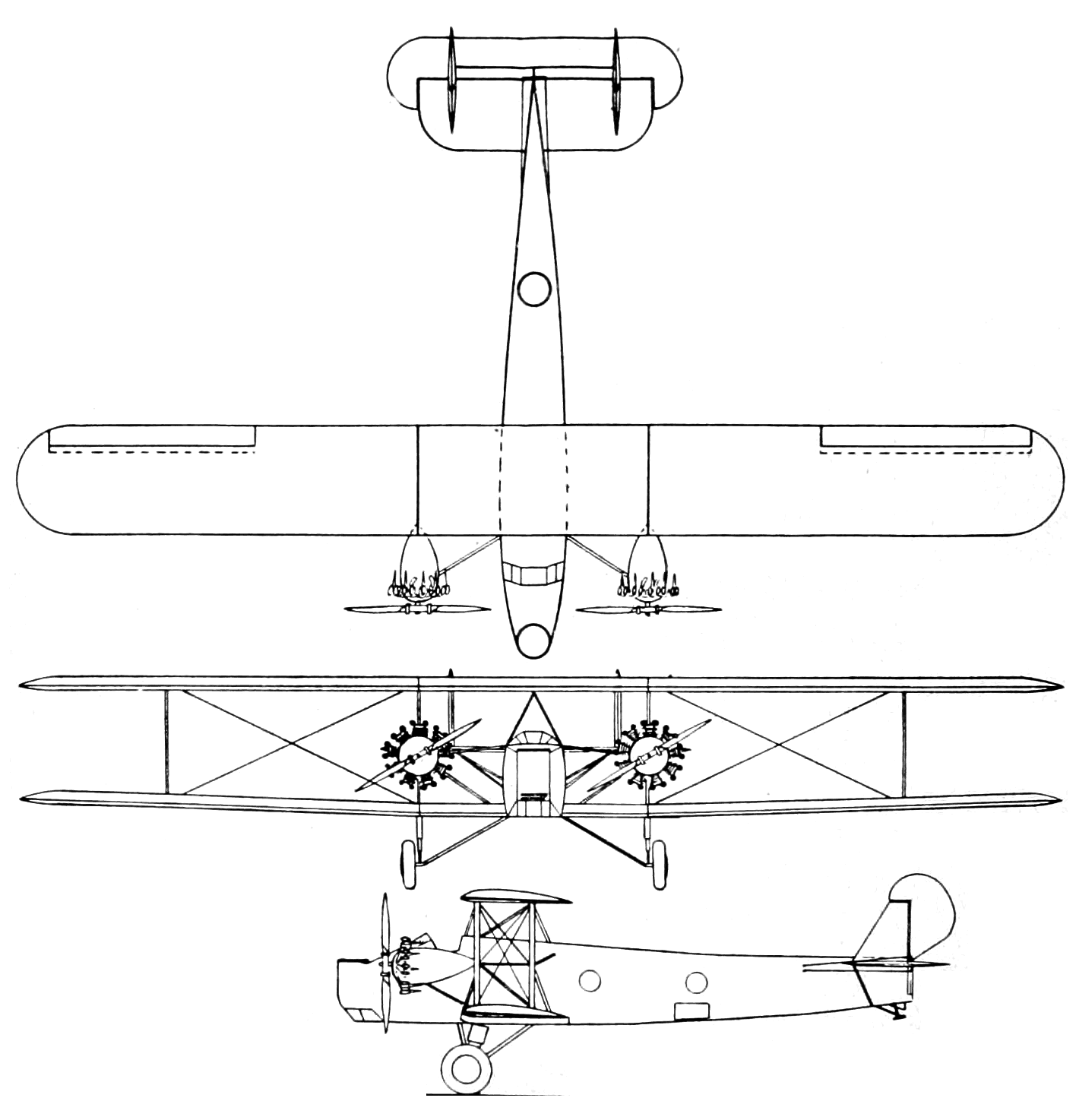
Keystone Panther 3-view drawing from Aero Digest July 1928

Data from Keystone LB-6, National Museum of the USAF fact page

General characteristics

- Crew: Five
- Length: 49 ft 3 in (15.01 m)
- Wingspan: 75 ft 0 in (23.0 m)
- Height: 18 ft 1 in (5.5 m)
- Wing area: 1,148 sq ft (106.38 m^{2})
- Empty weight: 7,024 lb (3,186 kg)
- Gross weight: 13,440 lb (6,100 kg)
- Powerplant: 2 × Wright Cyclone R-1750-1 radial engines , 525 hp (391 kW) each

Performance

- Maximum speed: 114 mph (183 km/h, 99 kn)
- Cruise speed: 95 mph (153 km/h, 83 kn)
- Range: 632 mi (1,017 km, 549 nmi)
- Service ceiling: 11,650 ft (3,550 m)
- Rate of climb: 600 ft/min (180 m/s)

Armament

- 2 × trainable .303 in (7.7 mm) Lewis guns in open position in nose
- 2 × trainable .303 in (7.7 mm) Lewis guns in open dorsal position
- 1 × trainable .303 in (7.7 mm) Lewis gun in ventral hatch
- 2,000 lb (910 kg) Bombs

== See also ==
Related development

- Keystone B-3
- Keystone B-4
- Keystone B-5
- Keystone B-6

Related lists

- List of military aircraft of the United States
