= 96th Bomb Squadron =

US Air Force unit

96th Bomb Squadron

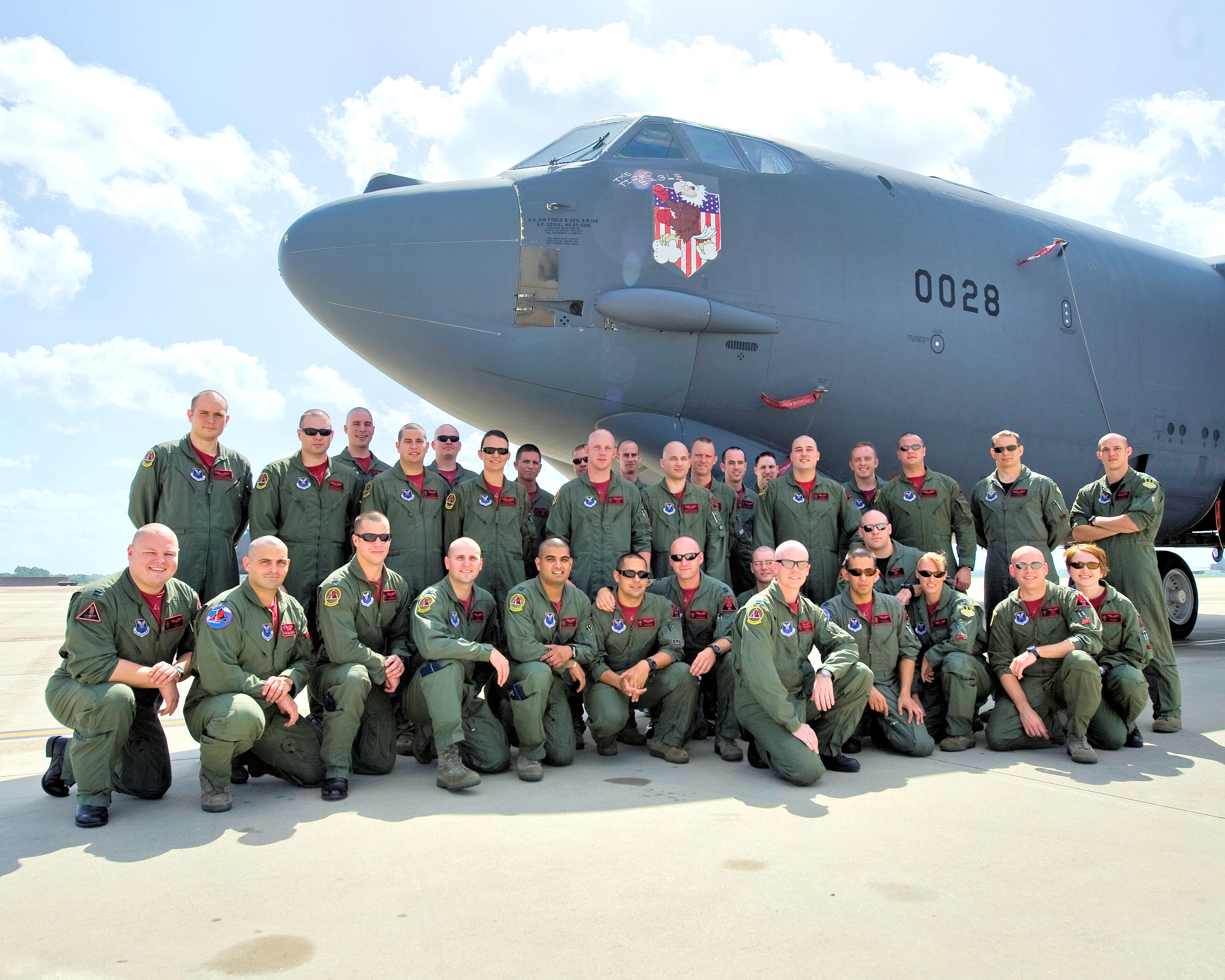
- 96th Bomb Squadron members with B-52H Stratofortress (Note: Aircraft is Boeing B-52H-145-BW Stratofortress serial 60-28.)
- Active: 1917–1946; 1947–1963; 1993–present
- Country: United States
- Branch: United States Air Force
- Type: Squadron
- Role: Bombardment
- Part of: Global Strike Command
- Garrison/HQ: Barksdale Air Force Base, Louisiana
- Nickname: Red Devils
- Colors: Red and Black
- Mascot: Red Devil
- Tail Code: "LA"
- Engagements: World War I; World War II - Antisubmarine; World War II - EAME Theater; Operation Desert Strike Operation Southern Watch Operation Allied Force; Afghanistan Campaign

- Decorations: Distinguished Unit Citation (2x); Air Force Outstanding Unit Award (6x)

Insignia
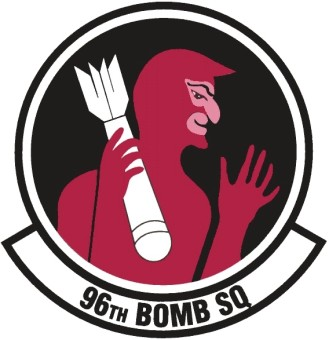
- 96th Bomb Squadron emblem (Air Force Historical Research Agency version)

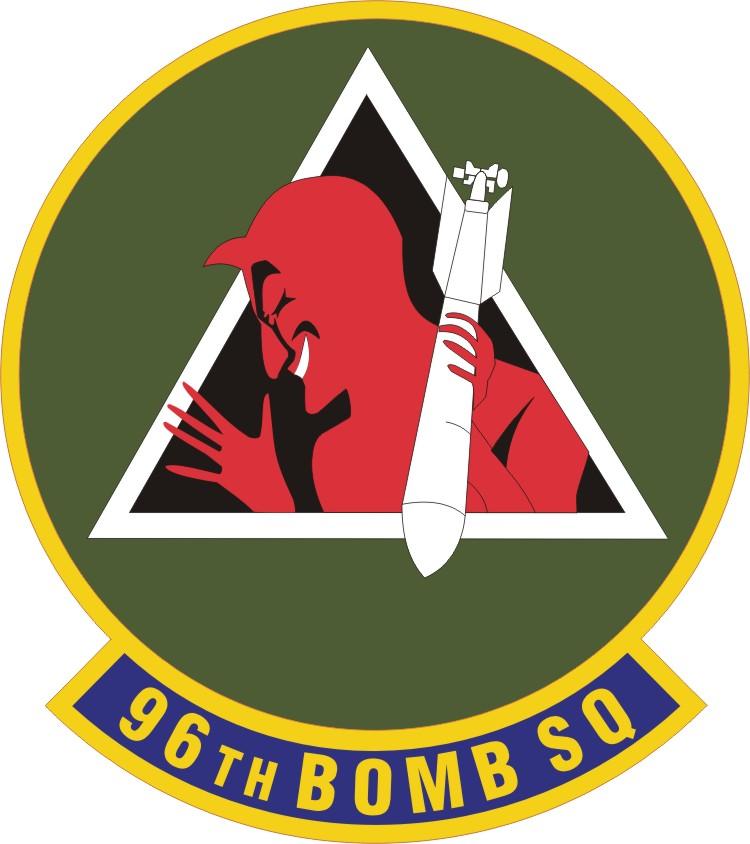
- 96th Bomb Sq emblem (The Institute of Heraldry version) (Note: "On a disc vert, a caricatured devil proper facing dexter, grasping in his dexter hand a bomb argent inside a triangle of the second and filled sable, all within a narrow border yellow. Attached below the disc, a blue scroll edged with a narrow yellow border and inscribed "96TH BOMB SQ" in Yellow letters. The emblem is symbolic of the "Daredevil" qualities of fearlessness and boldness, the devil characterizes the spirit of the Squadron and its past and present personnel. The bomb represents the historic mission of the unit, which it has performed since the beginning of aerial warfare in World War I.""Uniformed Services, U.S. Air Force Heraldry, 96th Bomb Squadron". The Institute of Heraldry. Archived from the original on 2 September 2017.)

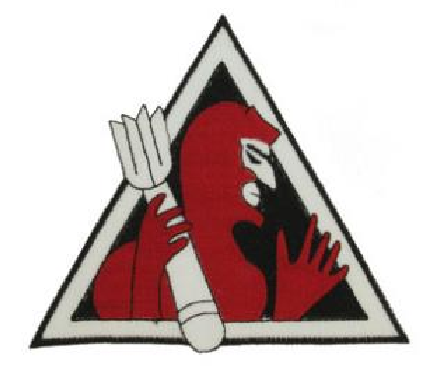
- 96th Bombardment Squadron emblem (approved 4 March 1924)

The 96th Bomb Squadron is a unit of the United States Air Force 2d Operations Group located at Barksdale Air Force Base, Louisiana. The 96th is equipped with the Boeing B-52H Stratofortress.

Formed in August 1917, the 96 BS saw combat on the World War I Western Front, in France. It took part in the St. Mihiel offensive and Meuse-Argonne offensive. Later, it served with the Army Air Service and Army Air Corps in the Inter-War period it participated in Brig. Gen. Billy Mitchell's 1921 off-shore bombing tests and during World War II fought in the North African and Italian campaigns. It was a part of Strategic Air Command during the Cold War. Since 1993, the 96th Bomb Squadron has flown the B-52H Stratofortress long-range heavy bomber, which can perform a variety of missions. Today the squadron is engaged in the global war on terrorism.

== History ==
=== World War I ===
On 12 June 1918 the 96th Aero Squadron were the first Americans to bomb in combat at Dommary-Baroncourt Railyard, France. It was formed at Kelly Field, Texas. Originally consisting of 80 men, largely college graduates or college dropouts, volunteers all, and something of an elite group, since their aeronautical qualifications were the highest in the U.S. Army Air Service. Just before embarking upon its first aerial warfare, the squadron decided upon its insignia, a black triangle outlined by a white strip enclosing the profile of a red devil thumbing his nose at the ground with his left hand. In his right, he held a white bomb. This distinctive emblem was designed by the squadron's talented graphic artist, Harry O. Lawson.

The 96th saw combat as part of the 1st Day Bombardment Group, supporting the French Eighth and U.S. First Army from, 12 June 1918 – 4 November 1918. It operated French-made Breguet 14 planes and was involved in an embarrassing fiasco when the entire squadron landed around Koblenz, Germany by accident, providing all of their planes intact to the Germans. Nonetheless, it was the most heavily engaged and most successful USAS bomber squadron.

=== Inter-War period ===
Returned to the United States from France in May, 1919, was re-organized at Ellington Field, Houston, Texas and equipped with Martin MB-2 day bombers. Reassigned to several airfields in the southwest, its primary mission was reconnaissance along the Mexican border.

In May 1920 was temporarily assigned to Langley Field, Virginia and became part of the First Provisional Air Brigade under General Billy Mitchell. Trained with the Handley Page O/400 and Martin MB-2 bombers. Its mission would be to attack captured German ships along the Atlantic coast off Virginia in a service demonstration to determine whether a battleship could be sunk by bombing. The targets were an aged and surplus US battleship and four former German Navy vessels, including the battleship SMS Ostfriesland, obtained in the peace settlement after World War I and scheduled for scuttling.

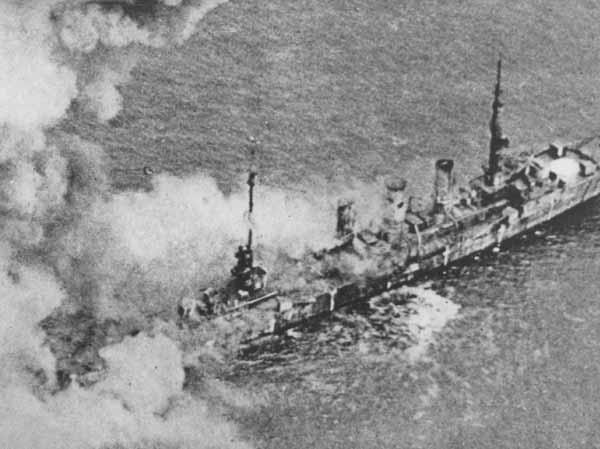
SMS Frankfurt burning after being bombed

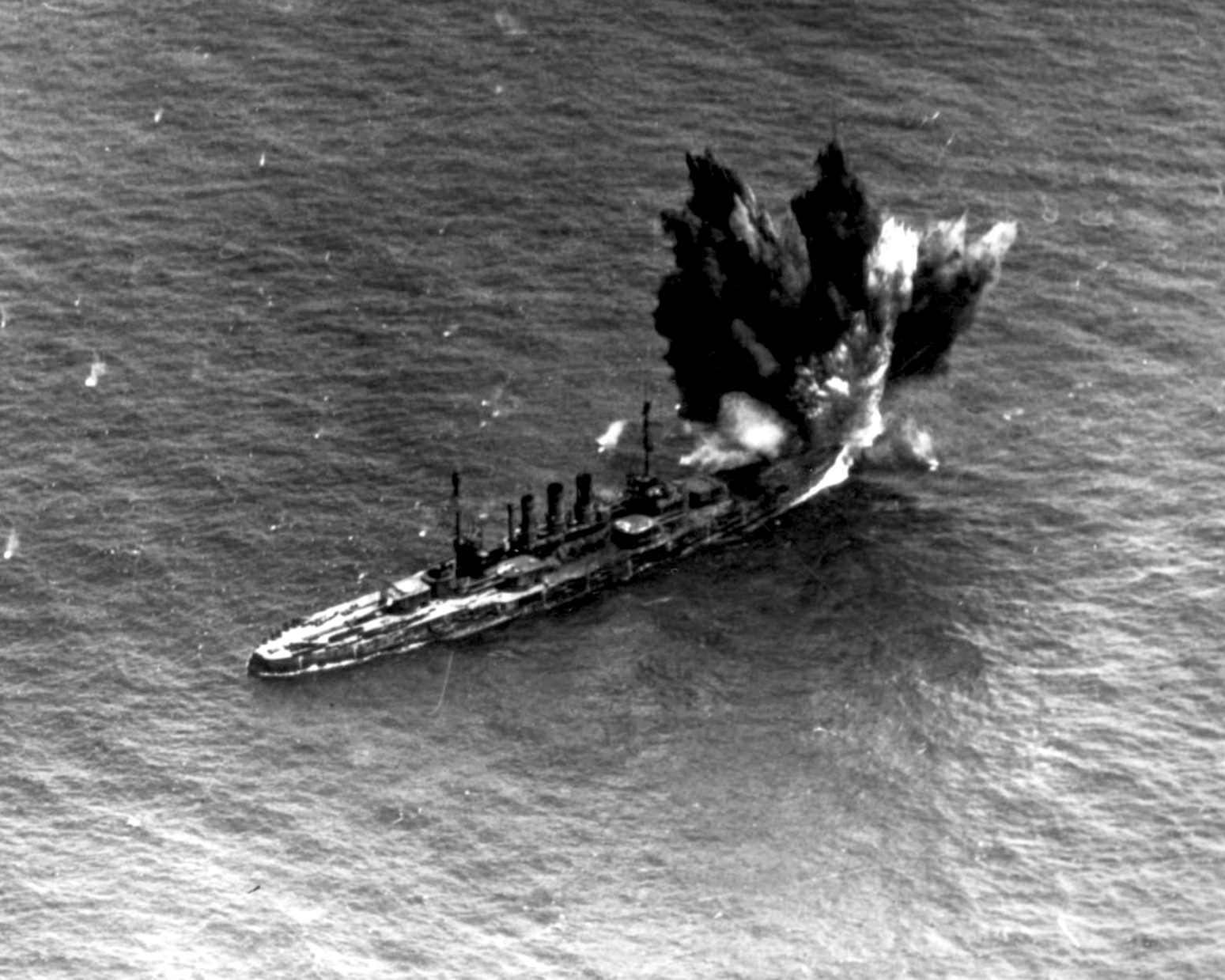
SMS Ostfriesland with a bomb exploding near her bow 1921.

On 13 July the Army airmen made their first appearance. The Martin bombers (limited to 300-pound bombs by the rules of the service test by the Navy) sank the former German destroyer G-102 in 19 minutes. On 18 July Navy and Army airplanes took turns attacking the former German light cruiser SMS Frankfurt. No bomb heavier than 600 pounds was allowed. There were frequent intermissions as inspectors dragged out their on-board inspections. The Air Service was finally allowed to strike and sank the vessel with 600-pound bombs. The Navy, which had figured on using gunfire from ships to finish off Frankfurt, was surprised.

On 21 July a flight of six Martins and two Handley Pages, each carrying a 2,000-pound bomb. As the pilots stood by waiting to take off, Johnson called with a change in rules. The bombers could bring no more than three of their biggest bombs to the target area. The written agreement had been that the Air Service would be allowed two direct hits with their biggest bombs. One of the Handley Pages had to drop out of the formation, but the other seven airplanes went on to the target. They had no intention of making two direct hits and stopping the test. Their orders were to aim for near misses to create water hammer shock waves against the hull. The first bomb fell at 12:18 p.m. It was a near miss, as planned. The other airplanes swept in at spaced intervals and delivered their ordnance. "We could see her rise eight or 10 feet between the terrific blows from under water," Mitchell said. The sixth bomb, at 12:31, sealed Ostfriesland's doom. Twenty-two minutes after the first bomb fell, the old battleship sank at 12:40. The seventh airplane, a Handley Page, dropped its unneeded bomb as a final salute at the point where the battleship had gone down.

With the completion of the demonstration, the 96th returned to Texas in October. The unit transferred to Langley Field on a permanent basis in June 1922 and engaged in routine training; tested and experimented with equipment and tactics; participated in maneuvers; flew mercy missions to aid victims of a flood in Pennsylvania in 1936 and victims of an earthquake in Chile in 1939; and made goodwill flights to South America in the late 1930s.

Received new Boeing B-17B Flying Fortress in the summer of 1939, being one of the first three squadrons to receive the new bomber. In November 1939, seven Fortresses flew from Langley Field to Rio de Janeiro, Brazil on a good-will mission. All planes returned safely with no major incidents, once again demonstrating the safety and reliability of the B-17 design.

=== World War II ===
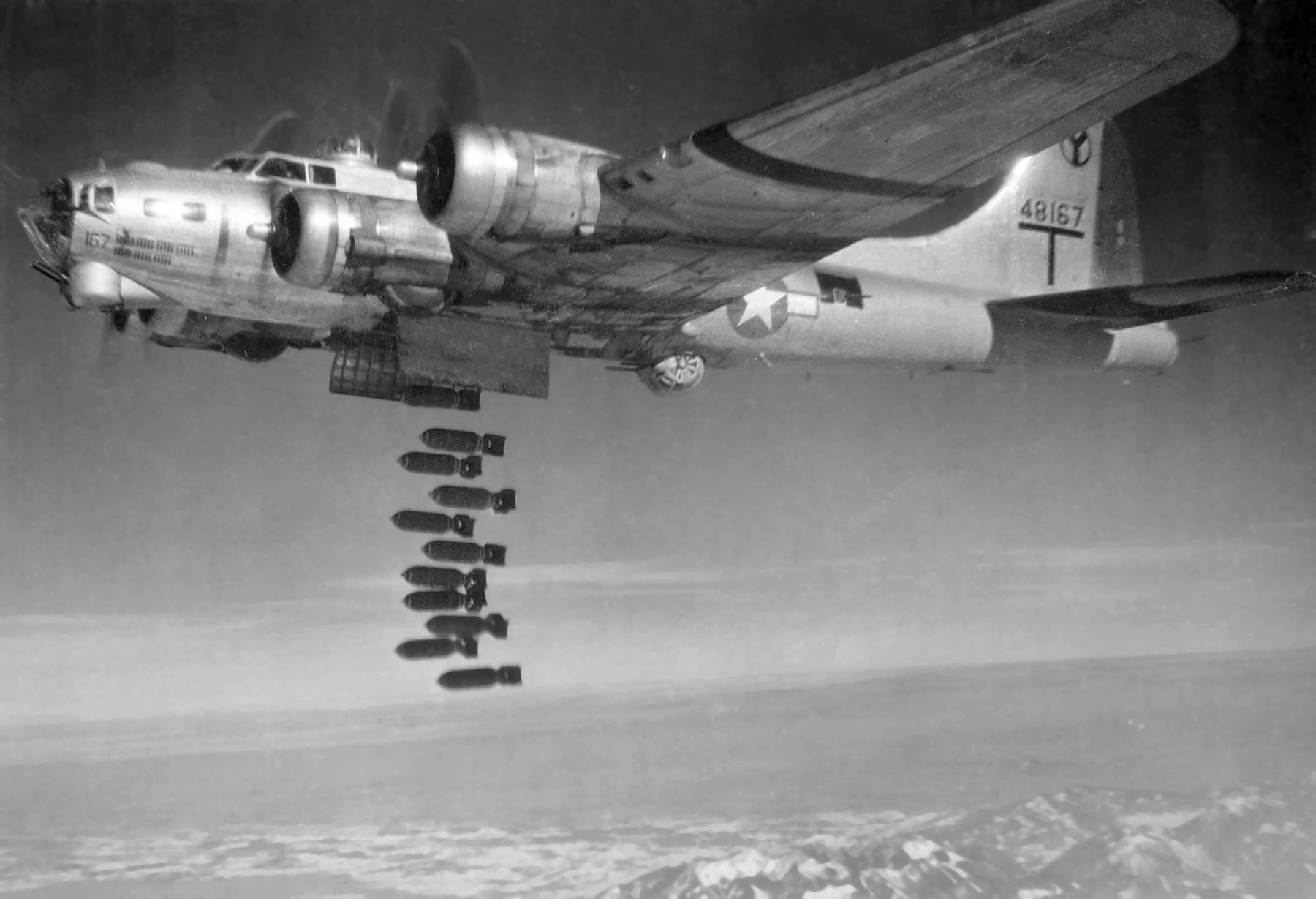
Lockheed-Vega B-17G-50-VE Fortress-44-8167-96th Bomb Squadron.

After the Attack on Pearl Harbor, served on antisubmarine duty along the mid-Atlantic coastline as part of I Bomber Command for several months until AAF Antisubmarine Command was formed and took over that duty.

Re-equipped with more modern B-17F Flying Fortresses and assigned to II Bomber Command in Pacific Northwest for transition and combat training in late 1942 and early 1943. Moved to North Africa in April 1943, carrying out bombing missions in Algeria and Tunisia as part of Twelfth Air Force during the North African campaign. Flew many support and interdictory missions, bombing such targets as marshalling yards, airdromes, troop concentrations, bridges, docks, and shipping. Participated in the defeat of Axis forces in Tunisia, Apr-May 1943; the reduction of Pantelleria and the preparations for the Allied Invasion of Sicily, May-Jul 1943; the invasion of Italy, Sep 1943.

Transferred to Fifteenth Air Force in December 1943 and engaged in bombing operations primarily in Italy in support of the Allied drive north toward Rome, Jan-Jun 1944; the Invasion of southern France, Aug 1944; and the campaigns against German forces in northern Italy, Jun 1944-May 1945. Engaged primarily in long-range bombardment of strategic targets after Oct 1943, attacking oil refineries, aircraft factories, steel plants, and other objectives in Germany, Poland, Czechoslovakia, Austria, Hungary, Yugoslavia, Romania, and Greece.

En route to bomb a vital aircraft factory at Steyr on 24 Feb 1944, the group was greatly outnumbered by enemy interceptors, but it maintained its formation and bombed the target, receiving a Distinguished Service Cross for the performance. On the following day, while on a mission to attack aircraft factories at Regensburg, it met similar opposition equally well and was awarded a second DUC. Served as part of the occupation force in Italy after V-E Day. Inactivated in Italy on 28 Feb 1946.

=== Cold War ===
Reactivated under Strategic Air Command on 1 July 1947 and equipped with Boeing B-29 Superfortresses. Trained for strategic bombardment missions during the postwar years, being upgraded to the new atomic bomb-capable Boeing B-50 Superfortress in 1948. Replaced the propeller-driven B-50s with new Boeing B-47E Stratojet swept-wing medium bombers in 1954, capable of flying at high subsonic speeds and primarily designed for penetrating the airspace of the Soviet Union. In the late 1950s, the B-47 was considered to be reaching obsolescence, and was being phased out of SAC's strategic arsenal. Began sending aircraft to other B-47 wings as replacements or to storage at Davis-Monthan Air Force Base, Arizona in late 1962 and was inactivated in April 1963.

=== Reactivation ===
The squadron was reactivated on 1 October 1993 as part of the 2nd Operations Group, 2nd Bomb Wing at Barksdale AFB, Louisiana using the personnel, facilities and aircraft from the recently inactivated 596th Bomb Squadron.

On 1 August 1994 B-52H's 60-0008 "Lucky Lady IV" and 60-0059 "Laissez Le Bon Temps Roulez" set off on a round the world bombing mission, named Exercise Global Power 94-7. The bombers (using the callsigns Storm 1 & Storm 2) flew east and after around 17 hours into the flight they each dropped 27 Mk82 500lb bombs on the Udairi Bomb Range in Kuwait from a height of 800 feet. The two bombers continued flying east and landed back at Barksdale AFB 47.2 hours later, setting a new world record.

In September 1996, it deployed and launched attacks against military targets in Iraq in support of Operation Desert Strike. It earned the 1996 Mackay Trophy for the 33-hour long mission from Louisiana to Iraq and back as the most meritorious flight of the year. Since 1993 it has conducted combat operations to support worldwide conventional and nuclear taskings and provided long-range, heavy strike, initial response, and sustained firepower in support of all regional and global warfighting commanders. In late 1996, the squadron deployed to support Operation Southern Watch, returning again in 1998. In 1999, crews from the squadron deployed to Royal Air Force Base Fairford in support of Operation Allied Force.

In January 2002, the squadron deployed to fly combat missions in support of Operation Enduring Freedom over Afghanistan. It supported OEF until early 2007 when it began focusing full-time on the continuous bomber presence mission in the Pacific Theater. The squadron supported deployments in 2004, 2006, 2008, 2009 and again in 2011 to Andersen AFB, Guam.

In 2011, as part of Air Force Global Strike Command's Global Strike Challenge (successor to SAC's Bomb Comp), the 96th Bomb Squadron won three awards:

The Bartsch Trophy for best ECM Score beating 9 other B-52 squadrons/units,
The Mitchell Trophy for best bombing score (6 meter BDU-50, beating 19 other B-1, B-2 and B-52 squadrons/units), and
The Linebacker Trophy for best B-52 Squadron in 2011.

In 2020, the 96th Bomb Squadron was selected as the best strategic bomber squadron by U.S. Navy Adm. Charles Richard, commander of USSTRATCOM:

The Omaha Trophy for best strategic bomber squadron in 2020.

In 2023 the 96th Bomb Squadron deployed to the Pacific Theater and performed a flyover at Seoul’s Aerospace and Defense Exhibition, landing a B-52 in the Korean Peninsula for the first time in over 30 years.

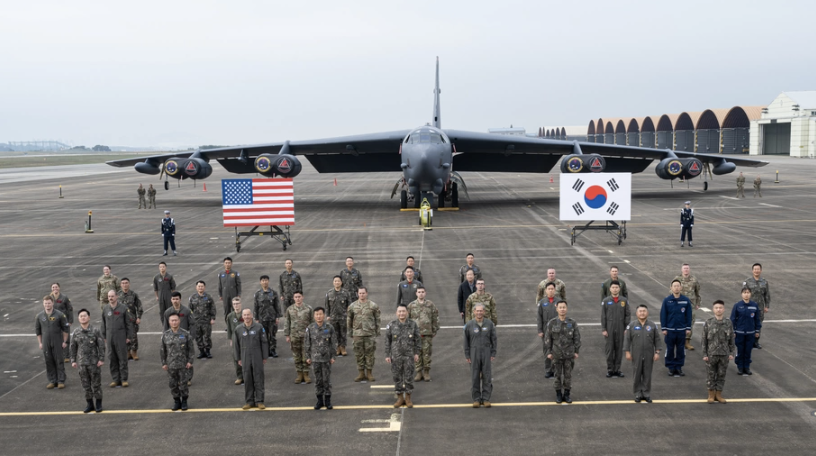
Service members from the U.S. Air Force and the Republic of Korea Air Force pose for a photo in front of a B-52H Stratofortress from the 96th Bomb Squadron in the Republic of Korea October 19, 2023

Targeting Pod footage depicting J-11 unsafely intercepting a U.S. Air Force B-52

Following the Korean exhibition, the squadron deployed to Andersen AFB to support Bomber Task Force missions. On one mission during this deployment, they were unsafely intercepted by a J-11 that came as close as 9.6 feet to a B-52 over the South China Sea. Targeting pod footage from this encounter was declassified and subsequently released.

== Lineage ==
- Organized as the 96th Aero Squadron (Day Bombardment) on 20 August 1917

Redesignated 96th Squadron (Bombardment) on 14 March 1921
Redesignated 96th Bombardment Squadron on 25 January 1923
Redesignated 96th Bombardment Squadron (Heavy) on 6 December 1939
Redesignated 96th Bombardment Squadron, Heavy c. 6 March 1944
Inactivated on 28 February 1946

- Redesignated 96th Bombardment Squadron, Very Heavy on 5 April 1946

Activated on 1 July 1947
Redesignated 96th Bombardment Squadron, Medium on 28 May 1948
Discontinued and inactivated on 1 April 1963

- Redesignated 96th Bomb Squadron on 28 September 1993

Activated on 1 October 1993

=== Assignments ===
- Post Headquarters, Kelly Field, 20 August 1917
- Unknown, 7 October 1917
- 1st Day Bombardment Group, September 1918
- Unknown, November 1918
- 1st Air Depot, AEF, 10 January-13 February 1919
- Unknown, 13 February–September 1919
- 1st Day Bombardment Group (later 2d Bombardment Group), 18 September 1919 – 28 February 1946 (attached to 1st Surveillance Group, 12 November 1919 - 10 January 1921, 1st Provisional Air Brigade, May–October 1921)
- 2d Bombardment Group, 1 July 1947 (attached to 2d Bombardment Wing after 10 February 1951)
- 2d Bombardment Wing, 16 June 1952 – 1 April 1963
- 2d Operations Group, 1 October 1993 – present

=== Stations ===
World War I

- Kelly Field, Texas, 20 August-7 October 1917
- Clermont-en-Argonne Airdrome, France, 16 November 1917
- Amanty Airdrome, France, 18 May 1918
- Maulan Aerodrome, France, 23 September 1918
- Colombey-les-Belles Airdrome, France, 10 January 1919
- St Denis de Pile, France, 13 February 1919
- Libourne, France, 12–16 April 1919

Inter-War period

- Mitchel Field, New York, 2 May 1919
- Ellington Field, Texas, 26 May 1919
- Camp Furlong, New Mexico, c. 28 June 1919
- Fort Bliss, Texas, 3 July 1919

Flight operated from Douglas Airport, Arizona, c. 10 August 1919-10 January 1920

- Kelly Field, Texas, 12 January 1920

Operated from Langley Field, Virginia, 20 May-26 October 1921

- Langley Field, Virginia, 30 June 1922

World War II

- Ephrata Army Air Base, Washington, 29 October 1942
- Glasgow Army Air Field, Montana, 29 November 1942 – 14 March 1943
- Navarin Airfield, Algeria, 25 April 1943
- Chateau-dun-du-Rhumel Airfield, Algeria, 27 April 1943
- Ain M'lila Airfield, Algeria, 17 June 1943
- Massicault Airfield, Tunisia, 30 July 1943
- Amendola Airfield, Italy, c. 10 December 1943
- Foggia Airfield, Italy, c. 20 October 1945 – 28 February 1946

United States Air Force

- Andrews Field, Maryland, 1 Jul 1947
- Davis-Monthan Field (later Davis-Monthan Air Force Base), Arizona, 24 Sep 1947
- Chatham Air Force Base, Georgia, 1 May 1949
- Hunter Air Force Base, Georgia, 29 September 1950 – 1 April 1963

Deployed at: RAF Bassingbourn, England, 4 May-24 September 1951
Deployed at: RAF Upper Heyford, England, 4 September-3 December 1952
Deployed at: Sidi Slimane Air Base, French Morocco, 11 August-20 September 1954 and 6 July-24 August 1956

- Barksdale Air Force Base, Louisiana, 1 October 1993 – present

=== Aircraft ===
- Breguet 14, 1918
- Airco DH.4, 1918
- Dayton-Wright DH-4, 1919-1928
- Caproni Ca.3, 1919-1928
- Handley Page 0/400, 1919-1928
- Martin NBS-1, 1919-1928
- Keystone LB-5, 1928-1932
- Keystone LB-7, 1928-1932
- Keystone B-3, 1928-1932
- Keystone B-5, 1928-1932
- Keystone B-6, 1932-1936
- Martin B-10, 1936-1942
- Douglas B-18 Bolo, 1936-1942
- North American B-25 Mitchell, 1936-1942
- Boeing B-17 Flying Fortress, 1936-1945
- Boeing B-29 Superfortress, 1947-1950
- Boeing B-50 Superfortress, 1949-1954
- Boeing B-47E Stratojet, 1954-1963
- Boeing B-52H Stratofortress, 1993–present

== See also ==
- List of American Aero Squadrons
- Robert D. Knapp
- Boeing B-17 Flying Fortress Units of the Mediterranean Theater of Operations
- List of B-29 Superfortress operators
- List of B-47 units of the United States Air Force
- List of B-52 Units of the United States Air Force
