= 72nd Test and Evaluation Squadron =

72d Test and Evaluation Squadron

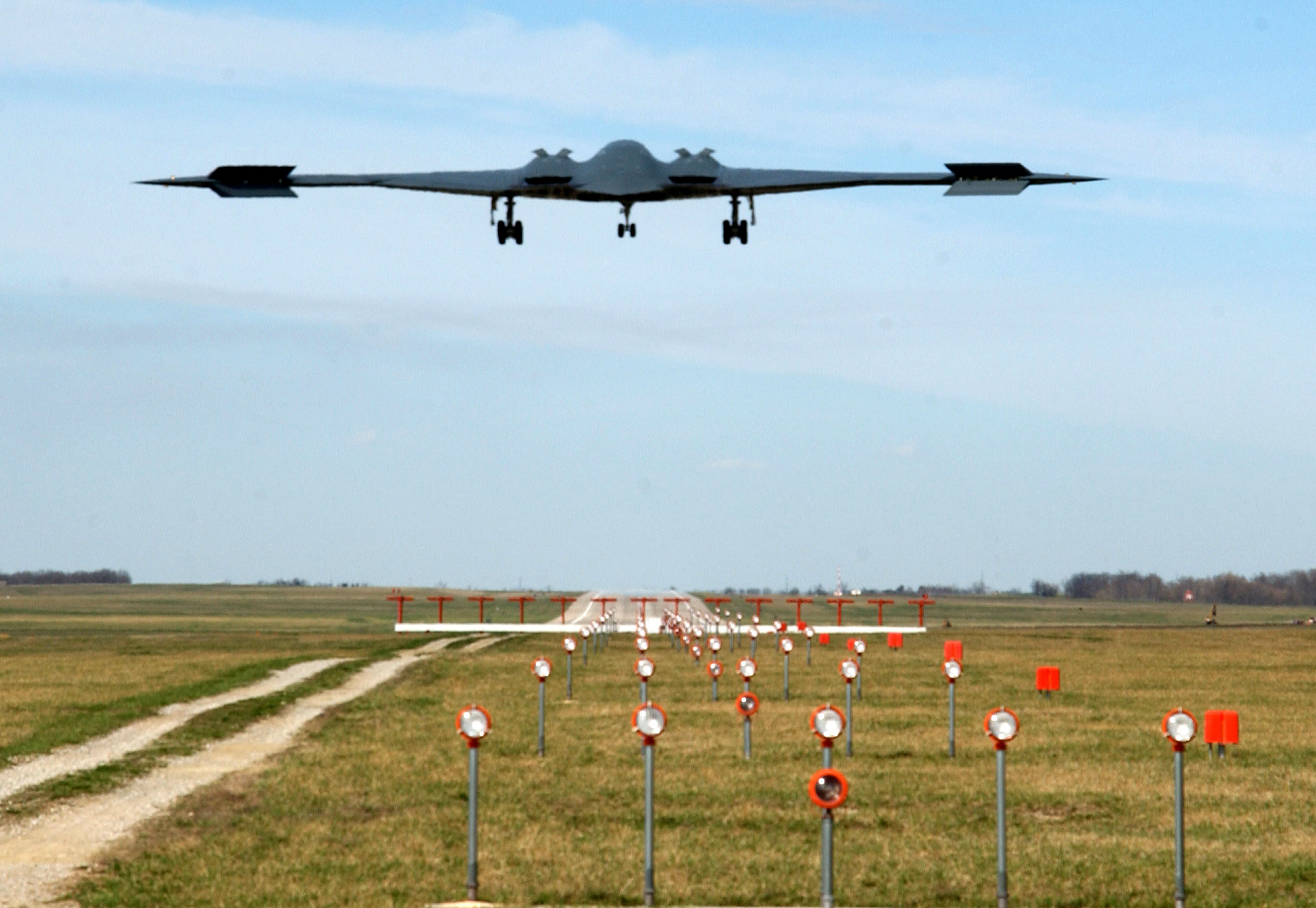
- B-2 Spirit landing at Whiteman AFB
- Active: 1918–1919; 1923–1947; 1947–1963; 1994–1996; 1998–present
- Country: United States
- Branch: United States Air Force
- Role: Weapon system testing and evaluation
- Part of: Air Combat Command
- Garrison/HQ: Whiteman Air Force Base
- Engagements: World War I; Southwest Pacific Theater
- Decorations: Distinguished Unit Citation; Navy Presidential Unit Citation; Air Force Outstanding Unit Award; Philippine Presidential Unit Citation

Commanders
- Notable commanders: Robert F. Travis

Insignia
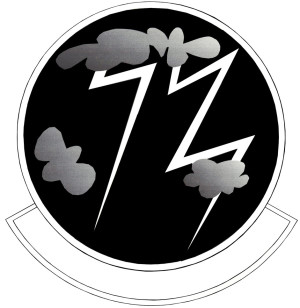
- 72d Test and Evaluation Squadron emblem (Note: Approved 14 February 1924. Description: Two bolts of lightning appearing from behind a thundercloud, the bolts forming more or less vaguely the figures "7" and "2", the lower end of the second bolt disappearing behind a second cloud. Black disc edged with white, white-to gray clouds, white bolts.)

The 72d Test and Evaluation Squadron is part of the 53d Wing at Eglin Air Force Base, Florida. The squadron is geographically separated but is operated from Whiteman Air Force Base, Missouri. It conducts testing and evaluation of the B-2 Spirit aircraft.

== Mission ==
The B-2 weapon system, which costs $44.6 billion, is tested and evaluated operationally by the squadron. The squadron assesses the B-2 weapons system's capability to meet all significant requirements and reports weapon system capabilities.

The unit provides experienced operations, maintenance, engineering, and analysis personnel who plan and conduct ground and flight tests, and analyze, evaluate, and report on the effectiveness and suitability of B-2 logistics support, tactics and survivability, foreign military exploitation, weapons and mission planning. The squadron reports results and conclusions to support DoD acquisition, deployment and employment decisions.

== History ==
=== World War I ===
The squadron was formed in Texas in early 1918. After a period of training and organization, it departed from New York in the late summer of 1918, arriving in France on 4 September. It stayed two weeks at the Air Service Replacement Concentration Barracks, St. Maixent, then transited through Delouze Aerodrome before reaching Colombey-les-Belles Airdrome where it worked for the 1st Air Depot as "Advance Section, Serv. of Supply Air Park Squadron". It remained in France after the armistice until June 1919, arriving back in New York and subsequently demobilized in July.

=== Interwar years ===
Reorganized in 1923 as a reconnaissance squadron, assigned to 5th Composite Group in Hawaii as part of the islands air defense organization. Assigned to Luke Field on Ford Island. Activities included training, participating in Army-Navy maneuvers, staging aerial reviews and sowing seeds from the air for the Territorial Forestry Division. In 1935, the squadron helped save the city of Hilo, Hawaii, during the eruption of the Mauna Loa volcano. Ten Keystone B-3 and Keystone B-4 bombers from the group's 23d and 72d Bombardment Squadrons dropped twenty 600-pound bombs around the volcano to divert molten lava away from the town.

=== World War II ===
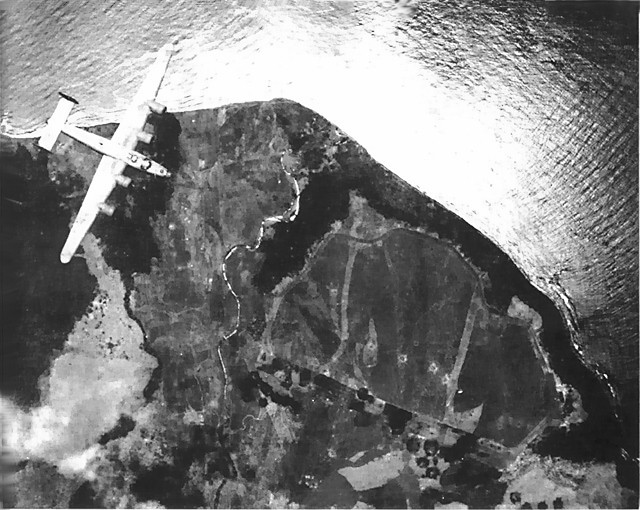
Cape Gloucester New Guinea airdrome as a Liberator saw it during pre-invasion bombing, December 1943

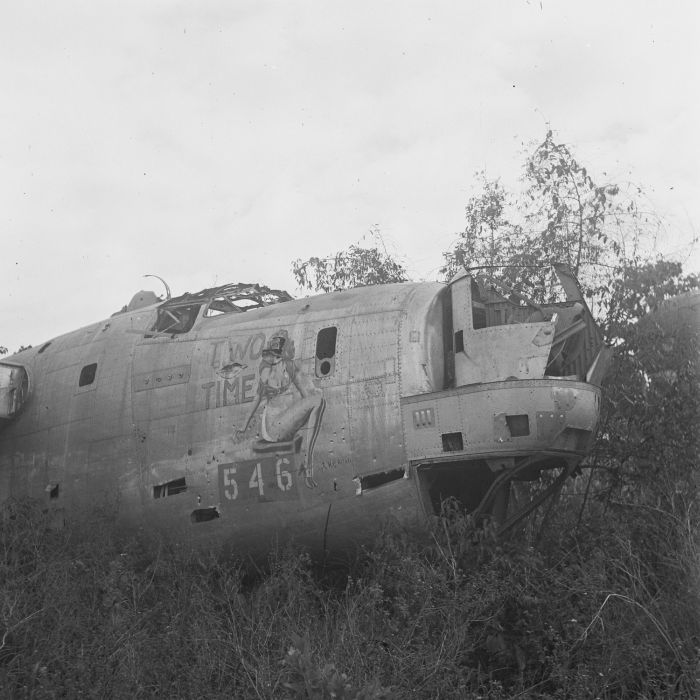
Pin-up girl painted on a dumped American World War Two aircraft. (Note: Aircraft is Consolidated B-24 Liberator, serial number 44-40546, Two Time.)

When the Navy moved its Pacific Fleet from San Diego to Pearl Harbor in 1939, the squadron moved to Hickam Field. It was equipped with Douglas B-18 Bolos. In late 1941, the squadron began replacing its B-18s with Boeing B-17 Flying Fortress aircraft. When the Japanese attacked military installations on the island of Oahu on 7 December 1941, the squadron suffered losses. Until December 1942, the squadron responded by patrolling the area around Hawaii to guard against another attack.

The squadron left Hawaii in November 1942 and operated in the South Pacific Theater. It converted to long-range Consolidated B-24 Liberators in 1943. The squadron flew long patrol and reconnaissance missions over the Solomon Islands and the Coral Sea. It attacked Japanese shipping off Guadalcanal, and raided airfields in the northern Solomons until August 1943. It then struck enemy bases and installations on Bougainville Island, New Britain, and New Ireland.

The squadron raided the heavily defended Japanese base on Woleai between mid-April and mid-May 1944, receiving a Distinguished Unit Citation 9dUC) for the action. It helped to neutralize enemy bases on Yap and in the Truk and Palau Islands in June through August 1944, preparatory to the invasion of Peleliu and Leyte. The 394th flew missions to the Netherlands East Indies. On 30 September 1944, it attacked oil facilities at Balikpapan, which were heavily defended by flak and fighters. It was awarded a second DUC for this action.

From October 1944 until the end of the war, it conducted raids on enemy bases and installations on Luzon, Ceram, Halmahera, and Formosa. It supported ground forces in the Philippines and Borneo and conducted patrols off the China coast. The squadron moved to Clark Field, Philippines in December 1945. Although all personnel had been withdrawn from the squadron in early 1946, it was not inactivated until March 1947.ref name=Maurer5BG/>

=== Strategic reconnaissance ===
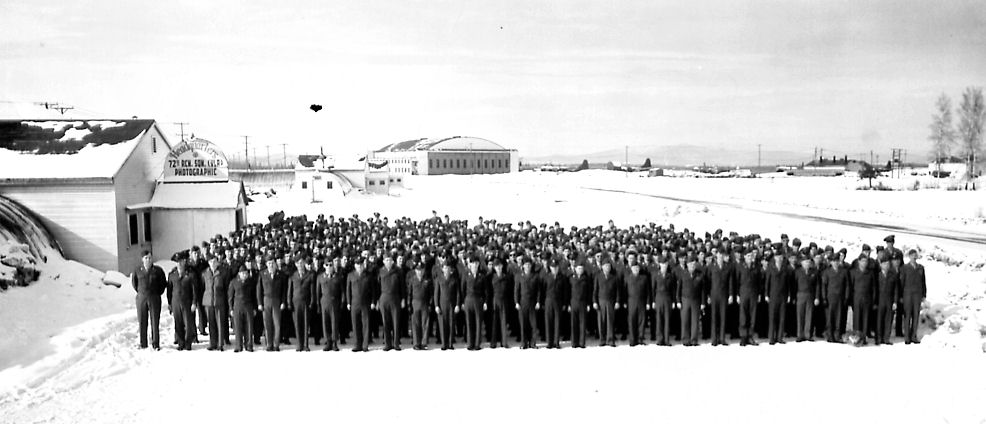
Squadron photo of the 72d Reconnaissance Squadron, 1948

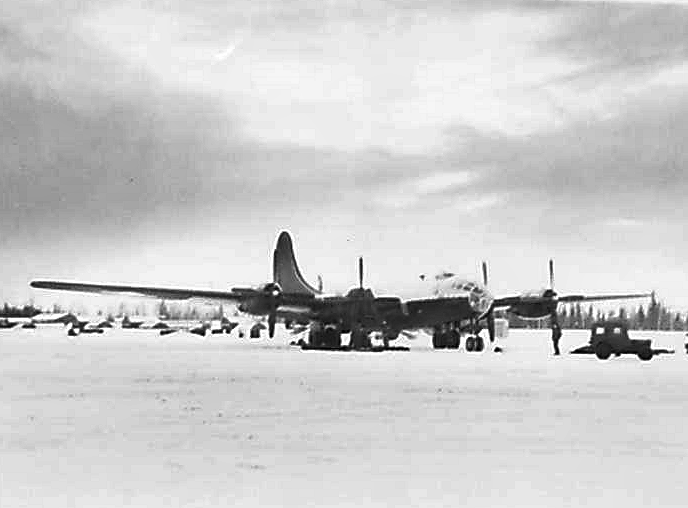
RB-29 on the ramp in the snow at Ladd AFB 1948

Reactivated at Ladd Field, Alaska in 1947 assuming the mission, personnel and equipment of the 46th Reconnaissance Squadron with a mission to conduct strategic reconnaissance operations over the Arctic. The squadron's reconnaissance missions included electronic and weather monitoring flights used to track Soviet activities in the area. Between 1948 and 1949 the Boeing RB-29 Superfortresses of the 72d conducted numerous photographic reconnaissance and ELINT missions over the Soviet Arctic and Far East. Equipped with cameras that enabled then to remain in international airspace, whilst photographing targets deep inside Soviet territory, the aircraft searched for evidence of Soviet military activity, but unsurprisingly, found little going on in the inhospitable Arctic wastes but nobody knew what was happening further inland. To investigate activity deeper inside the Soviet Union, some RB-29s were stripped of all unnecessary equipment, allowing them to increase their operating ceiling, and began overflying Soviet territory.

President Harry Truman, authorized the first overflight on 5 August 1948 when an RB-29 took off from Ladd AFB and, after routing over Siberia and spending over 19 hours in the air, eventually landed at Yokota Air Base, Japan. Even longer flights soon became routine with aircraft operating up to 35,000 ft, covering 5000 miles and remaining airborne for occasionally up to 30 hours. Although the Soviet Military was equipped rudimentary radar, copied from World War II US supplied equipment, large gaps existed in their radar coverage, particularly over the vast Arctic region. These gaps were soon identified and exploited by the RB-29s as they penetrated deeper inside the Soviet Union. Although they were detected on many occasions, none of the RB-29s was ever intercepted because the early MiG-15 was the only fighter with sufficient performance to reach these high-flying aircraft and none of the new fighters were then stationed in Siberia.

The most significant of these missions included one on 3 September 1949 which identified the first evidence of a successful explosion of a Soviet nuclear weapon in the Semipalatinsk test site in Eastern Kazakhstan on 29 August 1949.

=== Strategic bombardment ===
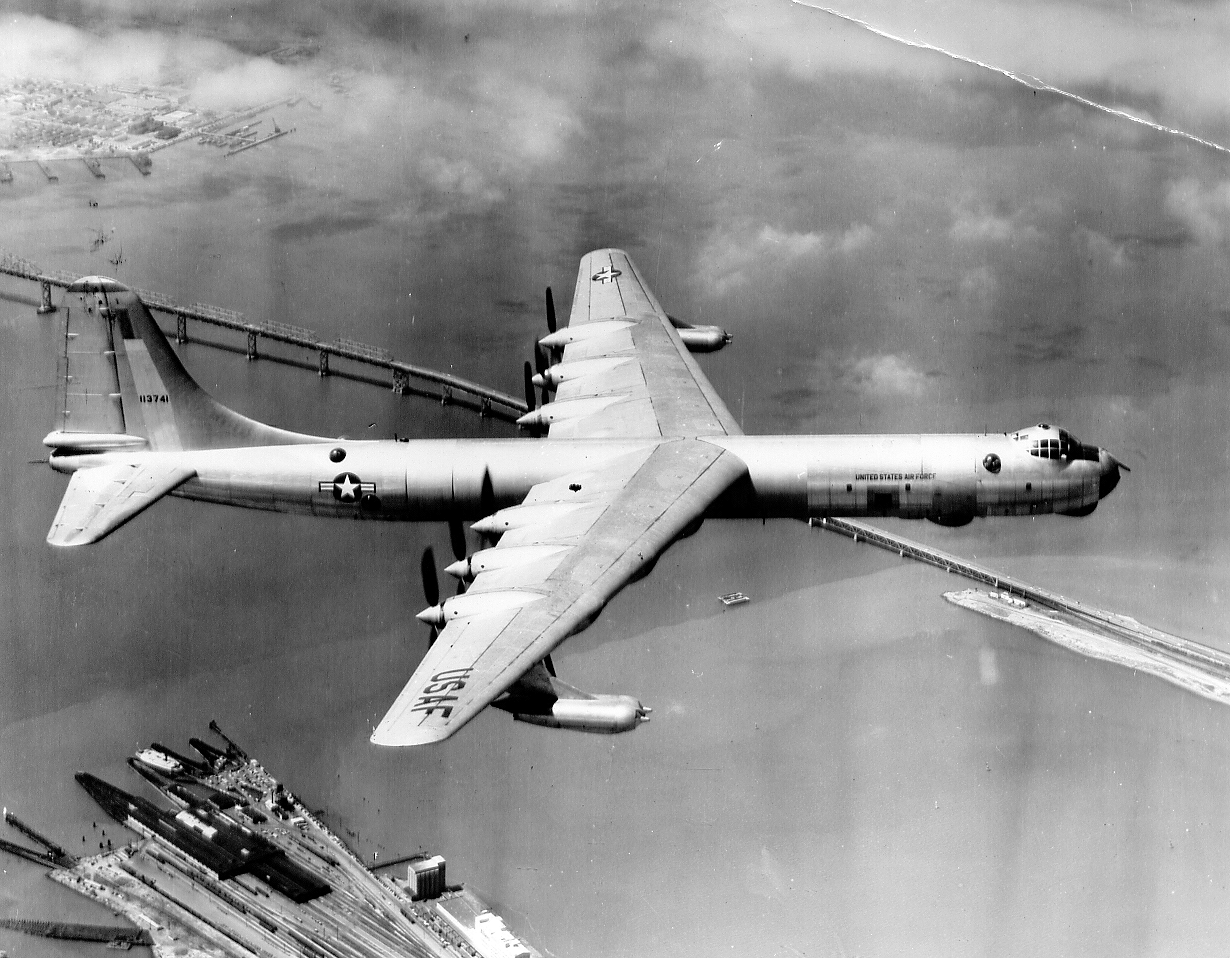
RB-36H flying over San Francisco Bay, 1954 (Note: Aircraft is Convair RB-36H-40-CF Peacemaker, serial 51–13741.)

Moved to the Continental United States in 1951, being re-equipped with Very Long Range RB-36H Peacemaker strategic reconnaissance bombers and assigned to the 5th Strategic Reconnaissance Wing at Fairfield-Suisun Air Force Base, California. The aircraft were equipped with four J47 jet engines and with fourteen K-17C, K-22A, K-38, and K-40 cameras. It also received some advanced electronics. Its normal crew was 22, which included 5 gunners to man the 16 M-24A-1 20-mm cannon. Conducted global strategic reconnaissance until 1955, conducting ELINT and Ferret missions along the east Asian coastline. Gradually shifting to bombardment training mission beginning in 1954 as the 72d Bombardment Squadron, Heavy, on 1 October 1955.

Flew B-36Js heavy bombers until their phaseout in 1958, being reassigned to the 4134th Strategic Wing, being re-equipped with Boeing B-52F Stratofortress intercontinental heavy bombers. Was reassigned to Mather Air Force Base, California by SAC to disperse its heavy bomber force. Conducted worldwide strategic bombardment training missions and providing nuclear deterrent. Was inactivated in 1963 when SAC inactivated its strategic wings, replacing them with permanent Air Force Wings. Squadron was inactivated with its aircraft, personnel and equipment being transferred to the 441st Bombardment Squadron.

Reactivated as a B-52H heavy bomb squadron at Minot Air Force Base, North Dakota in late 1994, but inactivated on 1 July 1996.

=== Test and evaluation ===
Reactivated as a B-2 Spirit stealth bomber evaluation squadron in 1998.

== Lineage ==
72d Aero Squadron

- Organized as the 72d Aero Squadron on 18 February 1918

Demobilized on 11 July 1919

- Reconstituted and consolidated with the 72d Bombardment Squadron' as the 72d Bombardment Squadron on 8 April 1924

72d Test and Evaluation Squadron

- Constituted as the 72d Bombardment Squadron on 6 February 1923
- Activated on 1 May 1923

Consolidated with the 72d Aero Squadron on 8 April 1924
Redesignated 72d Bombardment Squadron (Medium) on 6 December 1939
Redesignated 72d Bombardment Squadron (Heavy) on 20 November 1940
Redesignated 72d Bombardment Squadron, Heavy on 6 March 1944
Redesignated 72d Bombardment Squadron, Very Heavy on 30 April 1946
Inactivated on 10 March 1947

- Redesignated 72d Reconnaissance Squadron, Very Long Range, Photographic on 16 September 1947

Activated on 13 October 1947
Redesignated 72d Strategic Reconnaissance Squadron, Photographic on 23 February 1949
Redesignated 72d Strategic Reconnaissance Squadron, Heavy on 14 November 1950
Redesignated 72d Bombardment Squadron, Heavy on 1 October 1955
Discontinued, and inactivated on 1 February 1963

- Redesignated 72d Bomb Squadron on 30 November 1994

Activated on 1 December 1994
Inactivated on 1 July 1996

- Redesignated 72d Test and Evaluation Squadron on 1 November 1998

Activated on 20 November 1998

=== Assignments ===
- Unknown, 18 February–September 1918
- 1st Air Depot, September 1918 – June 1919
- Unknown, June-11 July 1919
- 5th Composite Group, 1 May 1923
- 19th Bombardment Group (attached to 5th Composite Group after 24 June 1932)
- 5th Bombardment Group (later 5th Reconnaissance Group), 12 October 1938 – 10 March 1947
- Alaskan Air Command, 13 October 1947
- 311th Air Division, 1 April 1949
- 5th Strategic Reconnaissance Group, 28 June 1949 (attached to 5th Strategic Reconnaissance Wing after 10 February 1951)
- 5th Strategic Reconnaissance Wing (later 5th Bombardment Wing), 16 June 1952
- 4134th Strategic Wing, 1 July 1958 – 1 February 1963
- 5th Operations Group, 1 December 1994 – 1 July 1996
- 53d Test and Evaluation Group, 20 November 1998
- 753rd Test and Evaluation Group, 1 October 2021 – present

=== Stations ===
- Waco, Texas, 18 February 1918
- Rich Field, Texas, 23 February 1918
- Garden City, New York, 16 July-13 August 1918
- St. Maixent Replacement Barracks, France, 4 September 1918
- Delouze Aerodrome, France, 20 September 1918
- Colombey-les-Belles Airdrome, France, 30 September 1918 – June 1919

Detachment at: Behonne Aerodrome, France, 4 October-1 December 1918 (Advance Air Park)

- Mitchel Field, New York, c. 29 June-11 July 1919
- Luke Field, Hawaii, 1 May 1923
- Hickam Field, Hawaii, 4 January 1939
- Bellows Field, Hawaii, 11 December 1941 – 18 September 1942
- Pallikulo Bay Airfield, Espiritu Santo, New Hebrides, 24 September 1942

Operated from: Henderson Field (Guadalcanal), Guadalcanal, Solomon Islands, 4 October 1942 – 8 August 1943; 7 October-15 November 1943; 13 December 1943 – 27 January 1944

- Munda Airfield, New Georgia, Solomon Islands, 9 January 1944
- Momote Airfield, Los Negros, Admiralty Islands, 15 April 1944
- Wakde Airfield, Netherlands East Indies, c. 19 August 1944
- Kornasoren (Yebrurro) Airfield, Noemfoor, Schouten Islands, 27 September 1944
- Wama Airfield, Morotai, Netherlands East Indies, 24 October 1944
- Guiuan Airfield, Samar, Philippines, 20 March 1945
- Clark Field, Luzon, Philippines, December 1945-10 March 1947
- Ladd Army Airfield, Alaska, 13 October 1947
- Mountain Home Air Force Base, Idaho, 28 June 1949
- Fairfield-Suisun Air Force Base (later Travis Air Force Base), California, 9 November 1949

Deployed at: RAF Sculthorpe, England, 31 May −15 November 1950
Deployed at: Andersen Air Force Base, Guam, 14 January-12 April 1955

- Mather Air Force Base, California, 1 July 1958 – 1 February 1963
- Minot Air Force Base, North Dakota, 1 December 1994 – 1 July 1996
- Whiteman Air Force Base, Missouri, 20 November 1998 – present

=== Aircraft ===
- DH-4 (1923–1929)
- NBS-1 (1923–1929)
- LB-5 (1927–1929)
- Keystone B-4 (1929–1936)
- Keystone B-5 (1929–1936)
- LB-6 (1929–1936)
- B-12 (1936–1938)
- B-18 Bolo (1938–1942)
- Boeing B-17 Flying Fortress (1941, 1942–1943)
- Consolidated B-24 Liberator (1943–1945)
- Boeing B-29 Superfortress (1947–1951)
- Boeing F-13 (RB-29) Superfortress (1947–1948)
- Convair RB-36 Peacemaker (1951–1958)
- Convair B-36 Peacemaker (1955–1958)
- Boeing B-52 Stratofortress (1958–1963, 1994–1996)
- B-2 Spirit (1998–present)

=== Operations ===
- World War I
- World War II

== See also ==
- List of American Aero Squadrons
- List of B-52 Units of the United States Air Force
- Kee Bird
