= Keystone B-3 =

Bomber aircraft family by Keystone

B-3A
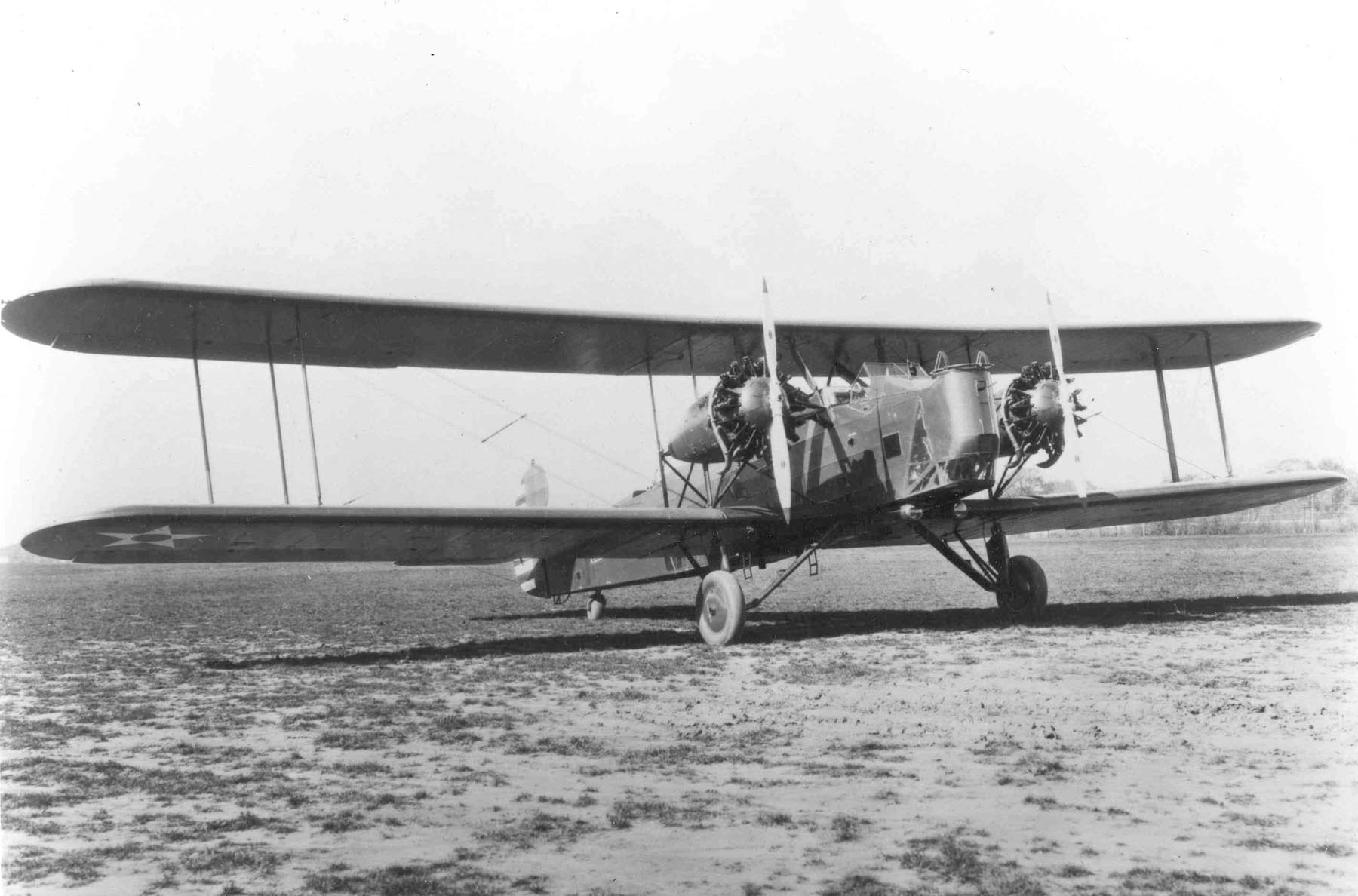
- Keystone B-3A (S/N 30-281), the first B-3A built.

General information
- Type: Bomber
- Manufacturer: Keystone Aircraft
- Status: Retired
- Primary user: United States Army Air Corps
- Number built: 63 B-3A/B-5

History
- Retired: 1940
- Variants: Keystone B-4, B-5 & B-6

The Keystone B-3A was a bomber aircraft developed for the United States Army Air Corps by Keystone Aircraft in the late 1920s.

== Design and development ==
The B-3 was originally ordered as the LB-10A (a single-tail modification of the Keystone LB-6), but the Army dropped the LB- 'light bomber' designation in 1930.

Although the performance of the B-3A was hardly better than that of the bombers flown at the end of World War I, it had come a long way in terms of flight safety.

== Operational history ==
The B-3A was a member of the last family of biplanes operated by the US Army; it remained in service until 1940. A few years after it was first produced, the introduction of all-metal monoplanes rendered it almost completely obsolete.

== Variants ==
LB-10
The last of the 17 LB-6s ordered (S/N 29-27) was converted with a re-designed single fin and rudder and two 525 hp Wright R-1750E engines. Delivered to Wright Field on 7 July 1929, it was wrecked on 12 November 1929.
LB-10A
This version used Pratt and Whitney R-1690-3 Hornet engines and was slightly smaller, in both wingspan and length. A total of 63 were ordered (S/N 30-281/343). All were re-designated as the B-3A before any deliveries were made, with the final 27 built as B-5A with Wright engines.
B-3A
Ordered as LB-10A, 36 delivered as B-3A (S/N 30-281/316). The first aircraft was delivered in October 1930.
B-5A
Ordered as B-3A, re-engined with Wright R-1750-3 Cyclone engines, 27 built (S/N 30-317/343).

== Operators ==
United States

- United States Army Air Corps
  - 2d Bombardment Group, Langley Field, Virginia
    - 20th Bomb Squadron – operated B-3A and B-5A 1931–1932
    - 49th Bomb Squadron – operated B-3A and B-5A 1931–1932
    - 96th Bomb Squadron – operated B-3A and B-5A 1931–1932
  - 4th Composite Group, Nichols Field, Luzon, Philippines
    - 28th Bomb Squadron – operated B-3A 1932–1937
    - 2nd Observation Squadron- operated B-3A 1938–1940
  - 5th Composite Group, Luke Field, Territory of Hawaii
    - 23d Bomb Squadron – operated B-5A 1932–1937
    - 72d Bomb Squadron – operated B-5A 1932–1936
  - 6th Composite Group, France Field, Panama Canal Zone
    - 25th Bomb Squadron – operated B-3A 1932–1936
  - 7th Bombardment Group, March Field, California
    - 9th Bomb Squadron – operated B-3A 1931–1934
    - 11th Bomb Squadron – operated B-3A 1931–1934
    - 31st Bomb Squadron – operated B-3A 1931–1934
  - 19th Bombardment Group, Rockwell Field, California
    - 30th Bomb Squadron – operated B-3A 1932–1936
    - 32d Bomb Squadron – operated B-3A 1932–1935
  - Air Corps Advanced Flying School, Kelly Field, Texas
    - 42d Bomb Squadron – operated B-3A and B-5A 1935–1936

Philippines

- Philippine Army Air Corps
  - 10th Bombardment Squadron

== Specifications (B-3A) ==
General characteristics

- Crew: 5
- Length: 48 ft 10 in (14.9 m)
- Wingspan: 74 ft 8 in (22.8 m)
- Height: 15 ft 9 in (4.8 m)
- Wing area: 1,145 sq ft (106.4 m^{2})
- Empty weight: 7,705 lb (3,495 kg)
- Gross weight: 12,952 lb (5,875 kg)
- Powerplant: 2 × Pratt & Whitney R-1690-3 radial engines, 525 hp (392 kW) each

Performance

- Maximum speed: 114 mph (183 km/h, 98 kn)
- Cruise speed: 98 mph (158 km/h, 85 kn)
- Range: 860 mi (1,400 km, 760 nmi)
- Service ceiling: 12,700 ft (3,870 m)
- Rate of climb: 530 ft/min (2.7 m/s)
- Wing loading: 11.31 lb/sq ft (55.42 kg/m^{2})
- Power/mass: 0.0811 hp/lb (133 W/kg)

Armament

- Guns: 3 × .30 in (7.62 mm) machine guns
- Bombs: 2,500 lb (1,100 kg); 4,000 lb (1,800 kg) on short runs

== See also ==
Related development

- Keystone LB-6
- Keystone B-4
- Keystone B-5
- Keystone B-6

Related lists

- List of bomber aircraft
- List of military aircraft of the United States
