= 23rd Bomb Squadron =

US Air Force unit

23rd Bomb Squadron

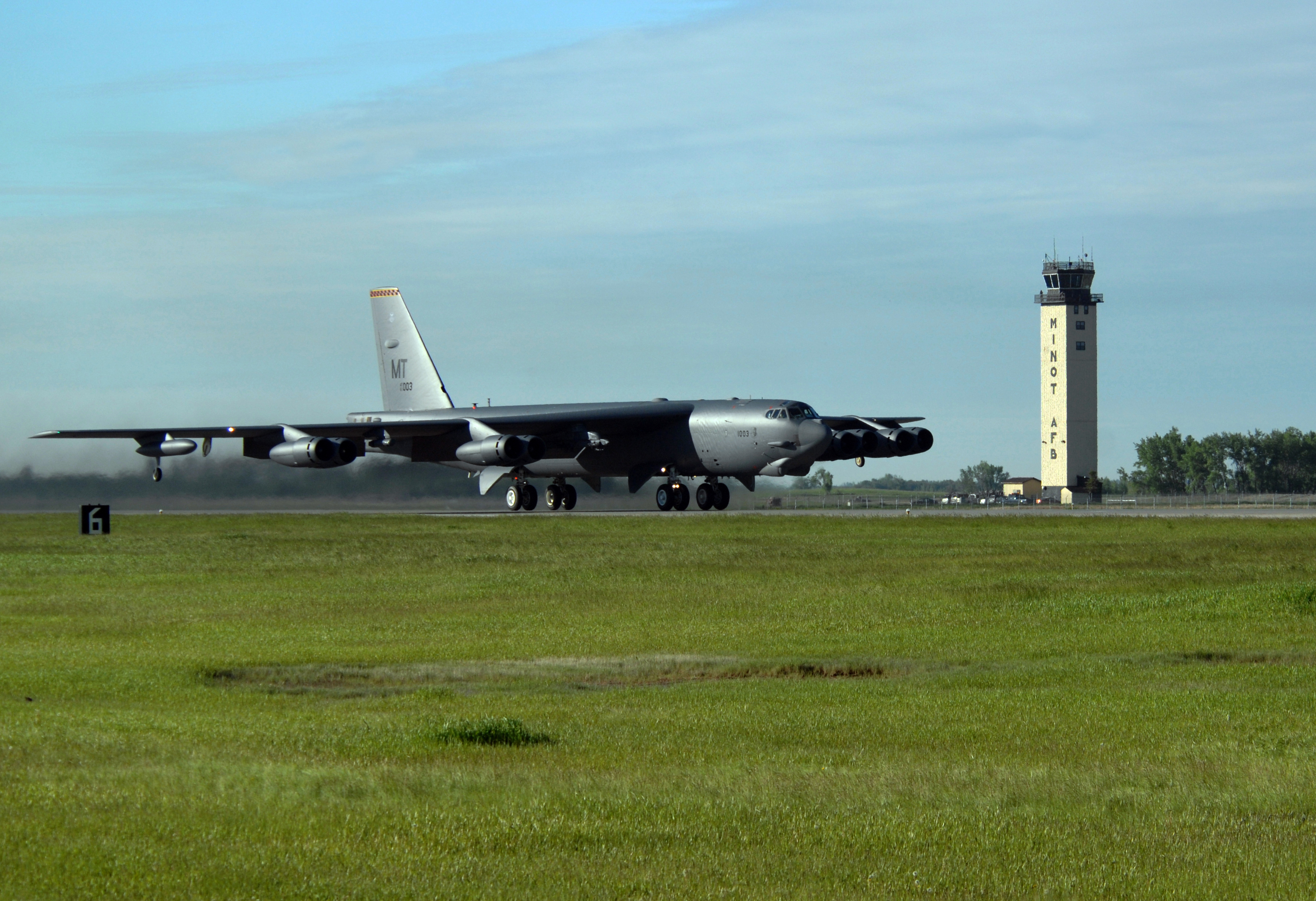
- Squadron B-52H Stratofortress landing at Minot AFB
- Active: 1917–1919; 1921–1947; 1947–present
- Country: United States
- Branch: United States Air Force
- Role: Strategic bombing
- Part of: Global Strike Command
- Garrison/HQ: Minot Air Force Base
- Nickname: Barons
- Colors: Red/yellow
- Engagements: World War I Southwest Pacific Theater
- Decorations: Distinguished Unit Citation; Navy Presidential Unit Citation; Air Force Outstanding Unit Award with Combat "V" Device; Air Force Outstanding Unit Award; Philippine Presidential Unit Citation

Insignia
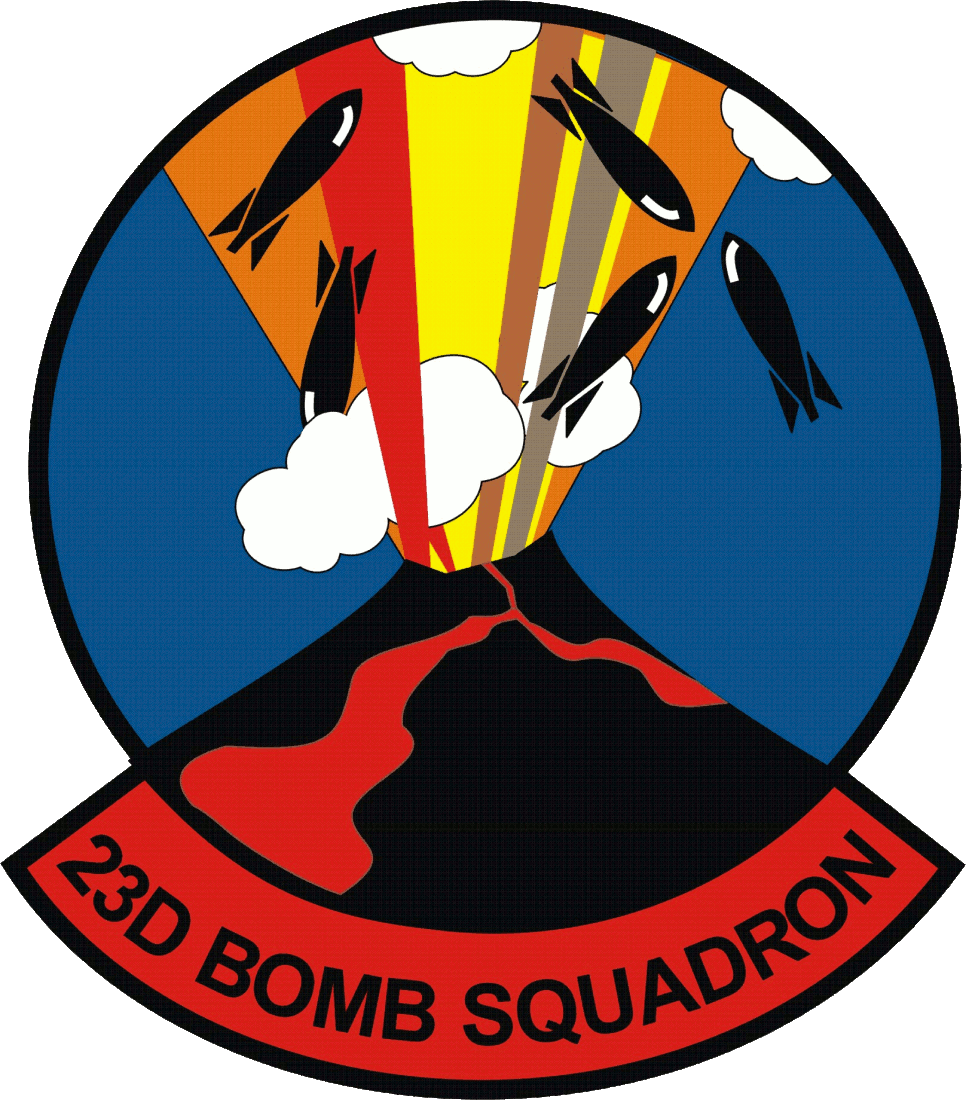
- 23rd Bomb Squadron emblem (Note: Approved 30 September 1931, reinstated 13 January 1994. Description: On a blue disk, a volcano in black silhouette with red lava flowing from the crater. Extending upward therefrom and intermingled with clouds, futuristic, vari-colored rays from yellow to red; in front thereof five dropped bombs, two on the dexter, three on the sinister side. The volcano represents the station, as well as the destructive force of the bombardment unit as represented by the aerial bombs. The arrangement of the bombs alludes to the number of the squadron. On 27 December 1935 the unit was tasked to drop twenty 600-pound bombs in the path of the flow of lava from Mauna Loa volcano, thus saving the city of Hilo, Hawaii, from destruction. Although the original emblem was used after the squadron returned to the bombardment mission in 1955, it was not officially restored until 1994.)

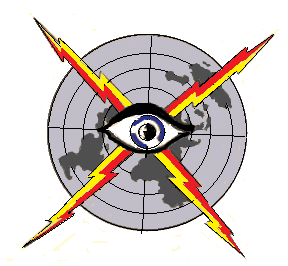
- 23rd Strategic Reconnaissance Squadron emblem (Note: Approved 12 May 1952. Description: Over a stylized representation of the globe (water areas light gray, land areas dark gray, outlined black), lightning bolts, crossed, red and yellow, surmounted by a conventualized human eye (lids black, eyeball white, iris[] blue, and pupil black))

The 23rd Bomb Squadron is a United States Air Force unit, assigned to the 5th Bomb Wing. It is stationed at Minot Air Force Base, North Dakota. The mission of the squadron is to fly the Boeing B-52H Stratofortress strategic bomber. The men and women of the "Bomber Barons" stand ready to project global power on a daily basis in both conventional and nuclear warfare.

The squadron is one of the oldest in the United States Air Force, dating to 16 June 1917, when it was organized at Kelly Field, Texas. It deployed to England as part of the American Expeditionary Forces, being engaged as an aircraft repair squadron during World War I. The squadron saw combat during World War II, and became part of the Strategic Air Command (SAC) during the Cold War.

== History ==
=== World War I ===
Originally organized at Camp Kelly, Texas on 16 June 1917 as the 18th Aero Squadron but redesignated the 23rd Aero Squadron six days later. Arriving in late July, 1918, in Britain, it started training before going to France, where it arrived on Armistice day. It was stationed at the Air Service Replacement Concentration Barracks St. Maixent Replacement Barracks until c. 29 January 1919, then moved to Saint-Nazaire, from where it sailed back to US on 20 February. The squadron arrived at the port of embarkation in March and was demobilized there.

=== Inter-war years ===
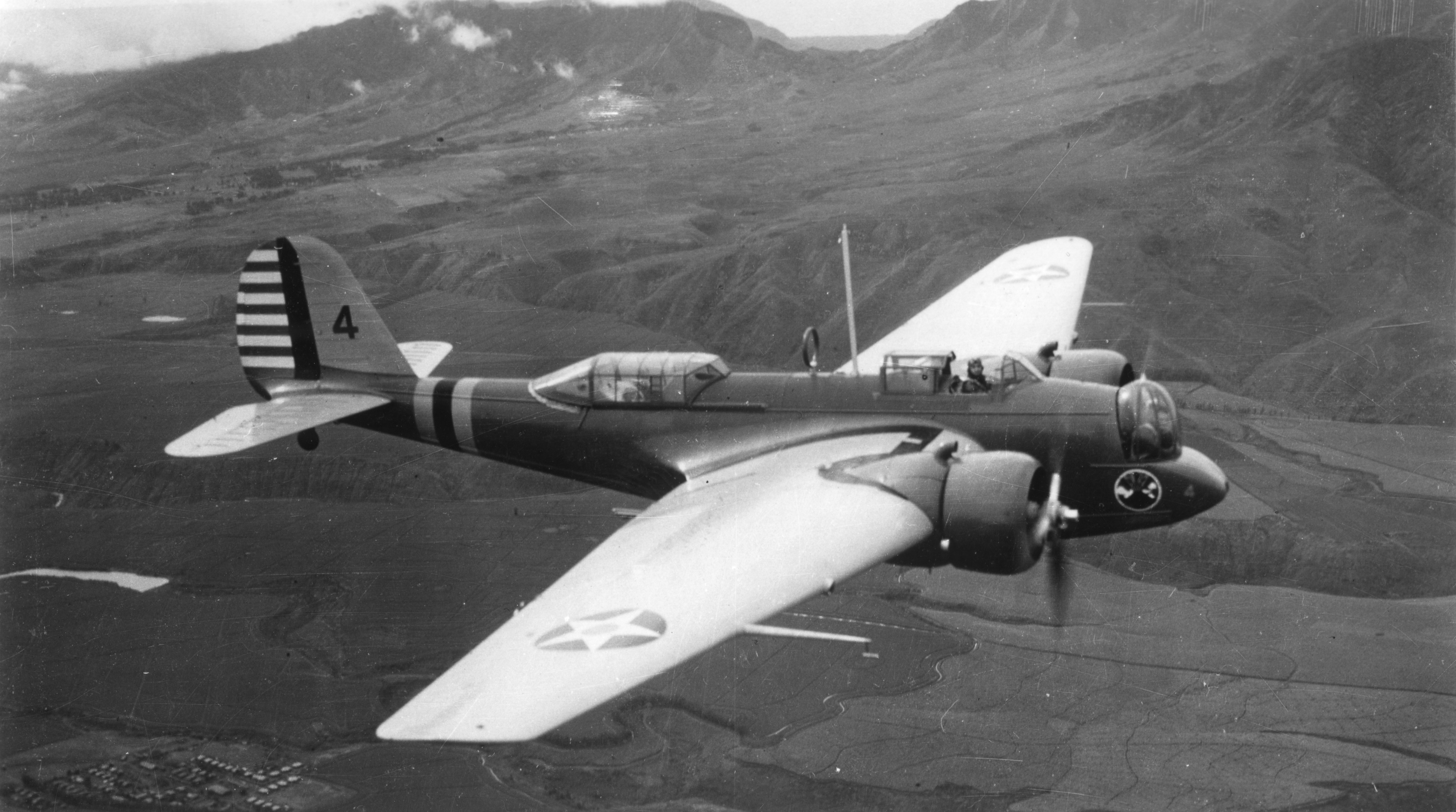
A Martin B-10 of the 23d Bombardment Squadron taken in 1941 over Oahu, Hawaii.

The 23rd Bombardment Squadron was born in 1921 and in April 1924 was consolidated with the World War I 23rd Aero Squadron. It spent the decades of the 1920s and 1930s stationed in Hawaii. There, the squadron flew a number of bomber types, most notably the Keystone bomber series and later the Douglas B-18 Bolo. It was during the squadron's stay in Hawaii that the event signified by the squadron emblem took place. On 27 December 1935, the Mauna Loa volcano on the island of Hawaii erupted, threatening the city of Hilo. Six Keystones of the 23rd used precision bombing tactics to drop twenty 600-pound bombs in the path of the volcano's lava flow, thus saving the city of Hilo by diverting the lava away from the city.

=== World War II ===
In late 1941, the squadron began replacing its B-18s with Boeing B-17 Flying Fortress aircraft. When the Japanese attacked military installations on the island of Oahu on 7 December 1941, the squadron suffered losses. Until December 1942, the squadron responded by patrolling the area around Hawaii to guard against another attack.

The squadron left Hawaii in November 1942 and operated in the South Pacific Theater. It converted to long-range Consolidated B-24 Liberators in 1943. The squadron flew long patrol and reconnaissance missions over the Solomon Islands and the Coral Sea. It attacked Japanese shipping off Guadalcanal, and raided airfields in the northern Solomons until August 1943. It then struck enemy bases and installations on Bougainville Island, New Britain, and New Ireland.

The squadron raided the heavily defended Japanese base on Woleai between mid-April and mid-May 1944, receiving a Distinguished Unit Citation 9dUC) for the action. It helped to neutralize enemy bases on Yap and in the Truk and Palau Islands in June through August 1944, preparatory to the invasion of Peleliu and Leyte. The 394th flew missions to the Netherlands East Indies. On 30 September 1944, it attacked oil facilities at Balikpapan, which were heavily defended by flak and fighters. It was awarded a second DUC for this action.

From October 1944 until the end of the war, it conducted raids on enemy bases and installations on Luzon, Ceram, Halmahera, and Formosa. It supported ground forces in the Philippines and Borneo and conducted patrols off the China coast. The squadron moved to Clark Field, Philippines in December 1945. Although all personnel had been withdrawn from the squadron in early 1946, it was not inactivated until March 1947.

=== Cold War ===
After a brief period in the Far East after the war, the 23rd Strategic Reconnaissance Squadron relocated to Travis Air Force Base, Calif ornia, in 1949. There, the squadron flew global strategic reconnaissance missions with Boeing RB-29 Superfortresses from 1949 to 1951, Convair RB-36F Peacemakers from 1951 to 1953, and RB-36Hs from 1953 to 1955. On 1 October 1955, the squadron was again redesignated the 23rd Bombardment Squadron and reverted to training for long range nuclear strike missions with the same RB-36Hs. On 13 February 1959, the 23rd entered the jet age when it received its first Boeing B-52G Stratofortress and also entered the missile age, as the B-52Gs were equipped with the AGM-28 Hound Dog standoff missile and the ADM-20 Quail decoy missile. The squadron flew the B-52G from Travis until July 1968.

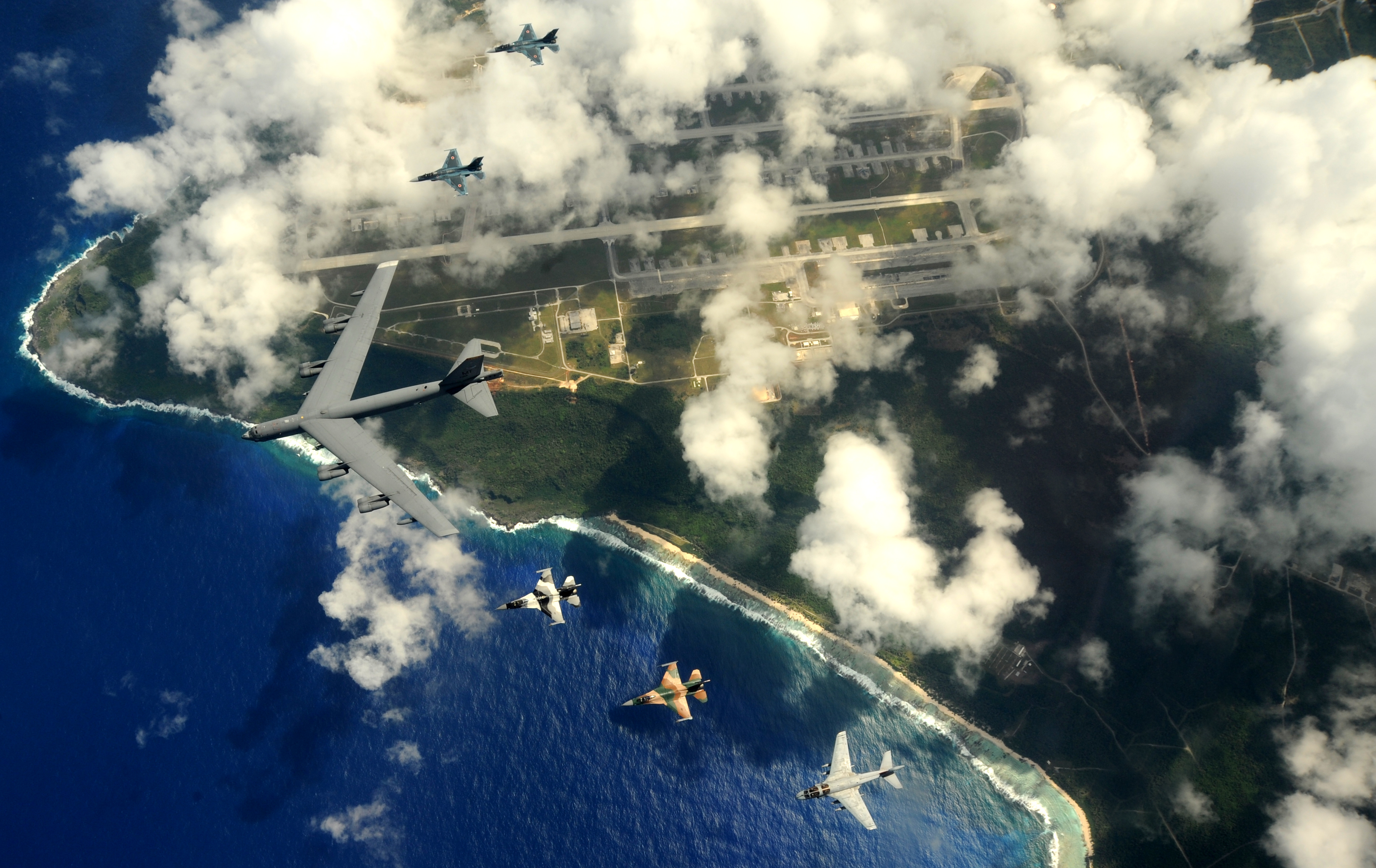
A B-52H with a Navy EA-6B Prowler and Japanese F-2-fighters during exercise Cope North 09–1 in February 2009 over Andersen Air Force Base

On 25 July 1968, the 23rd moved, without personnel or equipment, to Minot Air Force Base, North Dakota, where it absorbed the personnel, equipment, and B-52H bombers of the inactivating 720th Bombardment Squadron. The 23rd has been combat ready in B-52Hs since that time, continuously adding improvements in avionics, weapons, and tactics to its arsenal. In 1973, the squadron was the first unit to receive the AGM-69 SRAM (Short Range Attack Missile). In 1980, the 23rd gained the offensive avionics system, and led Strategic Air Command's venture into modern conventional war fighting as the lead unit for the Strategic Projection Force, in support of the U.S. Rapid Deployment Force. During the 1980s, the squadron pioneered night vision goggle tactics. The 23rd added the AGM-86B Air Launched Cruise Missile in 1989 and the AGM-129 Advanced Cruise Missile in 1994.

=== Post-Cold War ===
The squadron, along with other bomber units provide aircraft and personnel for regular rotational deployments to Andersen Air Force Base, Guam part of the U.S. Pacific Command's continuous bomber presence since 2004.

July 2012 see the 23rd Bomb Squadron deploy aircraft and personnel to Nellis AFB for Exercise Red Flag 12–4.

June 2016 three of the unit's B-52H bombers deployed to RAF Fairford for NATO Maritime exercise "BALTOPS" and for JTAC (Joint Terminal Attack Controller) exercise "Saber Strike".

26 March 2019 the 23rd BS assigned to the 23rd Expeditionary Bomber Squadron deployed two B-52 Stratofortresses from Andersen Air Force Base, Guam, to Royal Australian Air Force Base Darwin, Australia to participate in the biennial exercise Diamond Shield 2019.

== Lineage ==
23rd Aero Squadron

- Organized as the 18th Aero Squadron on 16 June 1917 (Note: Another 18th Aero Squadron was activated at Rockwell Field, California on 20 August 1917. Maurer, Combat Squadrons, pp. 499–500. It is not related to the first 18th Aero Squadron, and was last active as the 908th Expeditionary Air Refueling Squadron.)

Redesignated 23rd Aero Squadron (Repair) on 22 June 1917
Demobilized on 22 March 1919
Reconstituted and consolidated with the 23rd Bombardment Squadron on 8 April 1924

23rd Bomb Squadron

- Authorized as the 23rd Squadron on 30 August 1921

Organized on 1 October 1921
Redesignated 23rd Bombardment Squadron on 25 January 1923
Consolidated with the 23rd Aero Squadronon 8 April 1924
Redesignated 23rd Bombardment Squadron (Medium) on 6 December 1939
Redesignated 23rd Bombardment Squadron (Heavy) on 20 November 1940
Redesignated 23rd Bombardment Squadron, Heavy on 6 March 1944
Redesignated 23rd Bombardment Squadron, Very Heavy on 30 April 1946
Inactivated on 10 March 1947
Redesignated 23rd Reconnaissance Squadron, Very Long Range, Photographic on 16 September 1947
Activated on 20 October 1947
Redesignated 23rd Strategic Reconnaissance Squadron, Photographic on 16 June 1949
Redesignated 23rd Strategic Reconnaissance Squadron, Heavy on 14 November 1950
Redesignated 23rd Bombardment Squadron, Heavy on 1 October 1955
Redesignated 23rd Bomb Squadron on 1 September 1991

=== Assignments ===
- Unknown, 16 June 1917 – 22 March 1919
- Ninth Corps Area, 1 October 1921
- 5th Group (Observation) (later 5th Group (Pursuit and Bombardment); 5th Group (Composite), 5th Composite Group), 29 March 1922
- 19th Bombardment Group, 8 May 1929 (attached to 5th Composite Group (later 5th Bombardment Group))
- 5th Bombardment Group, 12 October 1938 – 10 March 1947
- 5th Reconnaissance Group, (later 5th Strategic Reconnaissance Group), 20 October 1947 (attached to 71st Tactical Reconnaissance Wing, 18–24 August 1948; 32d Composite Wing, 24 August 1948 – 16 March 1949; 55th Strategic Reconnaissance Wing, 1–17 June 1949; 5th Strategic Reconnaissance Wing after 10 February 1951)
- 5th Strategic Reconnaissance Wing (later 5th Bombardment Wing), 16 June 1952
- 5th Operations Group, 1 September 1991 – present

=== Stations ===
- Camp Kelly (later Kelly Field), Texas, 16 June 1917
- Hazelhurst Field, New York, 5 September 1917 – 6 July 1918
- Thetford Airdrome, England, c. 25 July 1918

Detachments at Hucknall Torkard and Salisbury, c. 18 August-c. 5 November 1918

- Duxford Aerodrome, England, 2 September 1918
- Codford Airdrome, England, 5 November 1918
- Cherbourg Naval Base, France, 11 November 1918
- St. Maixent Replacement Barracks, France, 18 November 1918
- Saint-Nazaire, France, c. 29 January-20 February 1919
- Garden City, New York, c. 8–22 March 1919
- March Field, California, 1 October 1921 – 21 March 1922
- Luke Field, Hawaii, 29 March 1922
- Hickam Field, Hawaii, 1 January 1939
- Mokuleia Airfield, Hawaii, 24 March–3 November 1942
- Pallikulo Bay Airfield, Espiritu Santo, New Hebrides, 1 December 1942 – 3 January 1944

Air echelon operated from Henderson Field, Guadalcanal, Solomon Islands, 31 March-24 August 1943, and 21 October-7 December 1943

- Munda Airfield, New Georgia, Solomon Islands, 9 January 1944
- Momote Airfield, Los Negros, Admiralty Islands, 16 April 1944
- Wakde Airfield, Netherlands East Indies, c. 20 August 1944
- Kornasoren Airfield, Noemfoor, Schouten Islands, c. 30 September 1944
- Wama Airfield, Morotai, Netherlands East Indies, c. 16 October 1944
- Guiuan Airfield, Samar, Philippines, 20 February 1945
- Clark Field, Luzon, Philippines, December 1945 – 10 March 1947
- Clark Field, Luzon, Philippines, 20 October 1947
- Kadena Air Base, Okinawa, 15 May 1948
- Yokota Air Base, Japan, 16 March-2 May 1949
- Fairfield-Suisun Air Force Base, California, 19 May 1949
- Topeka Air Force Base (later Forbes AFB), Kansas, 1 June 1949
- Mountain Home Air Force Base, Idaho, 25 June 1949
- Fairfield-Suisun Air Force Base (later Travis AFB), California, 1 November 1949 (deployed to Andersen Air Force Base, Guam, 14 January-12 April 1955
- Minot Air Force Base, North Dakota, 25 July 1968 – present

=== Aircraft ===
- Martin NBS-1, 1922–1929
- Curtiss JN-6, 1922–1929
- Dayton-Wright DH-4, 1922–1929
- Keystone B-4, 1929–1937
- Keystone B-5, 1929–1937
- Keystone LB-6, 1929–1937
- Martin B-12, 1937–1939
- Douglas B-18 Bolo, 1938–1942
- Boeing B-17 Flying Fortress, 1941–1943, 1947–1948
- Consolidated B-24 Liberator, 1943–1945
- Curtiss C-46 Commando, 1947–1948
- Boeing FB-17 Flying Fortress, 1947–1948
- Boeing F-2 Flying Fortress, 1947–1948
- Boeing RB-29 Superfortress, 1948–1951
- Convair RB-36 Peacekeeper, 1951–1958
- Convair B-36 Peacekeeper, 1955–1958
- Boeing B-52 Stratofortress, 1959–present

== See also ==
- List of American Aero Squadrons
- List of B-52 Units of the United States Air Force
