= Keystone B-6 =

Biplane bomber of the United States Army Air Corps

B-6
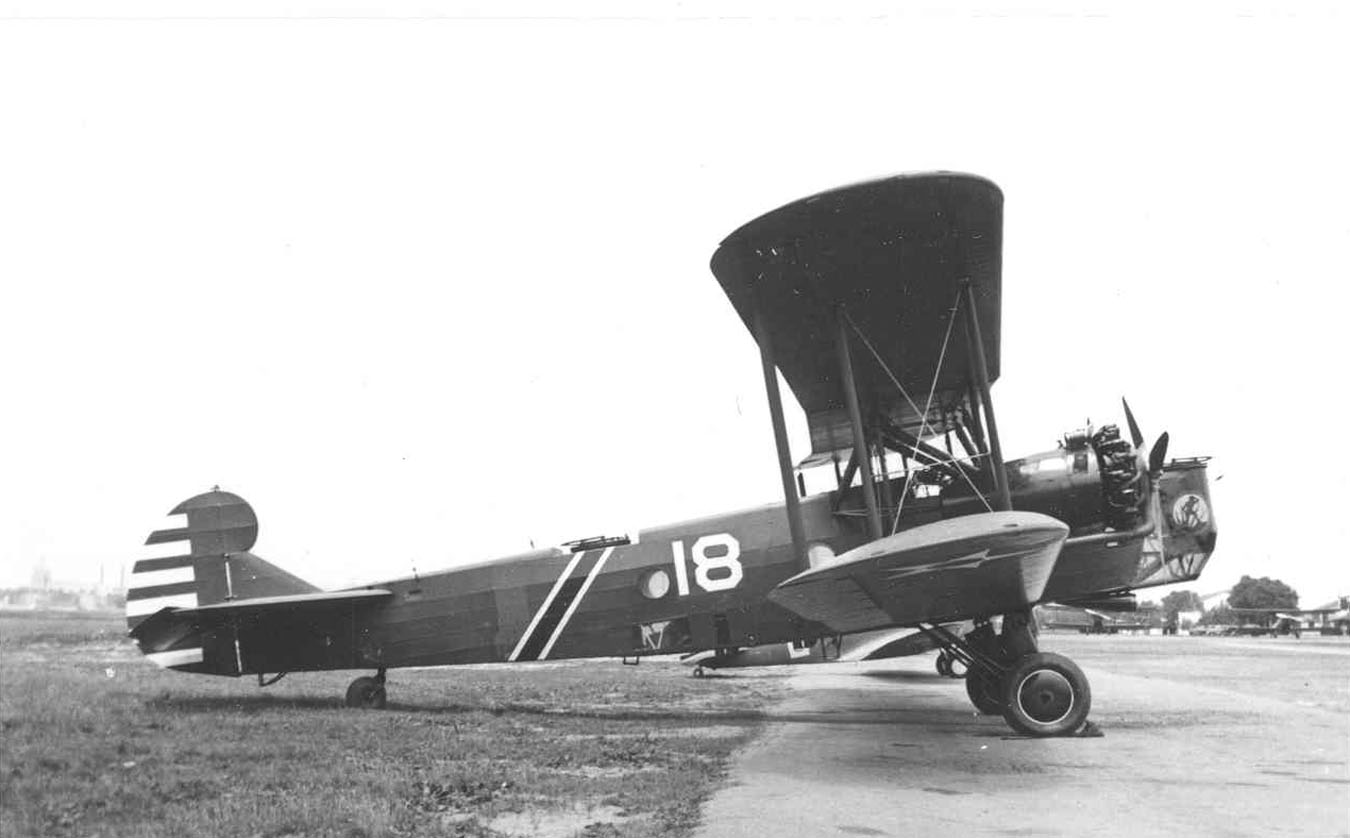
- Keystone B-6A of the 1st Bomb Squadron, 9th Bomb Group, Mitchel Field, N.Y.

General information
- Type: Light bomber
- Manufacturer: Keystone Aircraft
- Primary user: United States Army Air Corps
- Number built: 5 Y1B-6 + 39 B-6A

History
- Developed from: Keystone B-3

The Keystone B-6 was a biplane bomber developed by the Keystone Aircraft company for the United States Army Air Corps.

== Design and development ==
In 1931, the United States Army Air Corps received five working models (Y1B-6s) of the B-6 bomber. The Y1B- designation, as opposed to a YB- designation, indicates funding outside normal fiscal year procurement. Two of these were redesignations of LB-13s; three were re-engined B-3As. The Air Corps placed an order for 39 production models on 28 April 1931, with deliveries between August 1931 and January 1932.

At the same time, an order was placed for 25 B-4As, the same aircraft but mounting Pratt & Whitney engines instead of Wright Cyclones. Despite their lower sequence number, the B-4As would be delivered last. These were the last canvas-and-wood biplane bombers ordered by the Air Corps.

The performance of the B-6A varied little from the Martin NBS-1 ordered in 1921. Its successor, the monoplane bomber, had a hard time getting accepted. The Douglas Y1B-7 and Fokker XB-8 were originally designed as high-speed reconnaissance aircraft.

== Operational history ==
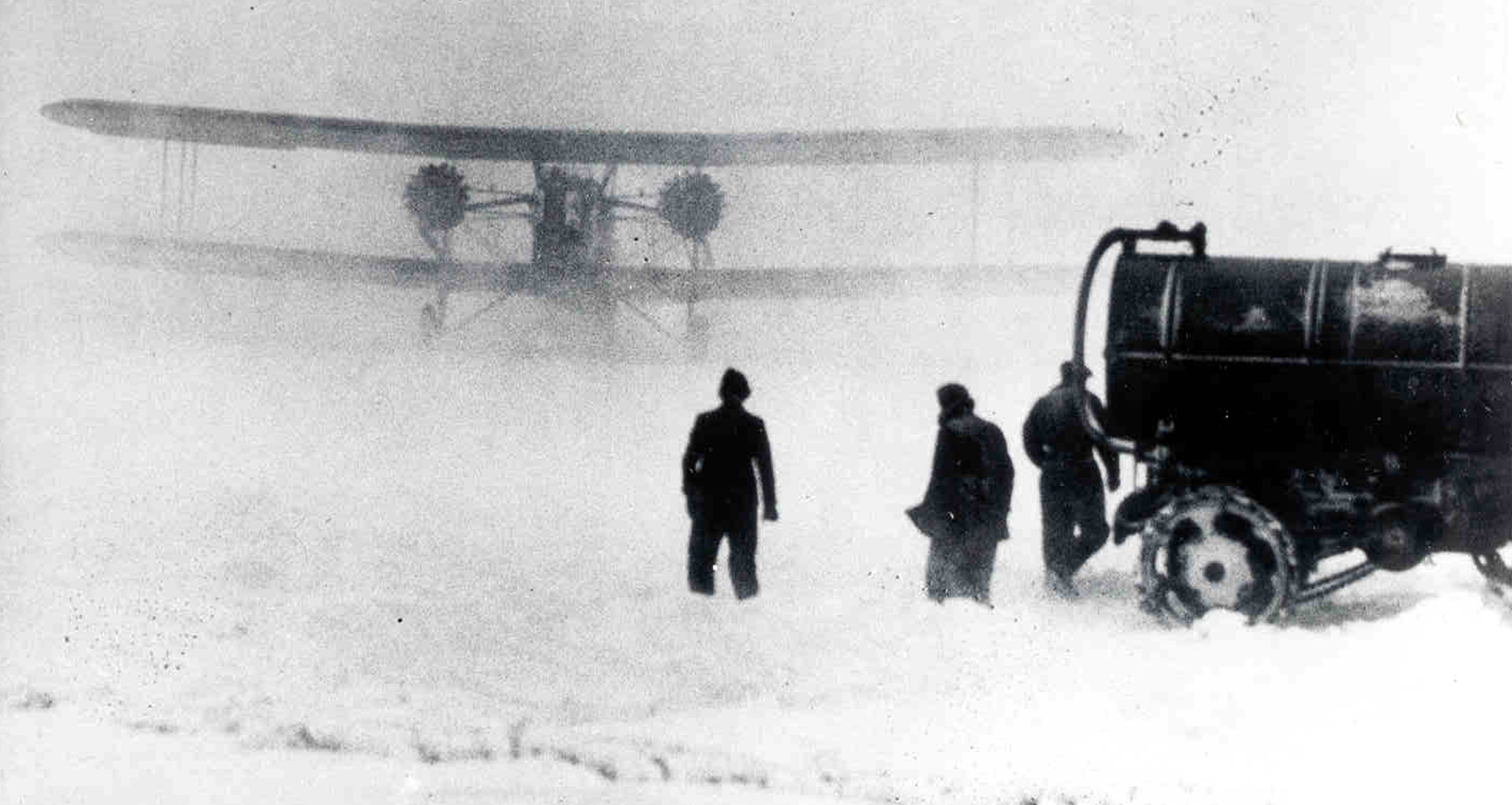
Keystone B-6 airmail plane in snowstorm, 1934

The B-6A together with B-5A were front line bombers of the United States for the period between 1930 and 1934. Afterwards, they remained in service primarily as observation aircraft until the early 1940s.

B-6 aircraft were used, along with many other Army Air Corps planes, as mail planes in what became the Air Mail scandal of 1934.

On December 27, 1935, six B-6 bombers of the 23rd Bomb Squadron based in Hawaii dropped bombs to divert lava flow from the volcano Mauna Loa away from the port of Hilo.

With the residents of Virginia′s Tangier Island and Maryland′s Smith Island facing starvation after a severe winter storm and with ships unable to reach the islands due to heavy ice in the Chesapeake Bay, an Army Air Corps 49th Bomb Squadron B-6A made a one-hour, 54-mile (87-km) flight from Langley Field, Virginia, to Tangier Island on 9 February 1936 to drop 1,000 pounds (450 kg) of supplies in 50-pound (23 kg) parcels to the islanders, flying at an altitude of not more than 10 feet (3.0 meters). On 10 February, the squadron's B-6As made four similar fights to Tangier Island and one to Smith Island. The flights followed a supply flight to Tangier Island by the Goodyear Blimp Enterprise on 2 February 1936. After the success of the B-6A flights, the 49th Bomb Squadron flew additional flights to drop supplies to the islands using 13 Martin B-10B bombers.

== Variants ==
LB-13
Seven aircraft ordered but delivered as the Y1B-4 and Y1B-6 with different engine installations.
Y1B-6
Two pre-production aircraft and three converted B-3As, as the LB-10 but with two 575 hp (429 kW) Wright R-1820-1 engines.
B-6A
Production version of the Y1B-6, 39 built.

== Operators ==
United States

- United States Army Air Corps

== Specifications (B-6A) ==
General characteristics

- Crew: 5
- Length: 48 ft 10 in (14.9 m)
- Wingspan: 74 ft 8 in (22.8 m)
- Height: 15 ft 9 in (4.8 m)
- Wing area: 1,145 sq ft (106.4 m^{2})
- Empty weight: 8,057 lb (3,665 kg)
- Gross weight: 13,350 lb (6,056 kg)
- Powerplant: 2 × Wright R-1820-1 radial engines, 575 hp (429 kW) each

Performance

- Maximum speed: 120 mph (190 km/h, 100 kn)
- Cruise speed: 103 mph (166 km/h, 89 kn)
- Range: 825 mi (1,330 km, 717 nmi)
- Service ceiling: 14,100 ft (6,400 m)
- Wing loading: 11.66 lb/sq ft (56.92 kg/m^{2})
- Power/mass: 0.0861 hp/lb (142 W/kg)

Armament

- Guns: 3 × .30 in (7.62 mm) Browning machine guns
- Bombs: 2,500 lb (1,100 kg); 4,000 lb (1,800 kg) on short runs

== See also ==
Related development

- Keystone B-3
- Keystone B-4
- Keystone B-5

Related lists

- List of bomber aircraft
- List of military aircraft of the United States
