= Keystone B-4 =

American bomber aircraft

B-4
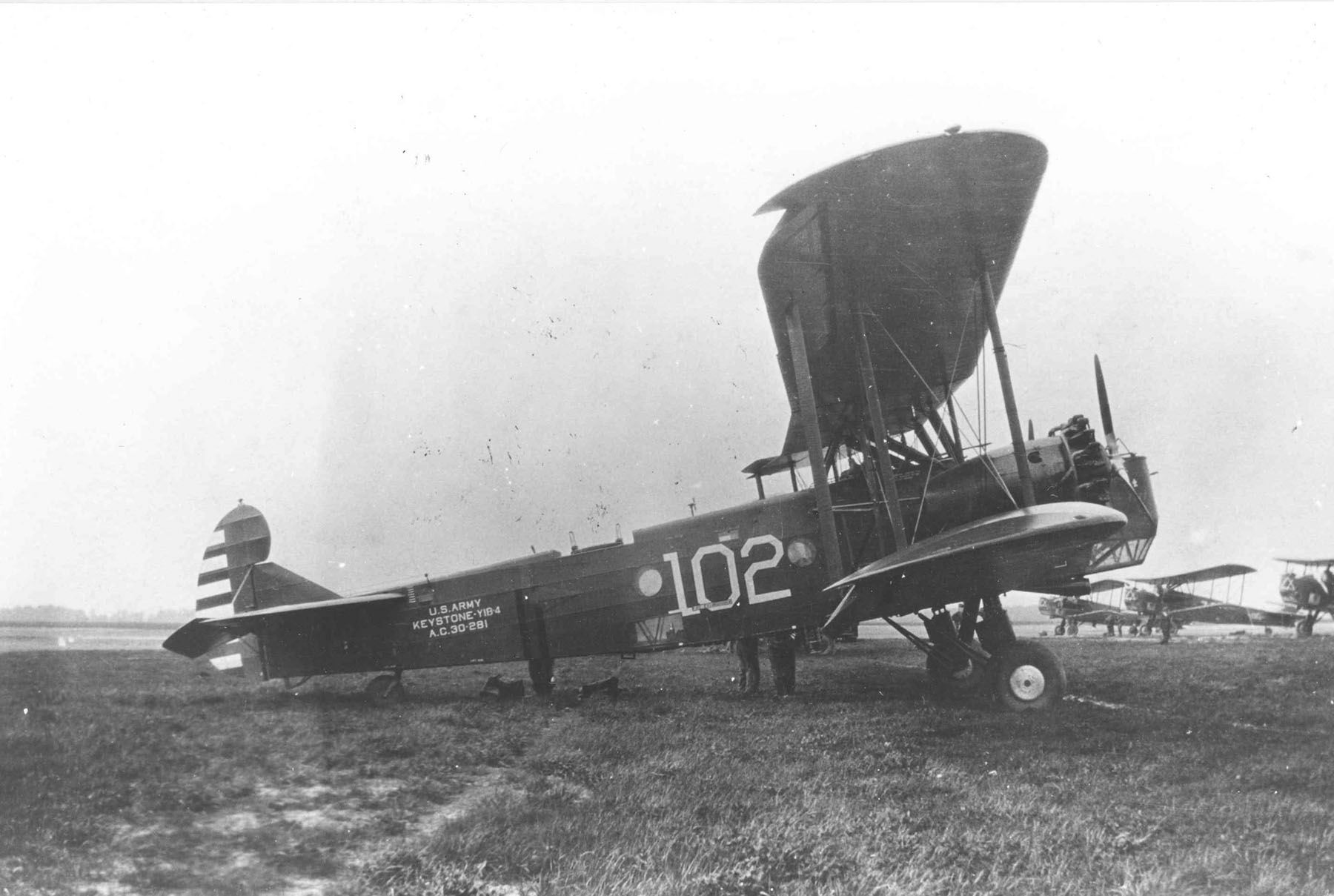
- Keystone Y1B-4 (S/N 30-281)

General information
- Type: Light bomber
- Manufacturer: Keystone Aircraft
- Status: Retired
- Primary user: United States Army Air Corps
- Number built: 5 Y1B-4; 25 B-4A

History
- Developed from: Keystone B-3

The Keystone B-4 was a biplane bomber, built by the Keystone Aircraft company for the United States Army Air Corps.

== Design and development ==
Originally ordered by the United States Army Air Corps as the LB-13 light bomber. When the LB- designation was dropped in 1930, the first five planes were redesignated Y1B-4. (The Y1B- designation indicates that funds for the design did not come from the normal annual funds.)

The first B-3A (S/N 30-281) was converted to Y1B-4 configuration with the addition of R-1860-7 radial engines and low pressure tires. Because of more powerful engines, the performance of the Y1B-4 was a slight improvement on the B-3, but the only difference between the two planes was their engines. On April 28, 1931, the army ordered 25 improved Y1B-4s as the Keystone B-4A. This production version was part of the last biplane bomber order made by the Army Air Corps (along with 39 B-6As, identical in all respects except their make of engine), and the B-4As, delivered between January and April 1932, were the last biplane bombers delivered to the Air Corps.

== Operational history ==
The B-4 was the last of the Keystone biplane bombers ordered by the U.S. Army in late 1931. These aircraft were used primarily as observation and reconnaissance aircraft as early as 1934 when the Martin B-10B went into operational service. Some remained in service into the early 1940s.

== Variants ==
LB-13
Seven aircraft ordered but delivered as the Y1B-4 and Y1B-6 with different engine installations.
Y1B-4
Five pre-production aircraft, as the LB-10 but with two 575 hp (429 kW) Pratt & Whitney R-1860-7 engines.
B-4A
Production version of the Y1B-4, 25 built.

== Operators ==
United States

- United States Army Air Corps

== Specifications (B-4A) ==
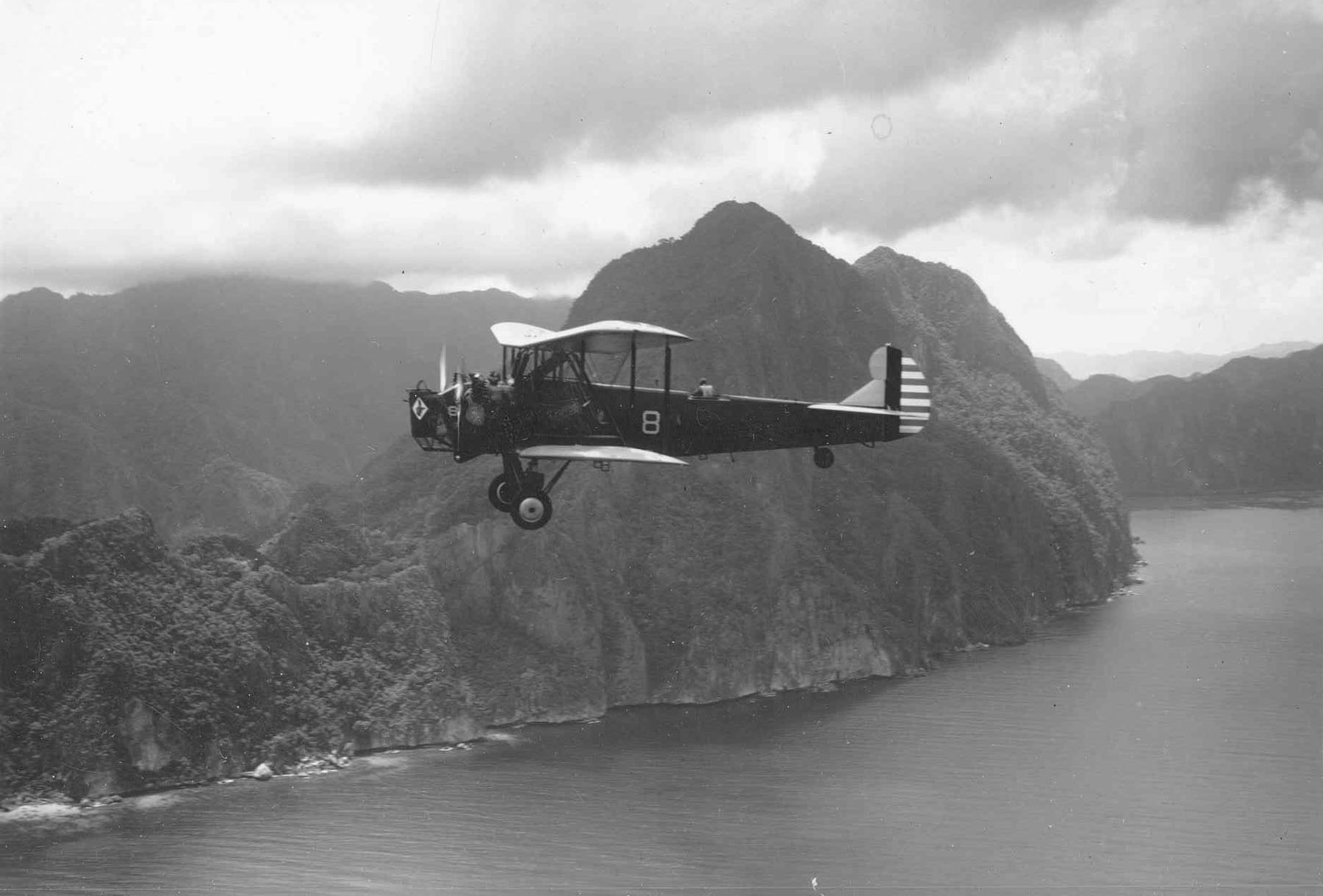
Keystone B-4A in flight in the Philippines

General characteristics

- Crew: 5
- Length: 48 ft 10 in (14.9 m)
- Wingspan: 74 ft 8 in (22.8 m)
- Height: 15 ft 9 in (4.8 m)
- Wing area: 1,145 sq ft (106.4 m^{2})
- Empty weight: 7,951 lb (3,607 kg)
- Gross weight: 12,952 lb (5,875 kg)
- Powerplant: 2 × Pratt & Whitney R-1860-7 radial engines, 575 hp (429 kW) each

Performance

- Maximum speed: 130 mph (210 km/h, 110 kn)
- Cruise speed: 103 mph (167 km/h, 90 kn)
- Range: 850 mi (1,400 km, 760 nmi)
- Service ceiling: 14,000 ft (4,300 m)
- Rate of climb: 580 ft/min (30 m/s)
- Wing loading: 11.31 lb/sq ft (55.22 kg/m^{2})
- Power/mass: 0.0888 hp/lb (146 W/kg)

Armament

- Guns: 3 × .30 in (7.62 mm) Browning machine guns
- Bombs: 2,500 lb (1,100 kg); 4,000 lb (1,800 kg) on short runs

== See also ==
Related development

- Keystone B-3
- Keystone B-5
- Keystone B-6

Related lists

- List of bomber aircraft
- List of military aircraft of the United States
