= Keystone B-5 =

B-5
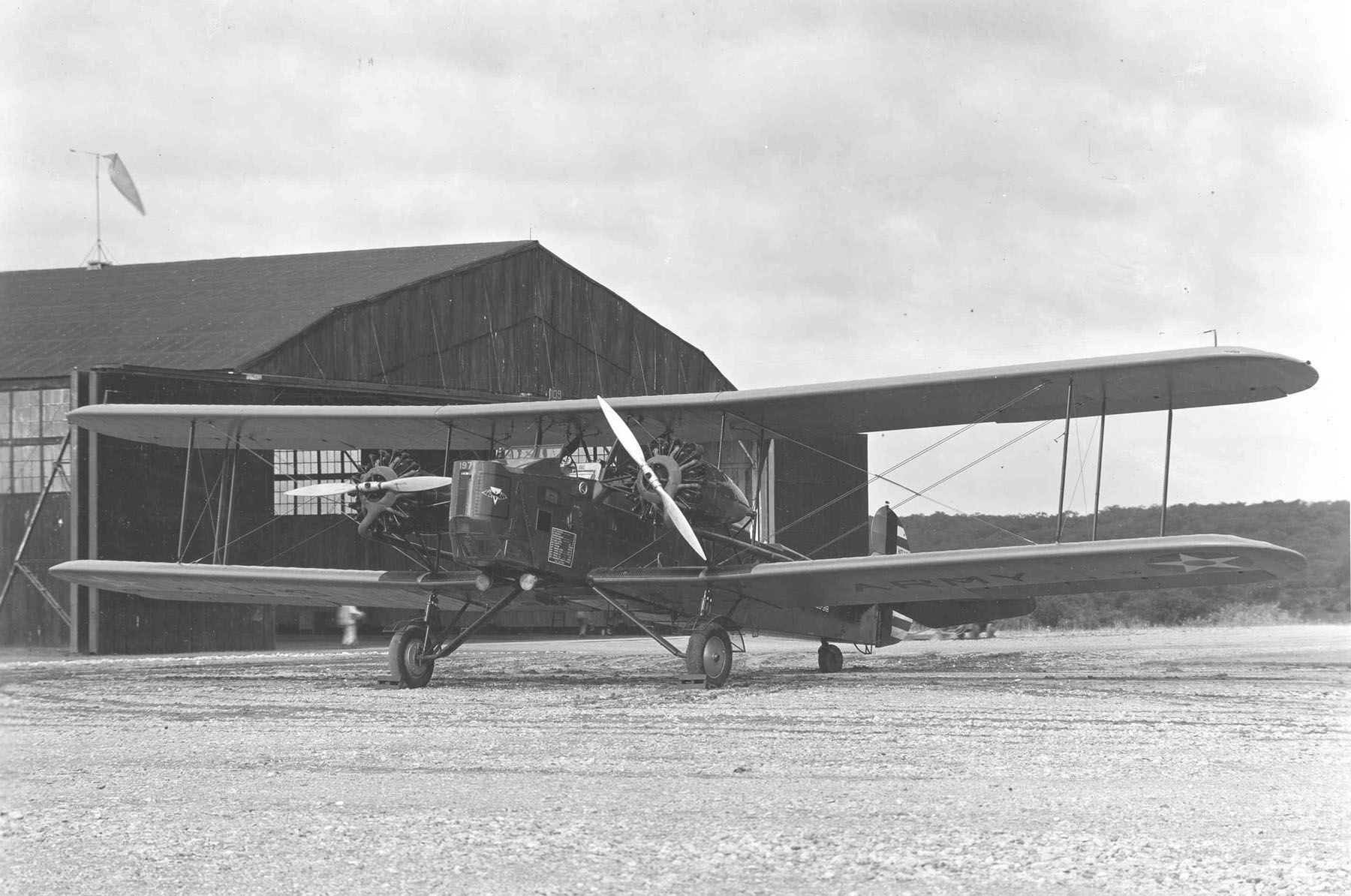
- Keystone B-5A

General information
- Type: Light bomber
- Manufacturer: Keystone Aircraft
- Primary user: United States Army Air Corps
- Number built: 3 Y1B-5; 27 B-5A

History
- Developed from: Keystone B-3

The Keystone B-5 is a light bomber made by the Keystone Aircraft company for the United States Army Air Corps in the early 1930s. The B-5A was a Keystone B-3A with Wright Cyclone rather than Pratt & Whitney engines.

== Design and development ==
Three B-3A (LB-10A) were reengined with Wright R-1750-3 radial engines and were redesignated Y1B-5. The Army Air Corps changed the design of the last 27 LB-10As on order, replacing the Pratt & Whitney R-1690 radial engines with the Wright R-1750-3. The Pratt & Whitney-powered aircraft were designated B-3A, and the Wright-powered aircraft became B-5A. They provided the backbone of the U.S. bomber force from then to 1934.

== Operational history ==
B-5A were first line bombers of the United States for the period between 1930 and 1934. Afterwards, they remained in service primarily as observation aircraft until the early 1940s.

== Variants ==
LB-14
Designed as LB-10 with 575 hp (429 kW) Pratt & Whitney GR-1860 engines; three ordered, but redesigned with 525 hp (392 kW) Wright R-1750-3 engines and delivered as the Y1B-5.
Y1B-5
Three pre-production aircraft redesignated from LB-14 before delivery.
B-5A
Wright R-1750-3 version originally ordered as B-3A, 27 built

== Operators ==
United States

- United States Army Air Corps

== Specifications (B-5A) ==
General characteristics

- Crew: 5
- Length: 48 ft 10 in (14.9 m)
- Wingspan: 74 ft 8 in (22.8 m)
- Height: 15 ft 9 in (4.8 m)
- Wing area: 1,145 sq ft (106.4 m^{2})
- Empty weight: 7,705 lb (3,945 kg)
- Gross weight: 12,952 lb (5,875 kg)
- Powerplant: 2 × Wright R-1750-3 radial engines, 525 hp (392 kW) each

Performance

- Maximum speed: 111 mph (179 km/h, 97 kn)
- Cruise speed: 98 mph (160 km/h, 86 kn)
- Range: 815 mi (1,310 km, 707 nmi)
- Service ceiling: 14,000 ft (4,270 m)
- Wing loading: 273.3 lb/sq ft (52.22 kg/m^{2})
- Power/mass: 0.0810 hp/lb (133 W/kg)

Armament

- Guns: 3 × .30 in (7.62 mm) Browning machine guns
- Bombs: 2,500 lb (1,100 kg); 4,000 lb (1,800 kg) on short runs

== See also ==
Related development

- Keystone B-3
- Keystone B-4
- Keystone B-6

Related lists

- List of bomber aircraft
- List of military aircraft of the United States
