= 5th Operations Group =

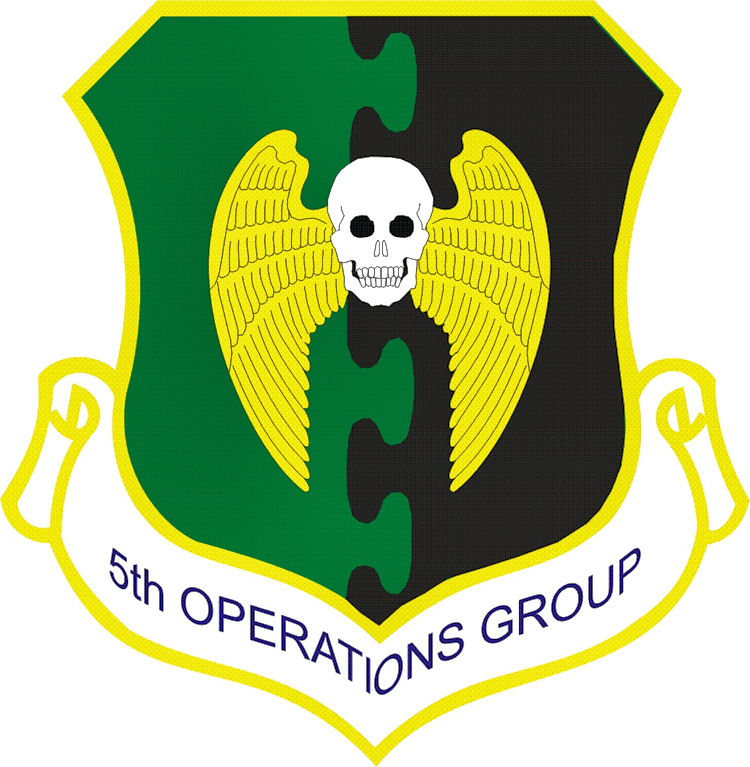
- Emblem of the 5th Operations Group (Note: Approved 21 June 1924, current version, 5 February 2019. Description: Party per pale nebuly vert and sable a death's head argent, winged or. Crest (no longer current): On a wreath of the colors (argent and vert) a bull's head caboshed azure and armed or.)
- Active: 1919–1952; 1991–present
- Country: United States
- Branch: United States Air Force
- Role: strategic bombardment
- Part of: Air Force Global Strike Command
- Motto: Kiai O Ka Lewa (Hawaiian for 'Guardians of the Upper Realm')
- Engagements: Southwest Pacific Theater
- Decorations: Distinguished Unit Citation; Navy Presidential Unit Citation; Air Force Outstanding Unit Award with Combat "V" Device; Air Force Outstanding Unit Award; Philippine Republic Presidential Unit Citation

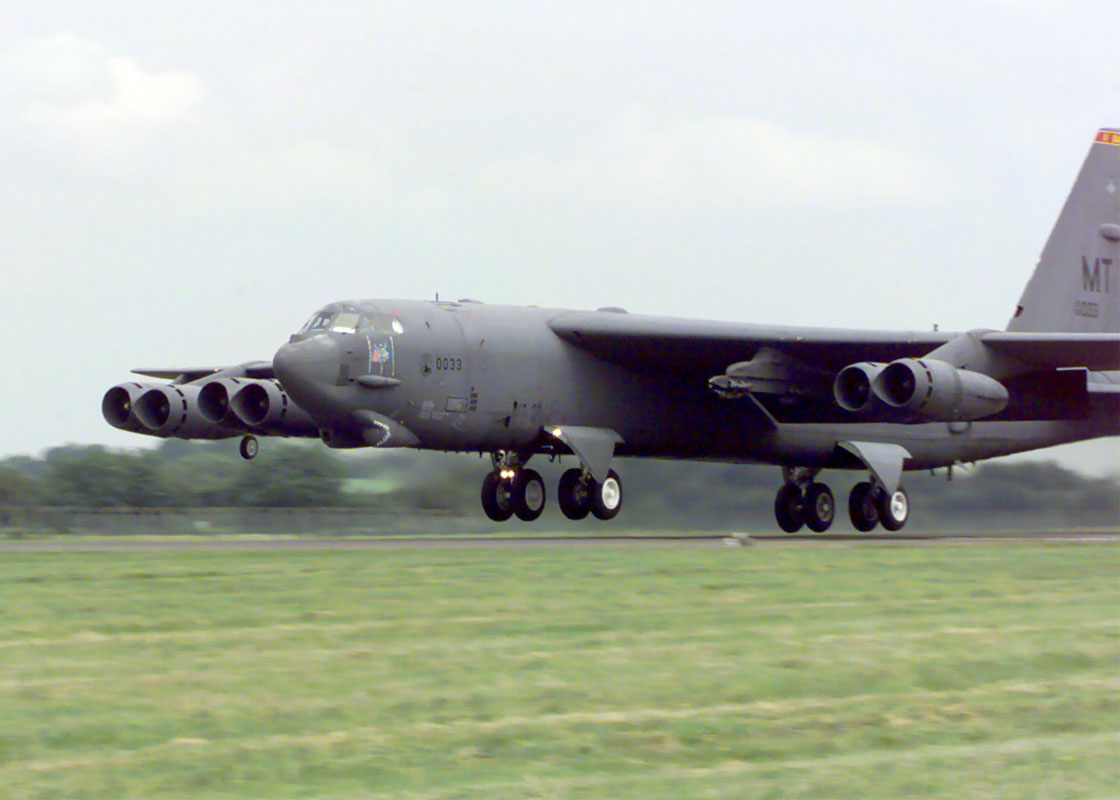
Boeing B-52H-145-BW Stratofortress 60-0033, from the 5th Operations Group takes-off homeward bound after a deployment to RAF Fairford, England.

The 5th Operations Group (5 OG) is an operational component of the United States Air Force 5th Bomb Wing, stationed at Minot Air Force Base, North Dakota. Its mission is to manage and operate B-52H Stratofortress bombers serve as part of the Air Force's conventional and strategic combat force.

The group is one of the oldest units in the United States Air Force, being a successor organization of the 5th Group (Composite), one of the 15 original combat air groups formed by the Army before World War II.

== Units ==
The 5 OG commands the following squadrons (Tail Code: MT):

- 23d Bomb Squadron
- 69th Bomb Squadron
- 5th Operations Support Squadron

== Heraldry ==
The group's emblem, approved in 1924, features a winged death's head as an uncompromising symbol of its combat mission.

== History ==
For additional lineage and history, see 5th Bomb Wing

The 5th Operations Group's history dates back more than eight decades to the infancy of military aviation. It originally activated as the 2nd Group (Observation) 15 August 1919, at Luke Field in the Territory of Hawaii. In 1921, the group was redesignated the 5th Group (Observation). A year later, it became the 5th Group (Pursuit and Bombardment) with its crews flying DeHaviland DH-4 aircraft.

Activities included training, participating in Army-Navy maneuvers, staging aerial reviews and sowing seeds from the air for the Territorial Forestry Division. In 1935, the group helped save the city of Hilo, Hawaii, during the eruption of the Mauna Loa volcano. Ten Keystone B-3 and B-4 bombers from the group's 23d and 72d Bombardment Squadrons dropped 20, 600-pound bombs around the volcano to divert molten lava away from the town. Redesignated 5th Bombardment Group in March 1938, 5th Bombardment Group (Medium) in December 1939, and 5th Bombardment Group (Heavy) in November 1940. Equipped with Boeing B-17 Flying Fortresses and Douglas B-18 Bolos by December 1941.

Army Air Force Aircraft at Luke Field
Dates	Unit	Aircraft
1918-1920	6th Aero Squadron	N-9, R-6, HS2L
1920-1926	6th Fighter Squadron	DH-4, HS2L, JN-6, MB-3, Fokker D-VII
1922-1939	23d Bomb Squadron	NBS-1, JN-6, DH-4
1923-1939	72d Bomb Squadron	DH-4, NBS-1, LB-5
1929-1937	4th Observation Squadron	O-19, OA-1, B-12, P-12
1930-1936	431st Bomb Squadron	O-19

=== World War II ===
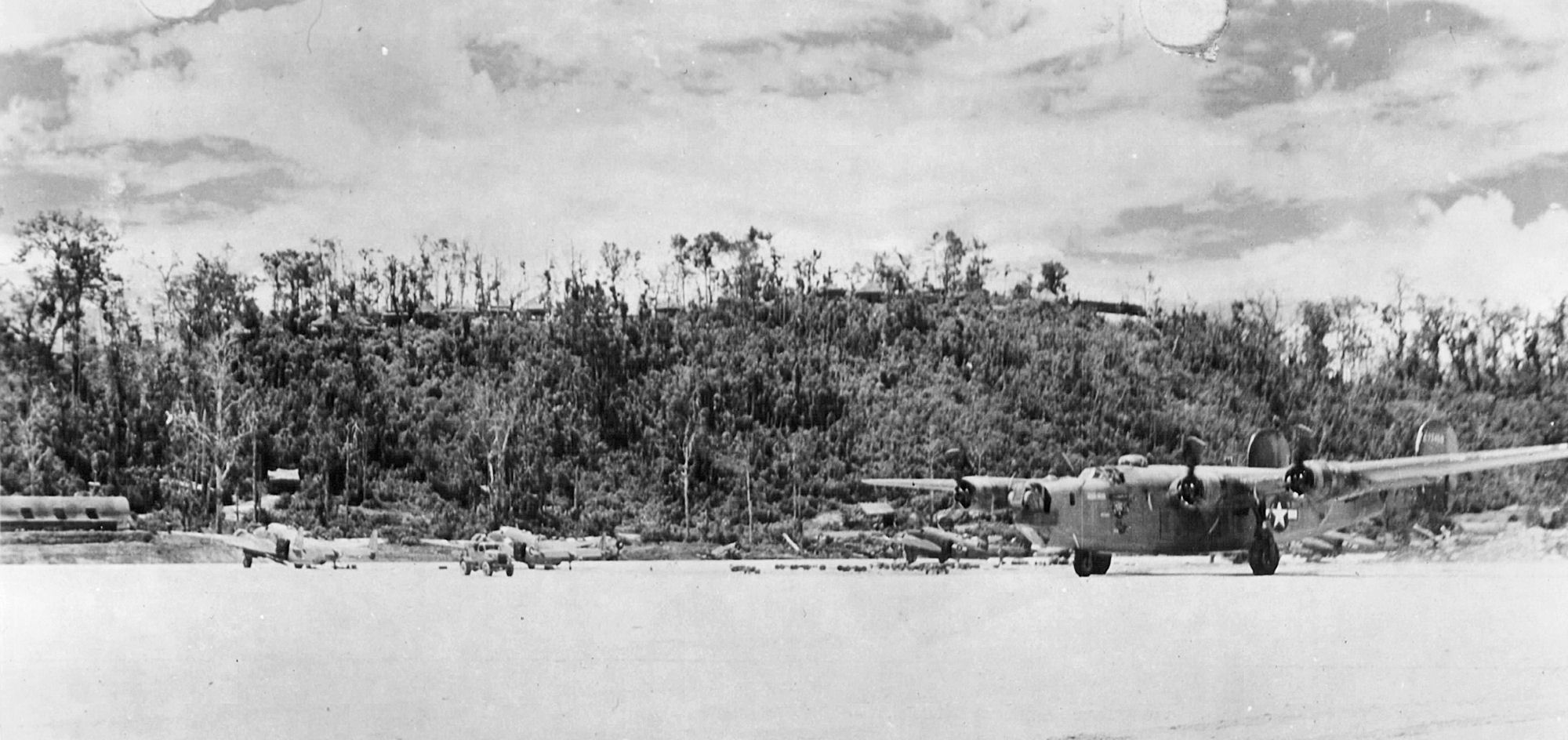
A 5th Bomb Group B-24 Liberator preparing to take off from Munda Airfield, New Georgia, Solomon Islands on 27 March 1944.

The 5th Bombardment Group suffered devastating casualties and equipment damage during the Japanese surprise attack on Pearl Harbor, Hickam Field and other targets on the island of Oahu on 7 December 1941. However, the group's aircrews went on to become the first U.S. military forces to take to the air following the attack.

Assigned to Seventh Air Force in February 1942. Engaged primarily in search and patrol missions off Hawaii from December 1941 to November 1942. In Hawaii, the B-17E-equipped 5th and 11th Bombardment Groups were used in the Battle of Midway to attack Japanese surface fleets. High-altitude bombing attacks against moving ships capable of evasive action proved to be completely unsuccessful at Midway. Although several attacks were made by the B-17s, none of their bombs actually hit a single Japanese ship. An attack against naval vessels at sea was found to be a job best done by low-altitude North American B-25 Mitchell/Martin B-26 Marauder medium bombers or by Douglas A-24 Banshee dive bombers.

Left Hawaii in November 1942 and, operating primarily from Pekoa Airfield, Espírito Santo in the New Hebrides Islands with a mix of B-17 and B-24 aircraft, served in combat with Thirteenth Air Force during the Allied drive from the Solomons to the Philippines. Flew long patrol and photographic missions over the Solomon Islands and the Coral Sea, attacked Japanese shipping off Guadalcanal, and raided airfields in the northern Solomons until August 1943. Then struck enemy bases and installations on Bougainville, New Britain, and New Ireland.

The group moved between various bases in the Southwest Pacific and by mid-1943, most B-17s were withdrawn in favor of the longer-ranged Consolidated B-24 Liberator. The B-24 was better suited for operations in the Pacific, having a higher speed and a larger bomb load at medium altitudes. In addition, the losses in Europe were reaching such magnitudes that the entire B-17 production was urgently needed for replacements and training in that theatre.

The 5th raided the heavily defended Japanese base on Woleai during April and May 1944 and received a Distinguished Unit Citation for the action. Helped to neutralize enemy bases on Yap and in the Truk and Palau Islands, June–August 1944, preparatory to the invasion of Peleliu and Leyte. Flew missions to the Netherlands Indies, receiving a DUC for an attack, conducted through heavy flak and fighter defenses, on oil installations at Balikpapan, Borneo, on 30 September 1944. Completed a variety of missions from October 1944 until the end of the war, these operations including raids on enemy bases and installations on Luzon, Ceram, Halmahera, and Formosa; support for ground forces in the Philippines and Borneo; and patrols off the China coast. Moved to the Philippines in 1945 till the end of the war.

During the nearly four years of war, the group participated in 10 major campaigns, flew more than 1,000 combat missions and earned two Distinguished Unit Citations and the Philippine Presidential Unit Citation. During the time, its members accumulated more than 13,300 medals and decorations.

=== Post/Cold War ===
Remained in the theater as part of Far East Air Forces after the war, but all personnel evidently had been withdrawn by early in 1946. Redesignated 5th Bombardment Group (Very Heavy) in April 1946, and 5th Reconnaissance Group in February 1947.

Between 1947 and 1958, the group underwent several name and assignment changes while continually upgrading its aircraft. Performed long-range strategic reconnaissance, July 1949 – October 1955, with some limited reconnaissance to September 1958. Operational squadrons were 23d, 31st and 72d Strategic Reconnaissance flying Boeing RB-17G/F-2/F-9/F-13 aircraft (1947–49) and beginning in 1948, Boeing RB-29 aircraft until 1951. Not operational from 10 February 1951 until the group was inactivated on 16 June 1952 when the 5th Reconnaissance Wing implemented the Tri-Deputate organization plan and assigned all flying elements directly to the wing.

=== Modern era ===
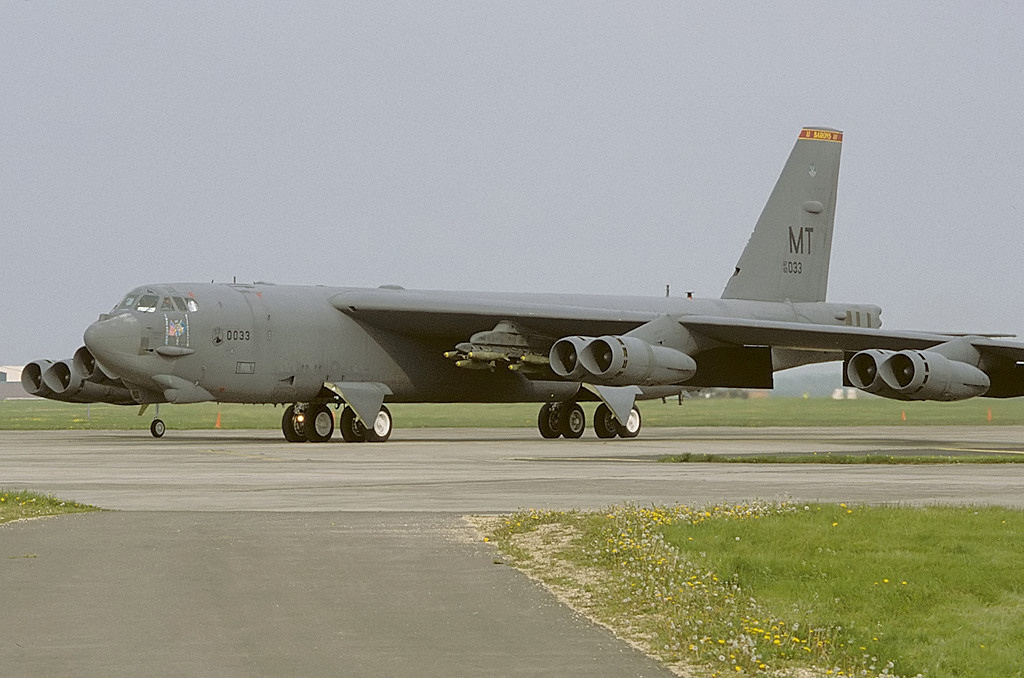
A 5th BW B-52H Stratofortress, pictured at RAF Fairford loaded with 750 lb bombs during Operation 'Nole Anvil', the NATO bombing of Yugoslavia

Reactivated in September 1991 when the 5th Bombardment Group implemented the Objective Wing organization, assigning all flying units to the 5th Operations Group.

Budgetary cuts in 1996 led to a need for further force reductions which reduced the 5th's B-52H fleet. The 72d BS was inactivated late in the year and their 12 aircraft were retired.

In the weeks following the terrorist attacks against the United States on 11 September 2001, the 5th BW deployed in support of Operation Enduring Freedom. Flying from a forward operating location, bomber crews attacked strategic targets in Afghanistan to topple the Taliban regime.

In 2003, the wing deployed approximately 550 people and 14 B-52s to the U.S. European Command region in support of Operation Iraqi Freedom. During the war, the wing's B-52s flew more than 120 combat missions and logged more than 1,600 combat flying hours. The bombers dropped more than 3 million pounds of weaponry, including conventional air-launched cruise missiles, joint direct attack munitions, gravity weapons, laser-guided bombs and leaflet dispensers. For the first time in combat history, a 5th BW crew employed a Litening II targeting pod to strike targets at an Iraqi airfield 11 April 2003.

In March 2004, the wing sent six B-52s and over 300 support personnel to Andersen AFB, Guam. The aircraft and crews supported U.S. Pacific Command operations to provide a stabilizing military force in the region.

In April 2005, the wing forward deployed aircraft and personnel to the 40th Air Expeditionary Wing in support of U.S. Central Command combat operations in Afghanistan. Flying a mix of close air support and strike missions, 5th BW crews ensured success of ground combat units in meeting their objectives.

Today, the 5th's B-52Hs are a major component of the USAF's strategic bombing force, alongside the Rockwell B-1B Lancer and the Northrop B-2A Spirit. The USAF is currently considering converting some of its B-52Hs to EB-52Hs to act as a stand-off electronic warfare platform. During Operation Allied Force (the bombing of Serbia undertaken in an attempt to halt the ethnic cleansing of Kosovo), the USAF found that additional jamming aircraft were needed to supplement the current fleet of Grumman EA-6A/B Prowler. With modern technology and advanced weapons like the JDAM and JASSM, the 5th's B-52 are expected to remain operational until the year 2040.

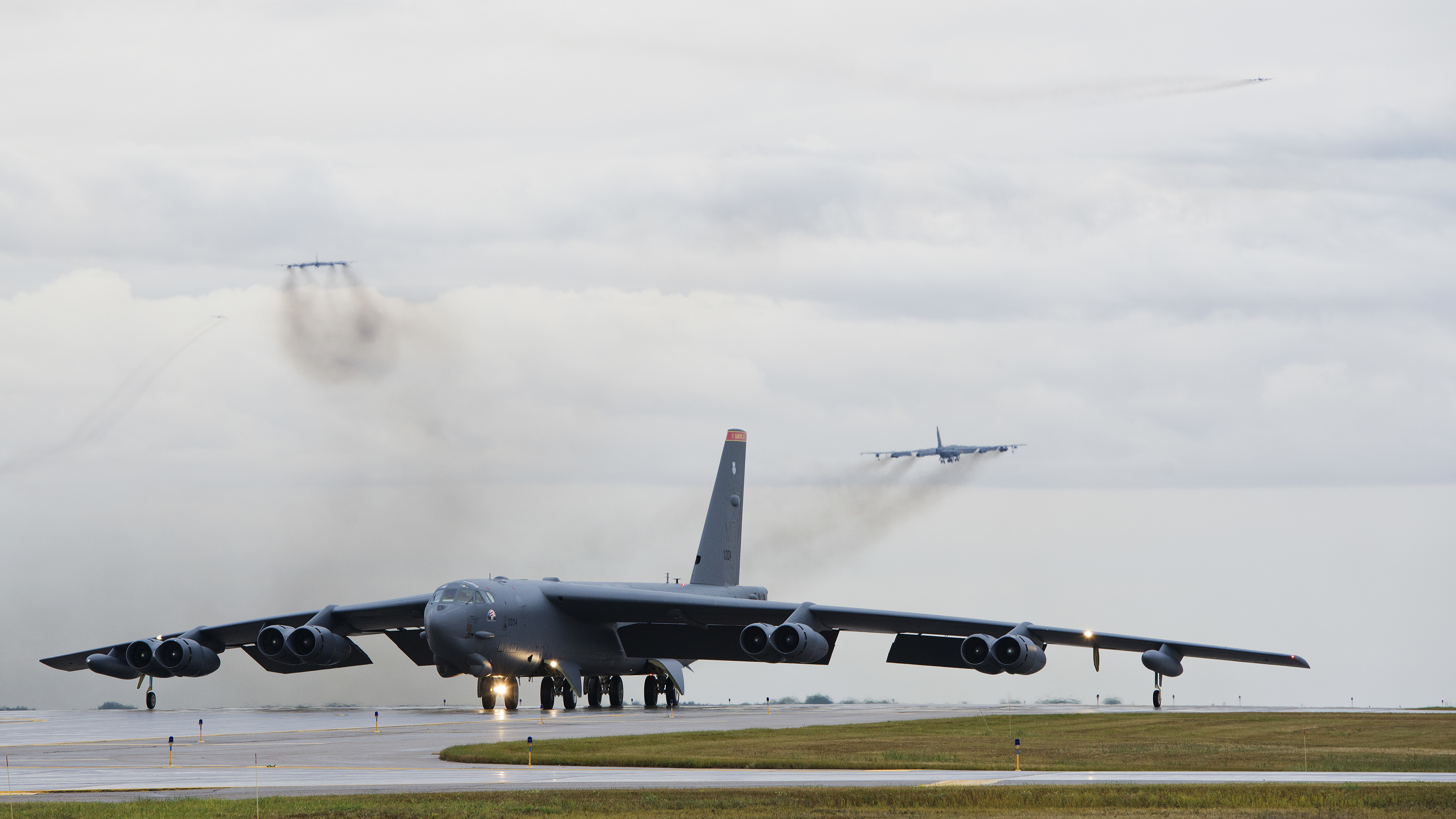
B-52H's during Exercise Prairie Vigilance 16-1 at Minot Air Force Base, N.D.

In 2007 the Wing lost its commanding officer after Colonel Bruce Emig was removed in connection with the 2007 United States Air Force nuclear weapons incident, when negligent handling of nuclear weapons breached safety and security procedures. Emig was replaced by Joel S. Westa. Following that incident, the wing failed a nuclear surety inspection conducted by the Defense Threat Reduction Agency in May 2008. The wing, however, kept its certification to perform missions and training with nuclear weapons.

On 30 October 2009 Westa was relieved as commander of the 5th Bomb Wing by Major General Floyd L. Carpenter, commander of 8th Air Force. Carpenter stated that Westa was relieved due to his "inability to foster a culture of excellence, a lack of focus on the strategic mission ... and substandard performance during several nuclear surety inspections, including the newly activated 69th Bomb Squadron." Colonel Douglas Cox was appointed new wing commander.

16 September 2016 saw one of the 5th OG's largest annual readiness exercise dubbed "Exercise Prairie Vigilance" take place. The annual exercise is designed to test the wing's combat readiness and ability to conduct conventional and nuclear-capable bomber operations. With no prior notice for aircrew, 12 B-52H bombers took off in rapid succession.

=== Lineage ===
- Authorized (established) as 2d Group (Observation), and organized, on 15 August 1919

Redesignated: 5th Group (Observation) on 14 March 1921
Redesignated: 5th Group (Pursuit and Bombardment), c. 9 June 1922
Redesignated: 5th Group (Composite) on 11 July 1922
Redesignated: 5th Composite Group on unknown date
Redesignated: 5th Bombardment Group on 9 March 1938
Redesignated: 5th Bombardment Group (Medium) on 6 December 1939
Redesignated: 5th Bombardment Group (Heavy) on 20 November 1940
Redesignated: 5th Bombardment Group, Heavy on 12 September 1944
Redesignated: 5th Bombardment Group, Very Heavy on 30 April 1946
Redesignated: 5th Reconnaissance Group, Very Long Range, Photographic on 11 March 1947
Redesignated: 5th Strategic Reconnaissance Group on 16 July 1949
Redesignated: 5th Strategic Reconnaissance Group, Heavy on 14 November 1950
Inactivated on 16 June 1952

- Redesignated 5th Operations Group on 29 August 1991

Activated on 1 September 1991.

=== Assignments ===
- Hawaiian Department, 15 August 1919
- 18th Composite Wing (later, 18th Wing; 18th Bombardment Wing), 1 May 1931
- VII Bomber Command, 29 January 1942
- Thirteenth Air Force, 4 January 1943
- XIII Bomber Command, 13 January 1943
- Far East Air Forces (later, Pacific Air Command, U.S. Army), 15 December 1945
- Thirteenth Air Force, 15 May 1946
- 313th Bombardment Wing, 10 June 1946
- Thirteenth Air Force, 5 February 1947
- 313th Bombardment Wing, 15 March 1947

Attached to Thirteenth Air Force, 7 August-31 December 1947

- Thirteenth Air Force, 1 January 1948
- Far East Air Forces, 1 December 1948

Attached to 18th Fighter Wing, 1 December 1948 – 16 May 1949

- Thirteenth Air Force, 16 May 1949
- 311th Air Division, 26 May 1949
- 5th Strategic Reconnaissance Wing, 16 July 1949 – 16 June 1952

Attached to 9th Strategic Reconnaissance Wing, 9 November 1949 – 10 February 1951

- 5th Wing (later, 5th Bomb) Wing, 1 September 1991–present

=== Components ===
United States Army Air Service/Corps/Air Forces

- 4th Aero (later, 4th Squadron; 4th Observation; 4th Reconnaissance; 394th Bombardment Squadron): 15 December 1919 – 31 January 1922 (detached 15 December 1919 – 23 January 1920); 11 January 1927 – 11 October 1938, attached 12 October 1938 – 24 February 1942, assigned 25 February 1942 – 29 April 1946
- 6th Aero (later, 6th Squadron; 6th Pursuit) Squadron: 15 September 1919 – 11 January 1927
- 19th Pursuit Squadron: 15 January 1924 – 11 January 1927
- 23d Squadron (later, 23d Bombardment; 23d Reconnaissance; 23d Strategic Reconnaissance; 23d Bombardment; 23d Bomb) Squadron: 29 March 1922 – 7 May 1929, attached 8 May 1929 – 11 October 1938, assigned 12 October 1938 – 10 March 1947 (not operational, 1946-10 March 1947); assigned 20 October 1947 – 16 June 1952 (detached August 1948-16 March 1949 and 10 February 1951 – 16 June 1952); 1 September 1991–present
- 26th Attack (later, 26th Bombardment) Squadron: 1 September 1930 – 31 January 1940 (detached entire period)
- 31st Bombardment (later, 31st Strategic Reconnaissance; 31st Bombardment) Squadron: 1 February 1938 – 10 March 1947; 1 December 1949 – 16 June 1952 (detached December 1949-16 November 1950 and 10 February 1951 – 16 June 1952)
- 50th Observation (later, 50th Reconnaissance; 5th Reconnaissance) Squadron: 1 November 1930 – 11 October 1938, attached 12 October 1938 – 31 January 1940; assigned 3 February-20 October 1947
- 72d Bombardment (later, 72d Strategic Reconnaissance; 72d Bombardment; 72d Bomb) Squadron: 1 May 1923 – 7 May 1929, attached 8 May 1929 – 11 October 1938, assigned 12 October 1938 – 10 March 1947; assigned 28 June 1949 – 16 June 1952 (detached 10 February 1951 – 16 June 1952); assigned 1 December 1994 – 1 July 1996

United States Air Force

- 38th Reconnaissance Squadron: 20 April 1947 – 26 May 1949
- 58th Bombardment Squadron: attached 1941-11 July 1942
- 69th Bomb Squadron, 3 September 2009–present
- 338th Reconnaissance Squadron: 15 March 1947 – 26 May 1949
- 906th Air Refueling Squadron: 1 September 1991 – 1 June 1992.

=== Stations ===
- Luke Field, Hawaii (Territory), 15 August 1919
- Hickam Field, Hawaii (Territory), 1 January 1939
- Pekoa Airfield, Espiritu Santo, New Hebrides, 1 December 1942
- Henderson Field, Guadalcanal, Solomon Islands, 19 August 1943
- Munda Airfield, New Georgia, Solomon Islands, 4 February 1944
- Momote Airfield, Los Negros, Admiralty Islands, 7 April 1944
- Wakde Airfield, Wakde, Netherlands East Indies, 17 August 1944
- Kornasoren (Yebrurro) Airfield Noemfoor, Schouten Islands, 22 September 1944
- Wama Airfield, Morotai, Molucca Islands, 16 October 1944
- Guiuan Airfield, Samar, Philippine Islands, 5 March 1945
- Clark Field, Luzon, Philippine Islands, December 1945-6 May 1949
- Mountain Home AFB, Idaho, 26 May 1949
- Fairfield-Suisun (later, Travis) AFB, California, 9 November 1949 – 16 June 1952
- Minot AFB, North Dakota, 1 September 1991–present

=== Aircraft ===
- DH-4, 1919–1929
- HS-2L (flying boat), 1919–1926
- N-9, 1919–1920
- R-6, 1919–1920
- Fokker D-VII, 1920–1926
- JN-6, 1920–1929
- MB-3, 1920–1926
- NBS-1, 1922–1929
- LB-5, 1923–1929
- SE-5, 1924–1926
- PW-9, 1927
- B-4, 1929–1937
- B-5, 1929–1937
- LB-6, 1929–1934
- OA-1, 1929–1937
- O-19, 1929–1937
- Boeing P-12, c. 1930–1937
- Martin B-12, c. 1934–1939
- A-3 Falcon, 1936–1938
- B-18 Bolo, 1938–1942
- B-17 Flying Fortress, 1941–1943; 1947–1949
- B-24 Liberator, 1943–1945
- LB-30 Liberator, 1942
- C-46 Commando, 1947–1948
- F-2 Expeditor, 1947–1949
- F-9 Flying Fortress, 1947
- F-13 Superfortress, 1947–1948
- RB-29 Superfortress, 1948–1951
- RB-36 Peacemaker, 1951
- B-52H Stratofortress, 1991–present
- KC-135, 1991–1992
- T-38 Talon, 1994–1995.
