= Global Thunder =

U.S. military exercise

Global Thunder is an annual U.S. nuclear strategic command and control exercise meant to create realistic training activities against simulated opposition, with the goal to improve and maintain nuclear readiness and strategic deterrent capabilities. This training involves increased bomber flights, missileer training, and SSBN readiness, verifying reliability and resilience of the nuclear triad.

== History ==
Global Thunder has been held annually since the first documented GT training exercise in 2014, GT 15. The exercises commonly start around the end of October to the beginning of November and last for approximately 10 days.

=== Global Thunder 15 ===
GT 15 lasted for an 11-day period from October 17–28, 2014.

==== Participants ====
- Air Force Global Strike Command
- 8th Airforce
- 2nd Bomb Wing
- 307th Bomb Wing

=== Global Thunder 16 ===
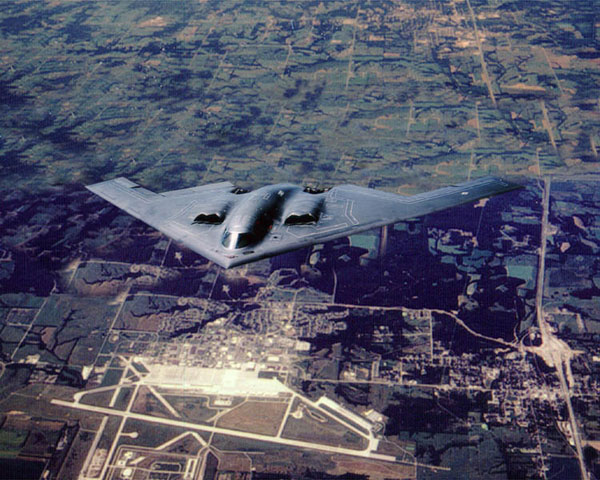
B-2 Spirit bomber making its flight over the Whiteman Air Force Base

GT 16's military training exercise started on the November 2, 2015.

==== Participants ====
- Barksdale AFB, Louisiana
- Minot AFB, North Dakota
- Whiteman AFB, Missouri
- F.E. Warren AFB, Wyoming
- Malmstrom AFB, Montana

=== Global Thunder 17 ===
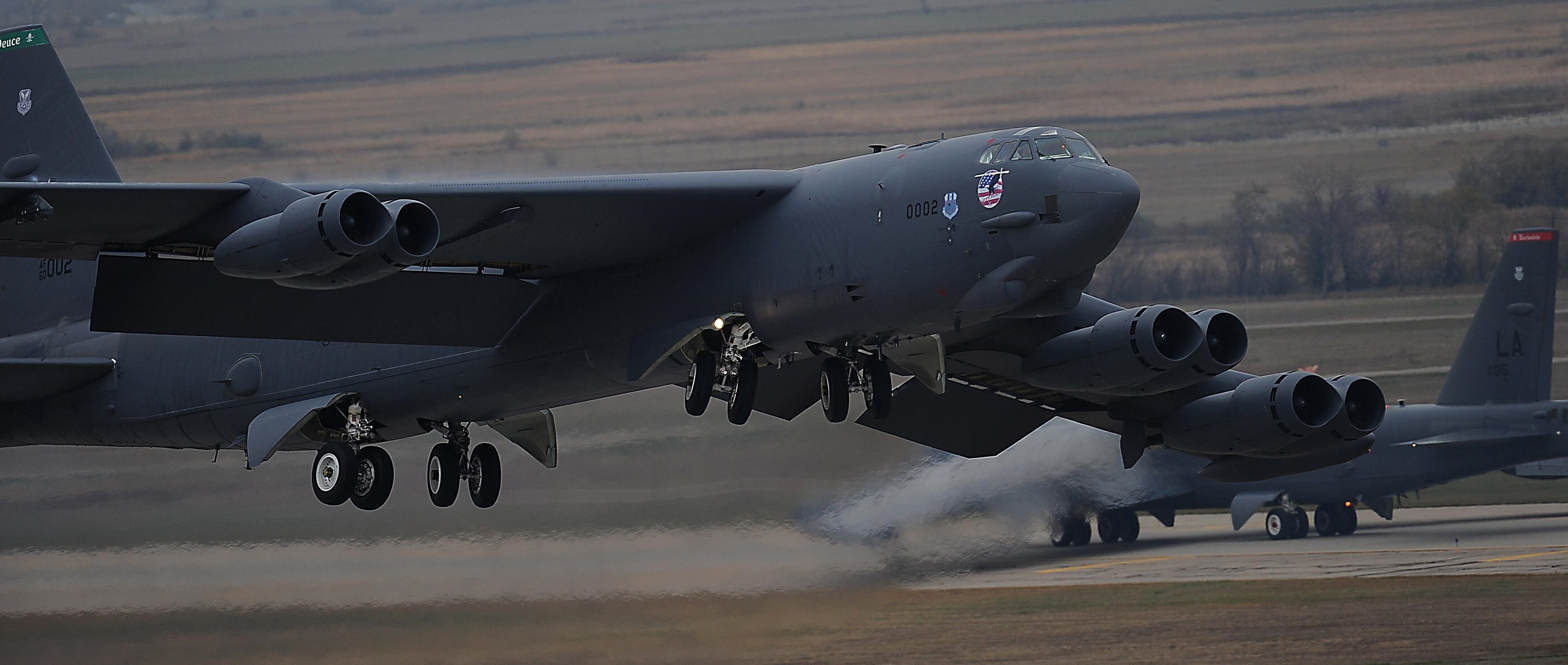
B-52H Stratofortress takes off from Minot Air Force Base for Global Thunder 17 training exercise on October 30, 2016.

GT 17 started on October 24, 2016, and concluded on October 31, lasting approximately 8 days.

=== Global Thunder 18 ===
GT 18 ended on November 7, 2017.

=== Global Thunder 26 ===
GT 26 began on October 21, 2025.
