= 91st Security Forces Group =

- Active: Currently Active
- Country: United States
- Branch: United States Air Force
- Type: Air force infantry
- Role: Force Protection, Nuclear Security
- Size: 900+
- Part of: 91st Missile Wing
- Base: Minot Air Force Base

Commanders
- Group Commander: Colonel Anthony S. McCarty
- Group Chief Enlisted Manager: CMSgt Kenneth W. Broughman

The 91st Security Forces Group falls under operational command of the 91st Missile Wing, and provides command and control for four squadrons—the 91st Missile Security Forces Squadron, 791st Missile Security Forces Squadron, 891st Missile Security Forces Squadron, and 91st Missile Security Operations Squadron – for the active defense of assets vital to national security. The 91st SFG ensures Security Forces are trained, organized and equipped to secure 150 Minuteman III missiles and Launch Facilities and 15 Missile Alert Facilities geographically separated throughout 8,500 square miles of the missile complex. All security support, including anti-terrorism, physical security measures and response forces for the 91st Missile Wing, are provided by the 91 SFG.

These units are the largest Security Forces contingent at Minot Air Force Base, being primarily responsible for maintaining the security of the Minuteman III missile silos in the surrounding area. When added together with the 5th Security Forces Squadron, Minot AFB has more Security Forces Airmen than any other installation in the Department of Defense.

== Significant Milestones/Events ==
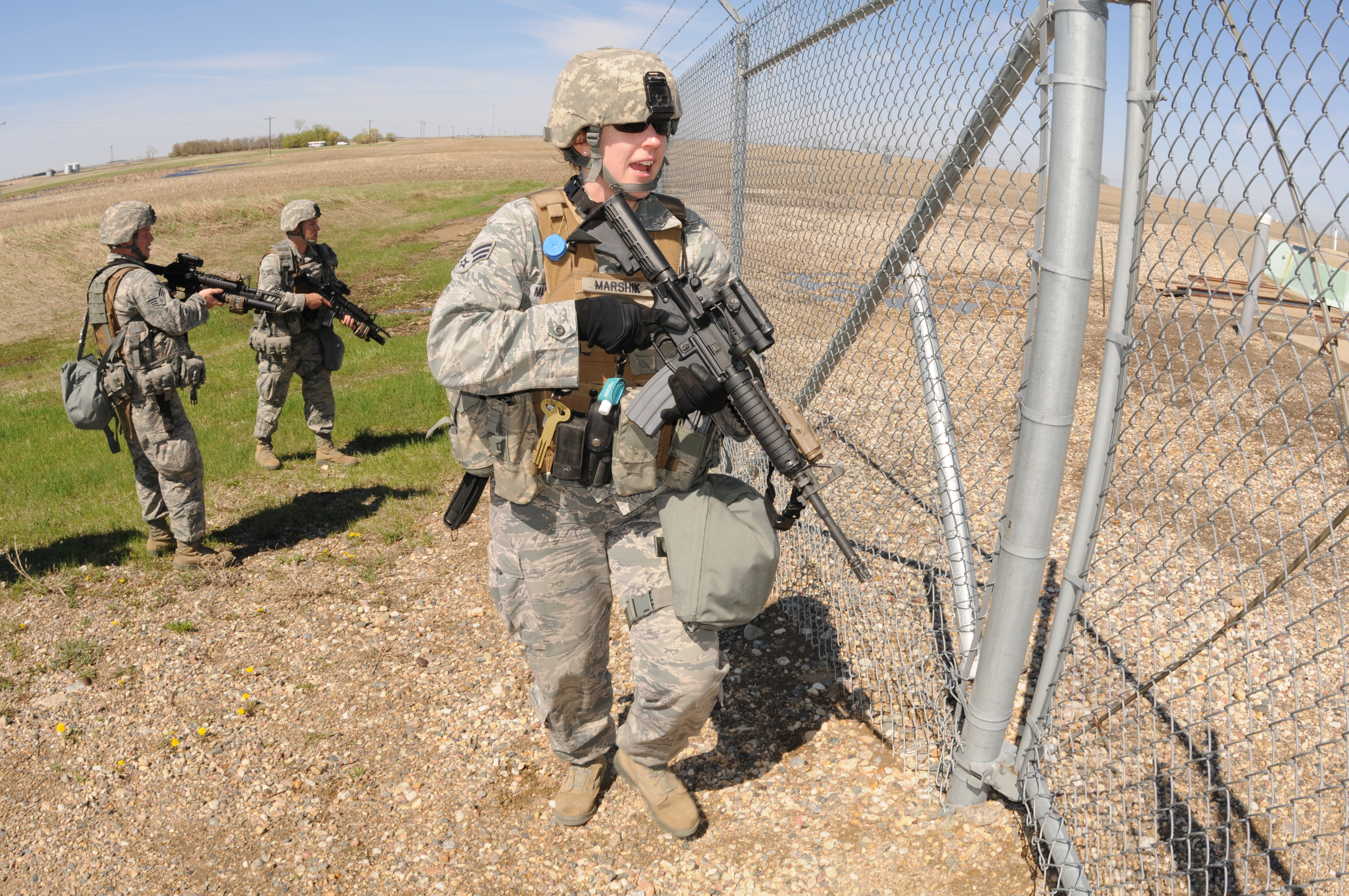
Members of the 91st Security Forces Group's 219th Security Forces Squadron during a training exercise in 2013

November 2016 – Missile Security Operating Concept (MSOC) was implemented as a Beta test, the brainchild of Col. Jason Beers.

November 2016 – 891st Missile Security Forces Squadron is created, but is considered a "shadow" unit during the Beta test of MSOC.

October 2017 – Missile Security Operating Concept is implemented across all three nuclear missile wings; Minot, Malmstrom and F.E. Warren

On 4 May 2018, it was announced that an ammo container of 40mm grenades utilized for a MK-19, was lost in the missile field

On 16 May 2018, the 91st SFG stated they were unable to account for an M-240 Machine Gun during a command wide inventory

On 23 May, Col. Jason Beers, 91st Security Forces Group commander relieved of duty, due to a loss of trust and confidence

== Lineage ==
- Constituted 25 September 1973 as 91st Security Police Group

Activated 1 October 1973
Redesignated 91st Missile Security Group on 15 December 1992
Inactivated c.. 1 July 1994

- Re-designated 91st Security Forces Group and activated c. 2003

=== Operational Units Assigned ===
Three squadrons composed of USAF Security Forces personnel are assigned. Their primary mission is to secure Protection Level 1 assets assigned to the 91st MW.
- 91st Missile Security Forces Squadron
- 791st Missile Security Forces Squadron "Dark Horses"
- 891st Missile Security Forces Squadron "Shadow Warriors" – activated November 2017
Initially conceived as part of the MSOC, the 891st was considered a shadow unit since November 2016, until it was officially created and command was assumed in November 2017. It is one of three operational Security Forces squadrons under the 91st SFG. It maintains a rotational posting of assigned Security Forces members within the missile field complex surrounding Minot Air Force Base.
- 91st Missile Security Operations Squadron
- 219th Missile Security Forces Squadron (attached from North Dakota Air National Guard)

=== Assignments ===
- 91st Strategic Missile Wing (later 91st Missile Wing, 91st Space Wing, 91st Missile Wing): 1 October 1973 – c.. 1 July 1994, c. 2003–present

=== Components ===
- 91st Security Police Squadron (later 91st Security Forces Squadron): 1 October 1973 – c.. 1 July 1994, c. 2003–present
- 91st Missile Security Squadron (later 91st Missile Security Forces Squadron): 1 October 1973 – c.. 1 July 1994, c. 2003–present
- 92d Missile Security Squadron: 1 October 1973 – c.. 1 July 1994
- 219th Security Forces Squadron (attached): 18 December 2008 – present
