= 5th Bomb Wing =

US Air Force unit

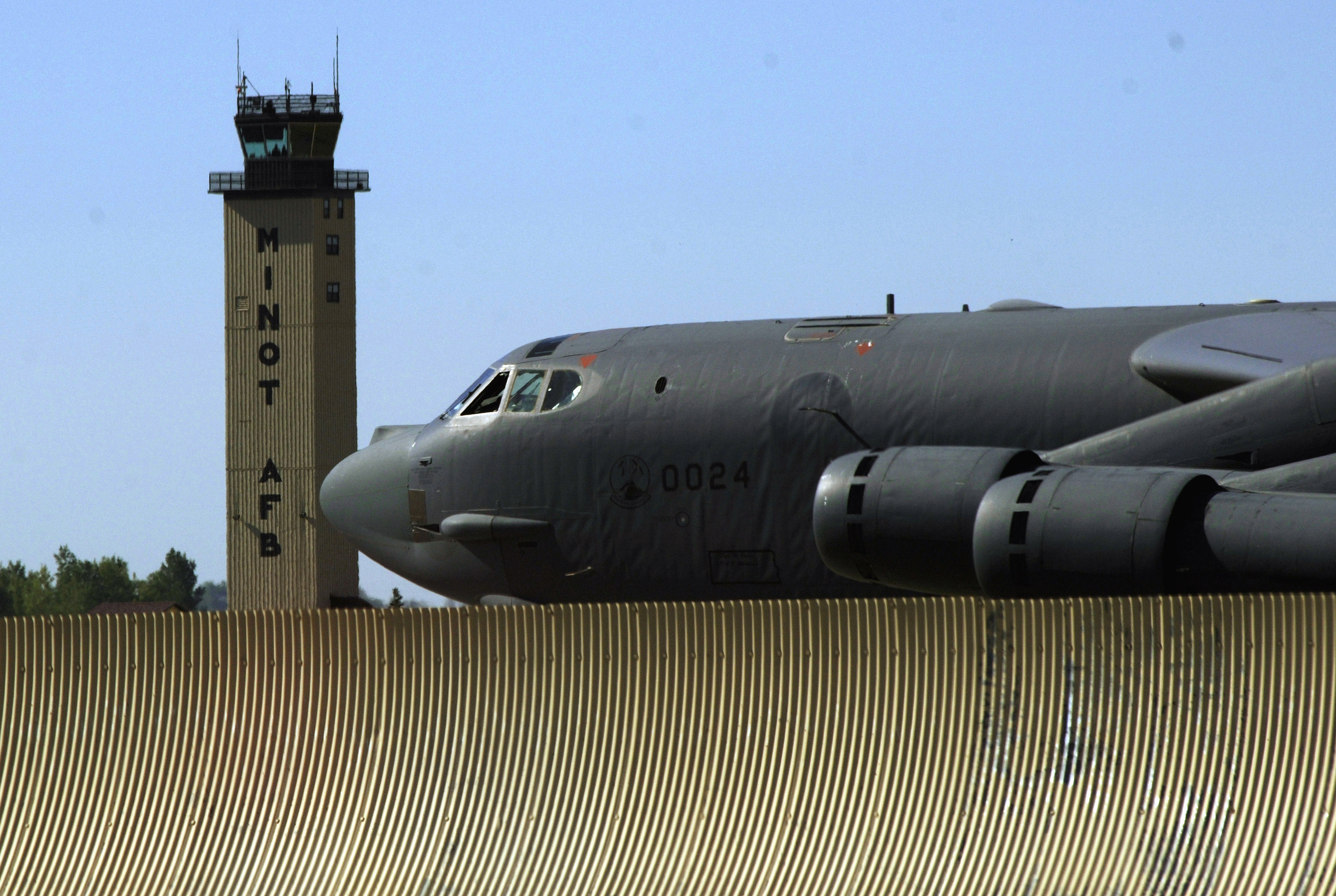
- A 5th Bomb Wing Boeing B-52 taxis past the Minot AFB tower
- Founded: 1949
- Country: United States
- Branch: United States Air Force
- Role: Bomber
- Part of: Air Force Global Strike Command; Eighth Air Force
- Garrison/HQ: Minot Air Force Base
- Nickname: the Warbirds
- Mottos: "Kiai o ka lewa" Hawaiian: Guardians of the Upper Realms
- Equipment: B-52H Stratofortress
- Engagements: World War II; Asiatic-Pacific theater (1941–1945); Vietnam War (1965–1968); Southwest Asia (1990–1991); Expeditionary Service (1990s); Kosovo War; War in Afghanistan (2001–2021); Iraq War (2003–2010); Operation Inherent Resolve
- Decorations: See honors

Commanders
- Current commander: Colonel John E. Burrell
- Vice commander: Colonel Thomas Taylor
- Command Chief: Chief Master Sergeant Scott D. Bradbury
- Notable commanders: Brigadier General Robert F. Travis, Brigadier General Edwin B. Broadhurst, Brigadier General William R. Hodges, Brigadier General Ralph Pasini

Insignia
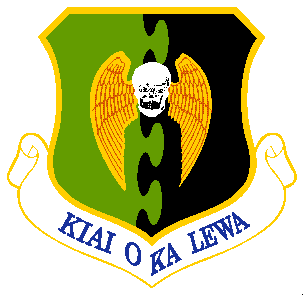
- 5th Bomb Wing emblem (approved 12 August 1954)

The 5th Bomb Wing (5 BW) is a United States Air Force unit assigned to Air Force Global Strike Command's Eighth Air Force. It is stationed at Minot Air Force Base, North Dakota. The wing is also the host unit at Minot. The 5 BW is one of only two active duty Boeing B-52H Stratofortress wings in the United States Air Force, the other being the 2nd Bomb Wing at Barksdale Air Force Base, Louisiana. Also, stationed at Barksdale Air Force Base, and operating the B-52H is a third unit, the 307th Bomb Wing, which is part of the Air Force Reserve Command.

Its 5th Operations Group is a successor organization of the 5th Group (Composite), one of the 15 original combat air groups formed by the Army before World War II.

On 7 December 1941, the 5th Bombardment Group suffered the loss of B-17 Flying Fortress and B-18 Bolo bombers when the Japanese attacked Pearl Harbor, but it sent two B-17s to search vainly for the Japanese task force. After the attack, the group patrolled the waters off the Hawaiian Islands until November 1942, taking part in the Battle of Midway (3–6 June 1942). Active for over 60 years, the 5 BW was a component wing of Strategic Air Command's heavy bomber deterrent force throughout the Cold War.

== Components ==
The 5 BW is part of the Air Force Global Strike Command's Eighth Air Force and is the host unit at Minot. Its current command staff consists of John E. Burrell, Wing Commander; and Chief Master Sergeant Scott D. Bradbury , Wing Command Chief. The wing includes a total force of approximately 5,470 military members as well as 722 civilian employees.

The 5 BW consists of the following units:

- 5th Operations Group: 16 July 1949 – 16 June 1952 (detached 12 November 1949 – 10 February 1951); 1 September 1991–present.
  - 23d Bomb Squadron ("Bomber Barons")
  - 69th Bomb Squadron ("Knighthawks")
  - 5th Operations Support Squadron
- 5th Maintenance Group
  - 5th Munitions Squadron
  - 5th Maintenance Squadron
  - 5th Maintenance Operations Squadron
  - 5th Aircraft Maintenance Squadron
  - 705th Munitions Squadron
- 5th Medical Group
  - 5th Medical Operations Squadron
  - 5th Medical Support Squadron
- 5th Mission Support Group
  - 5th Civil Engineer Squadron
  - 5th Communications Squadron
  - 5th Force Support Squadron
  - 5th Security Forces Squadron
  - 5th Contracting Squadron
  - 5th Logistics Readiness Squadron

As the host unit at Minot, the 5 BW also controls the special staff functions of the inspector general, wing plans, the chaplain, staff judge advocate, arms control, command post, public affairs, history, and safety. The 5th Comptroller Squadron also reports directly to the 5 BW commander.

== History ==
For additional history and lineage, see 5th Operations Group

=== Cold War ===
==== Strategic reconnaissance ====
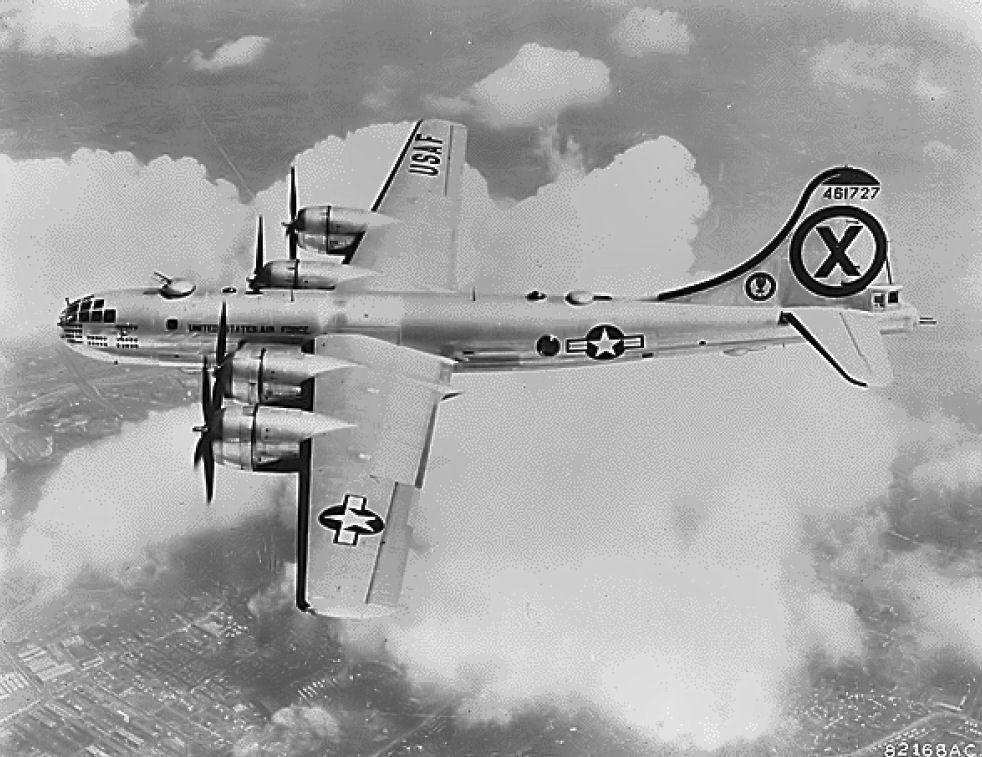
31st Strategic Reconnaissance Squadron RB-29 Superfortress 1949

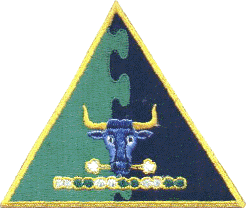
5th SRW patch (1949–1955)

The wing was established on 1 July 1949 and activated at Mountain Home Air Force Base, Idaho two weeks later. In November it moved to its permanent station at Fairfield-Suisun Air Force Base, California. Until 1958, the wing underwent several name and assignment changes while continually upgrading its aircraft. Performed long-range strategic reconnaissance, July 1949 – October 1955, with some limited reconnaissance to September 1958. Operational squadrons were 23d, 31st and 72d Strategic Reconnaissance Squadrons flying Boeing RB-17G/F-2/F-9/F-13 aircraft (1947–49) and beginning in 1948, Boeing RB-29 Superfortress aircraft until 1951.

The wing performed operations to probe the eastern borders of the Soviet Union and China. Little was known about the air defense capability of the Soviet Union at this time and the most effective way of determining their capability was to probe the borders and see whether they would respond. Initially, the RB-17Gs and later aircraft (RB-29, RB-36D) mapped the perimeter of the Soviet Air Defenses from the Baltic to the Sea of Okhotsk, north of Japan.

This mission, along with many others, found that west of the Bering Strait there was virtually no radar coverage. As a result of these missions, USAF war plans were drawn up which directed a massive bomber attack to hit Russia from this direction, flying on to land in the Middle East or Africa, or more likely bailing out as the aircraft ran out of fuel. Gradually, during the 1950s, the Soviets began filling in the gaps in their radar coverage over northern Siberia, but large gaps on the outer perimeter between Alaska and Murmansk were still wide open for many years to come.

The wing was fully integrated with the 9th Strategic Reconnaissance Wing from 12 November 1949 to 10 February 1951. It maintained a manned headquarters, but had no operational control over assigned units, and from 1 February 1950 to 10 February 1951 shared a commander in common with the 9th Wing. On 16 June 1954 the wing, along with SAC's other B-36 reconnaissance wings were assigned bombing as their primary mission. However, they retained their designations as reconnaissance wings until later.

==== Strategic bombardment ====
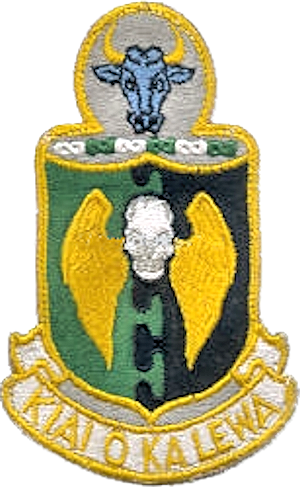
5th Bomb Wing (1950s) emblem

In June 1951, the wing began converting to the Convair RB-36D Peacemaker. Later, B-36J models were assigned to the wing and it began maintaining proficiency in strategic bombardment in July 1953 but the 5th was not redesignated as the 5th Bombardment Wing until October 1955.

While stationed at Travis Air Force Base, the wing entered the jet age in on 13 February 1959 when Strategic Air Command (SAC) assigned the wing SAC's first Boeing B-52G Stratofortresses. The 72d Squadron had departed for Mather Air Force Base, California the previous July, where it formed the nucleus of the 4134th Strategic Wing in a SAC program to disperse its Boeing B-52 Stratofortress bombers over a larger number of bases, thus making it more difficult for the Soviet Union to knock out the entire fleet with a surprise first strike. The 23d and 31st Squadrons began to convert to B-52s at Travis. With the conversion to B-52s, the wing gained the 916th Air Refueling Squadron and its KC-135A air refueling aircraft. However, as SAC continued to disperse its B-52 force, the 31st Squadron moved to Beale Air Force Base and was assigned to the 4126th Strategic Wing.

On 14 December 1960, a wing B-52G set a record breaking flight of 10,078.84 miles without refueling. The flight lasted 19 hours and 44 minutes. Starting in 1960, one third of the wing's aircraft were maintained on fifteen-minute alert, fully fueled and ready for combat to reduce vulnerability to a Soviet missile strike. This was increased to half the squadron's aircraft in 1962. The wing's 23d Bombardment Squadron and its people also saw combat over Southeast Asia during the Vietnam War. Its crews attacked targets in the region while supporting American and allied ground forces during Operation Arc Light between 1965 and 1968.

In December 1965, Secretary of Defense Robert S. McNamara directed a phaseout of a portion of SAC's B-52 force. As a result, SAC terminated its wing at Travis in the summer of 1968. In order to preserve the heritage of one of the oldest units in the air force, the wing moved on paper to Minot Air Force Base, North Dakota on 25 July 1968 and absorbed the resources of the 450th Bombardment Wing, which was inactivated. The 450th Wing's 906th Air Refueling Squadron was reassigned to the 5th Wing, while the 23d Bombardment Squadron replaced the 450th's 720th Bombardment Squadron. This move ended the wing's Southeast Asia deployments. At Minot, the wing flew the B-52H, which brought added vigor to its strategic deterrence mission. It also supported the post-attack command and control system (PACCS), July 1968 – December 1969.

In the summer of 1975, the wing gained the Boeing AGM-69A short range attack missile (SRAM), which enhanced the ability of the B-52H to penetrate and survive in this hostile environment. Armed with a nuclear warhead and equipped with a simple inertial guidance system, the AGM-69A was propelled to its range of 20 to 50 nautical miles (93 km) by a solid-propellant rocket motor. Each B-52 could carry up to 20 SRAMs, six on each of two wing pylons and eight on a rotary launcher located in the bomb bay.

Entering the 1990s, the 5th BW continued to set the standard as it deployed troops to the Persian Gulf as part of Operation Desert Shield. During the war's air campaign, the wing joined U.S. and coalition bombers and fighters to defeat Iraq’s air and ground forces.

In September 1991, the wing marked a historic moment in the final days of the Cold War when it pulled its aircraft from continuous alert status – a job it performed for 35 years. The wing was relieved of its air refueling mission in June 1992 On 1 June 1992, the 5th Wing became the 5th Bomb Wing following the activation of Air Combat Command.

=== From the 1990s ===
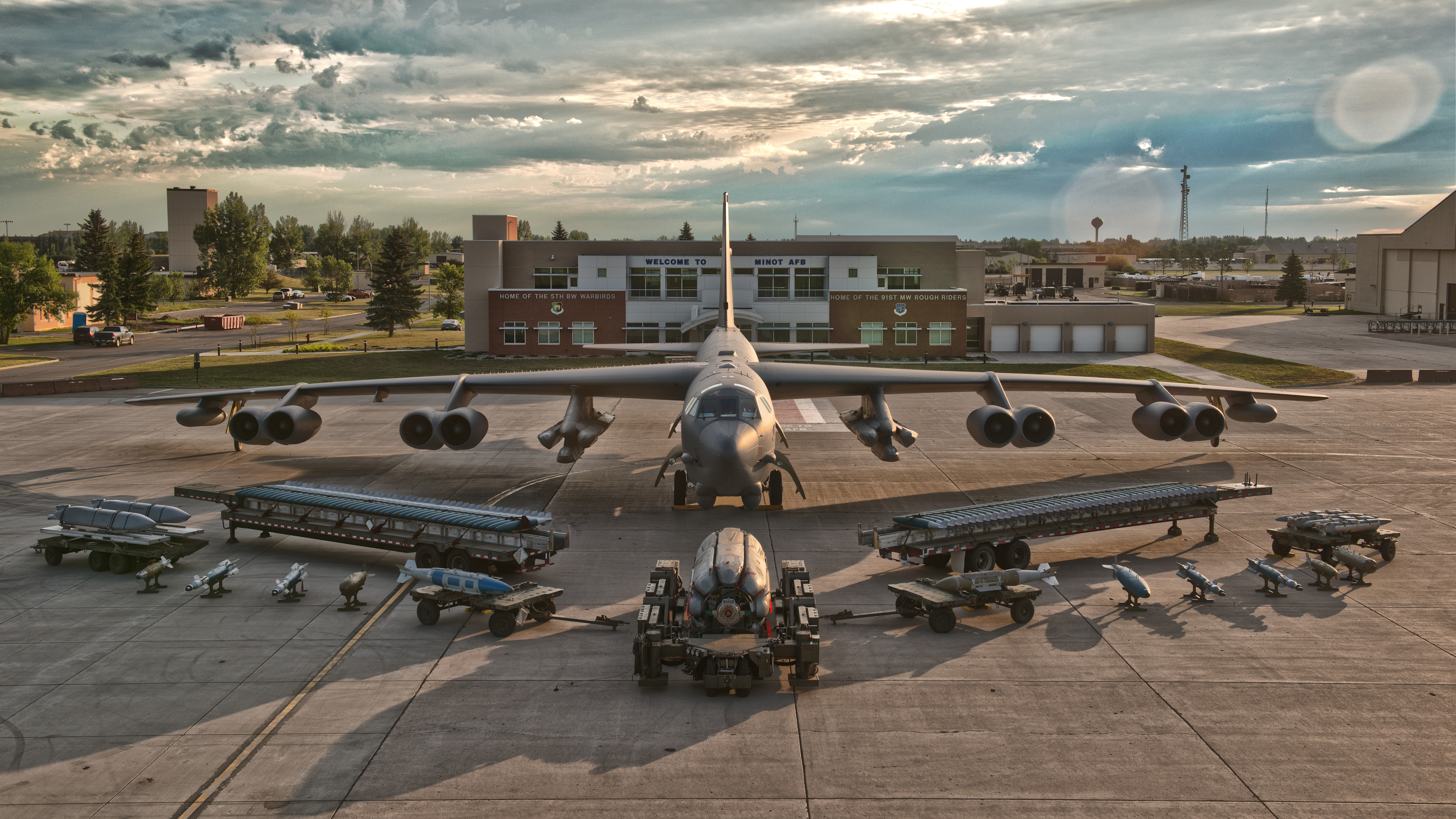
A 5th BW B-52H Stratofortress and munitions on display

The bomb wing saw combat again in the Persian Gulf during Operation Desert Fox in December 1998. Months later, three Minot B-52s and crews joined the 2d Air Expeditionary Group at RAF Fairford, England, in support of Operation Allied Force over the former Federal Republic of Yugoslavia.

Budgetary cuts in 1996 led to a need for further force reductions which reduced the 5th's B-52H fleet. The 72d Squadron was inactivated late in the year and their 12 aircraft were retired.

In the weeks following the 11 September 2001 attacks, the wing deployed in support of Operation Enduring Freedom. Flying from a forward operating location, bomber crews attacked strategic targets in Afghanistan to topple the Taliban regime.

In 2003, the wing deployed approximately 550 people and 14 B-52s to RAF Fairford, United Kingdom, within the U.S. European Command area of responsibility to fly combat missions as part of the 2003 invasion of Iraq. During the war, the wing's B-52s flew more than 120 combat missions and logged more than 1,600 combat flying hours. The bombers dropped more than 3 million pounds of weaponry, including conventional air-launched cruise missiles, joint direct attack munitions, gravity weapons, laser-guided bombs and leaflet dispensers. For the first time in combat history, a 5th BW crew employed a Litening II targeting pod to strike targets at an Iraqi airfield on 11 April 2003.

In March 2004, the wing sent six B-52s and over 300 support personnel to Andersen Air Force Base, Guam. The aircraft and crews supported U.S. Pacific Command operations to provide a stabilizing military force in the region.

In April 2005, the wing forward deployed aircraft and personnel to the 40th Air Expeditionary Wing to fly combat missions over Afghanistan. Flying a mix of close air support and strike missions, 5th BW crews ensured success of ground combat units in meeting their objectives.

Today, the 5th's B-52Hs are a major component of the USAF's strategic bombing force, alongside the Rockwell B-1B Lancer and the Northrop Grumman B-2A Spirit. The USAF is currently considering converting some of its B-52Hs to EB-52Hs to act as a stand-off electronic warfare platform. During Operation Allied Force (the bombing of Serbia undertaken in an attempt to halt the ethnic cleansing of Kosovo), the USAF found that additional jamming aircraft were needed to supplement the current fleet of Grumman EA-6 Prowler A and B variants. With modern technology and advanced weapons like the Joint Direct Attack Munition and AGM-159 JASSM, the wing's B-52 are expected to remain operational until the year 2040.

In 2007 the wing lost its commanding officer after Colonel Bruce Emig was removed in connection with the 2007 United States Air Force nuclear weapons incident, when negligent handling of nuclear weapons breached safety and security procedures. Emig was replaced by Joel S. Westa. Following that incident, the wing failed a nuclear surety inspection (NSI) conducted by the Defense Threat Reduction Agency in May 2008. The wing, however, kept its certification to perform missions and training with nuclear weapons.

On 30 October 2009 Westa was relieved as commander of the 5th Bomb Wing by Major General Floyd L. Carpenter, commander of Eighth Air Force. Carpenter stated that Westa was relieved due to his "inability to foster a culture of excellence, a lack of focus on the strategic mission ... and substandard performance during several nuclear surety inspections, including the newly activated 69th Bomb Squadron." Colonel Douglas A. Cox was appointed new wing commander. In January 2010, the 69th BS passed its initial NSI, and the wing as a whole passed a no-notice NSI.

In June 2010, the wing once again deployed aircraft and personnel to Guam as part of United States Pacific Command's continuous bomber presence mission. While providing forces for the continuous bomber presence, the wing also passed its Nuclear Surety Inspection in August 2010, and followed this 70 days later with a successful Nuclear Operational Readiness Inspection in November 2010.

In 2017, the wing deployed in support of Operation Inherent Resolve, targeted operations against the Islamic State.

== 'Ghost Rider' restoration ==
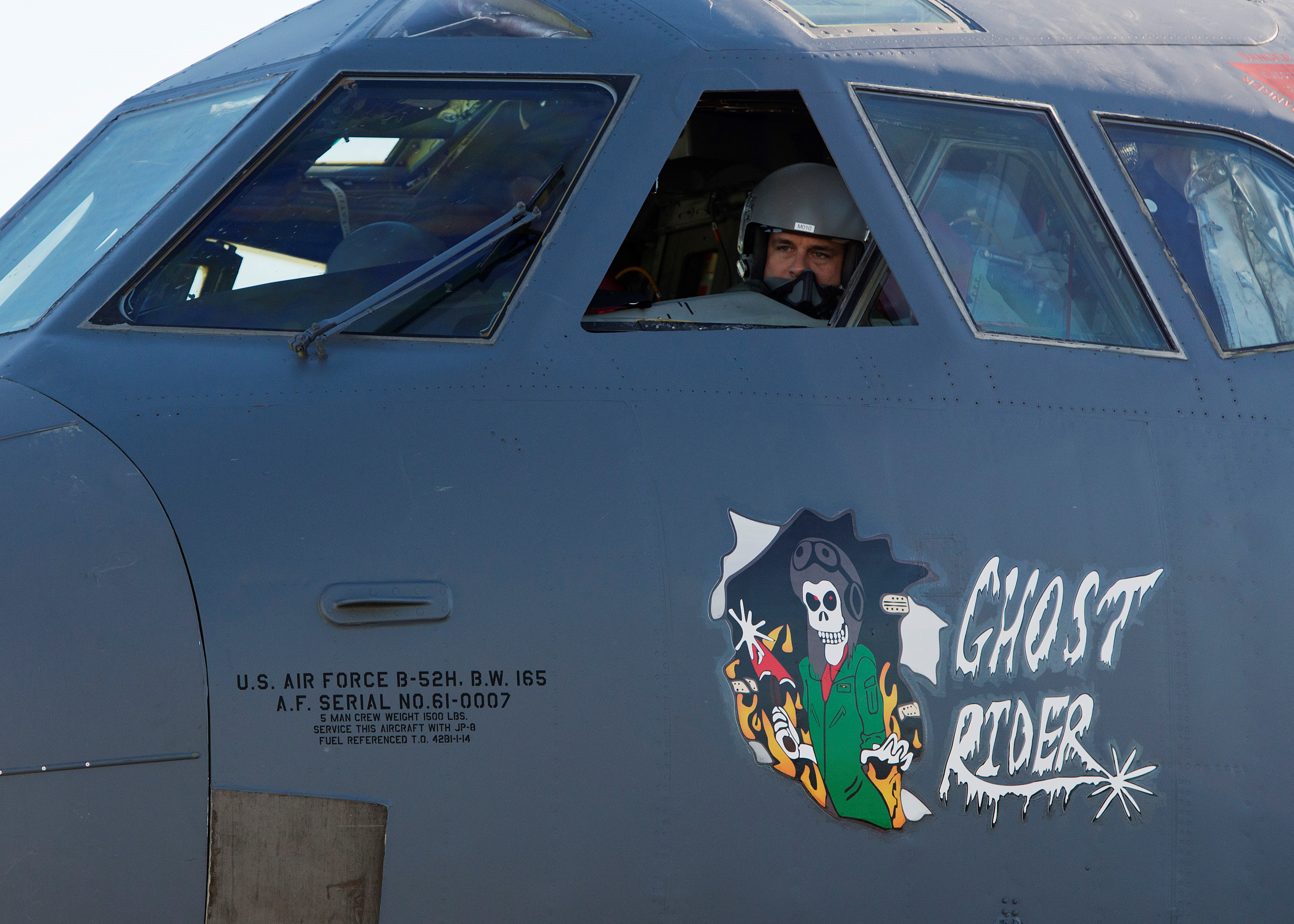
Lt. Col. Jeremy Holmes, 69th BS commander, peers out of a window of the B-52H Stratofortress 61-007 'Ghost Rider' at Minot AFB, 27 Sep 2016

B-52H 61-007 'Ghost Rider' made history when it became the first B-52 to ever be regenerated from long-term storage to flying condition. '61-007' had been in storage November 2008 at 309th Aerospace Maintenance and Regeneration Group at Davis-Monthan AFB, it took 19-months to prepare the 45-year-old bomber for flight. Colonel Keith Schultz (with 6500 hours had the most flight time on B-52s flying in the USAF) CO of the 307th Operations Group, 307th Bomb Wing at Barksdale AFB was in charge of the flight from Davis-Monthan AFB to Barksdale AFB on 13 January 2015. Co-pilot, Lt. Col. Darrell "Tim" Hines of the 10th Flight Test Squadron at Tinker AFB & radar-navigator Capt. Heath "Carl" Johnson of the 2nd Bomb Wing completed the crew.

While at Barksdale AFB, members of the 76th Aircraft Maintenance Group from Tinker AFB removed modifications from the fire damaged B-52H '61-0049' that 61-007 is replacing and transferred them to the newly restored bomber. On 14 December 2015 the bomber was then flown to Tinker AFB in Oklahoma for a full depot-level refurbishment. Tinker's portion of the $13M project was spread over 272 days, took 45,000 man-hours and was delivered 90 days earlier than planned.

Pilots of Tinker's 10th Flight Test Squadron flew the B-52 on six test flights to verify system functionality and to ensure the bomber was safe to fly on 13 September 2016. On 27 September 2016 'Ghost Rider' departed Tinker AFB to join the 5th Bomb Wing at Minot AFB.

=== Heraldry ===
The wing emblem was first approved for its 5th Operations Group in 1924 and features a winged human skull on a black and green background.

== Lineage ==
- Constituted as the 5th Strategic Reconnaissance Wing on 1 July 1949

Activated on 16 July 1949
Redesignated 5th Strategic Reconnaissance Wing, Heavy on 14 November 1950
Redesignated 5th Bombardment Wing, Heavy on 1 October 1955
Redesignated 5th Wing on 1 September 1991
Redesignated 5th Bomb Wing on 1 June 1992

=== Assignments ===
- 311th Air Division, 16 July 1949
- Second Air Force, 1 November 1949

Attached to 9th Strategic Reconnaissance Wing, 12 November 1949

- Fifteenth Air Force, 1 April 1950

Remained attached to 9th Bombardment Wing to 10 February 1951

- 14th Air (later, 14th Strategic Aerospace) Division, 10 February 1951

Attached to 3d Air Division, 14 January 1955 – 12 April 1955

- 810th Strategic Aerospace Division, 25 July 1968
- 47th Air Division, 30 June 1971
- Fifteenth Air Force, 30 November 1972 (attached to 810th Air Division, Provisional)
- 47th Air Division, 15 January 1973
- 57th Air Division, 22 January 1975
- Fifteenth Air Force, 14 June 1991
- Eighth Air Force, 1 September 1991 – present

=== Components ===
Groups

- 5th Strategic Reconnaissance (later, 5th Operations) Group: 16 July 1949 – 16 June 1952 (detached 12 November 1949 – 10 February 1951); 1 September 1991 – present

Squadrons

- 23d Strategic Reconnaissance (later, 23d Bombardment) Squadron: attached 10 February 1951 – 15 June 1952, assigned 16 June 1952 – 1 September 1991
- 31st Strategic Reconnaissance (later, 31st Bombardment) Squadron: attached 10 February 1951 – 15 June 1952, assigned 16 June 1952 – 1 October 1959, attached 2 October 1959 – 18 January 1960
- 72d Strategic Reconnaissance (later, 72d Bombardment) Squadron: attached 10 February 1951 – 15 June 1952, assigned 16 June 1952 – 1 July 1958
- 129th Strategic Reconnaissance Squadron: attached 14 October 1952 – 1 January 1953
- 347th Strategic Reconnaissance Squadron: attached 1 January 1953 – 12 September 1953
- 906th Air Refueling Squadron: 25 July 1968 – 1 September 1991
- 916th Air Refueling Squadron: 1 September 1959 – 25 July 1968

=== Stations ===
- Mountain Home Air Force Base, Idaho, 16 July 1949
- Fairfield-Suisun Air Force Base (later Travis Air Force Base), California, 12 November 1949
- Minot Air Force Base, North Dakota, 25 July 1968 – present

=== Major aircraft assigned ===
- Boeing B-29 Superfortress, 1949
- Boeing RB-29 Superfortress, 1949, 1951
- Convair RB-36D Peacemaker, 1951–1958
- Convair B-36J Peacemaker, 1953–1958
- Boeing B-52G Stratofortress, 1959–1968
- Boeing B-52H Stratofortress, 1968–present
- Boeing KC-135 Stratotanker, 1959–1968, 1968–1992
- Boeing EC-135, 1968–1969
- Northrop T-38 Talon, 1994–1995

=== Honors ===
==== Campaign streamers ====
- World War II: Central Pacific; Guadalcanal; New Guinea; Northern Solomons; Eastern Mandates; Bismarck Archipelago; Western Pacific; Leyte; Luzon; Southern Philippines

==== Decorations ====
- Distinguished Unit citations: Woleai Island, 18 April 1944 – 15 May 1944; Borneo, 30 September 1944
- Presidential Unit Citation (Navy): South Pacific, 1 December 1942 – 9 December 1942
- Philippine Presidential Unit Citation (WWII)
- Air Force Outstanding Unit Award with Combat "V" Device: 1 June 1999 – 31 May 2001
- Air Force Outstanding Unit awards (3): 1 July 1983 – 30 June 1984; 1 July 1985 – 30 June 1986; 1 July 1991 – 30 June 1993

==== Awards ====
- Won the Omaha Trophy as the outstanding wing in SAC for 1985
- Won the SAC Bombing and Navigation Competition and the Fairchild Trophy in 1988
- Received the Omaha Trophy from U.S. Strategic Command as the best strategic aircraft unit for 2000

== See also ==
- List of B-29 units of the United States Air Force
- List of B-52 Units of the United States Air Force
