= Minot Air Force Base =

US Air Force base near Minot, North Dakota

- Near Minot, North Dakota in the U.S.
- A B-52H Stratofortress of the 5th Bomb Wing sits on the MAFB flight-line as another takes off

Site information
- Type: US Air Force Base
- Owner: Department of Defense
- Operator: United States Air Force
- Controlled by: Air Force Global Strike Command (AFGSC)
- Condition: Operational
- Website: www.minot.af.mil

Location
- Location in the United States Location in North Dakota
- Coordinates: 48°24′57″N 101°21′29″W

Site history
- Built: 1956 – 1957
- In use: 1957 – present

Garrison information
- Current commander: Colonel Jesse W. Lamarand
- Garrison: 5th Bomb Wing (Host); 91st Missile Wing

Airfield information
- Identifiers: IATA: MIB, ICAO: KMIB, FAA LID: MIB, WMO: 727675
- Elevation: 507.7 metres (1,666 ft) AMSL
Runways
Direction	Length and surface
12/30	4,022.7 metres (13,198 ft) concrete

Minot Air Force Base (/ˈmaɪnɒt/ MY-not; IATA: MIB, ICAO: KMIB, FAA LID: MIB) is a United States Air Force (USAF) installation in Ward County, North Dakota, thirteen miles (20 km) north of the city of Minot via U.S. Route 83. In the 2020 census, the base was counted as a CDP with a total population of 5,017, down from 5,521 in 2010. Minot AFB is the home of two major wings: the 5th Bomb Wing and 91st Missile Wing, both of the Air Force Global Strike Command (AFGSC).

Originally opened 69 years ago in 1957 as an Air Defense Command (ADC) base, Minot AFB became a major Strategic Air Command (SAC) base in the early 1960s, with both nuclear armed intercontinental ballistic missiles and manned bombers, supported with aerial refueling aircraft.

When SAC was inactivated in 1992, the nuclear mission of the base was divided between two commands, with missiles going to the Air Force Space Command (AFSPC) and manned bombers to the Air Combat Command (ACC). With the establishment of AFGSC in 2009, missiles and manned bombers (excluding the B-1 Lancer) were transferred from AFSPC and ACC to AFGSC in late 2009 and early 2010.

== History ==
Construction of Minot AFB began in May 1956 and it officially opened on January 10, 1957, named for the nearby city of Minot. The base is approximately forty miles (65 km) south of the 49th parallel, the international border with Canada, and the tripoint of North Dakota with the Canadian provinces of Saskatchewan and Manitoba.

=== Air Defense Command ===
The initial USAF host unit was the Air Defense Command (ADC) 32d Air Base Group, activating on 8 February 1957.

The ADC 32d Fighter Group was the first operational unit at Minot, with its 433d Fighter-Interceptor squadron. However, no aircraft were assigned to the unit, and January 1958 the 433d FIS was inactivated. It was replaced in February 1960 by the 5th Fighter-Interceptor Squadron (The Spittin' Kittens), transferred to Minot from Suffolk County AFB on Long Island, New York. The 5th FIS flew the F-106 Delta Dart and later the F-15A Eagle.

A Semi Automatic Ground Environment (SAGE) facility was built and activated in June 1961. The DC-19 SAGE Data Center was housed in a huge, windowless blast-resistant concrete building with a pair of 275-ton AN/FSQ-7 computers which displayed the live air picture to the many scopes of the weapons and air surveillance operations in the various units on the 2nd floor. The computers processed air surveillance information and sent the data to Air Defense Command units. It was the only two-story SAGE blockhouse in ADC. The Minot SAGE facility was deactivated after less than two years of operation, in May 1963, The facility was then renamed the PRIDE Building ("Professional Results in Daily Effort") after ADC's and SAC's alternate motto of the 1960s and 1970s, and became a large office building housing many different organizations.

Renamed Aerospace Defense Command in 1968, ADC F-106 operations continued at Minot until ADC was inactivated in 1979 and replaced by Air Defense Tactical Air Command, a part of Tactical Air Command.

=== Strategic Air Command ===
Strategic Air Command (SAC) initially had units assigned to Minot AFB in 1958 for air refueling support. The 4136th Strategic Wing was formed 1 September 1958, consisting of the 906th Air Refueling Squadron, followed by the 4136th Combat Defense Squadron that was activated on 1 June 1959. The first SAC KC-135A Stratotanker assigned, nicknamed "Miss Minot," arrived on 23 September 1959 and remained on base until the 906th Air Refueling Squadron was relocated to Grand Forks AFB in northeast North Dakota in January 1994. This aircraft was notable for its tail flash – "The Sun Never Sets on the 906th".

The scope of operations grew as the Air Force transferred the 525th Bombardment Squadron from the 19th Bombardment Wing at Homestead AFB, Florida, on March 8, 1961, followed by the first B-52H Stratofortress on 10 July 1961, nicknamed "Peace Persuader". This was preceded by the activation of the 60th Munitions Maintenance Squadron on 1 December 1960, followed by 4136th Armament & Electronics Maintenance Squadron, 4136th Field Maintenance Squadron, and 4136th Organizational Maintenance Squadron 1 March 1961, with the 4136th Airborne Missile Maintenance Squadron being added in November 1962. Demonstrating the capabilities of the B-52, on 10–11 January 1962 a B-52H from the 4136th Strategic Wing at Minot set a new world distance record, flying unrelieved 12,532 miles (20,168 km) from Kadena AB, Okinawa to Torrejon AB, Spain.

On 1 February 1963, SAC, as part of a conversion to unit designations with historical significance, activated the 450th Bombardment Wing at Minot and the 720th Bombardment Squadron, along with the formation of the 450th Airborne Missile Maintenance Squadron, 450th Armament & Electronics Maintenance Squadron, 450th Field Maintenance Squadron, and the 450th Organizational Maintenance Squadron simultaneously.

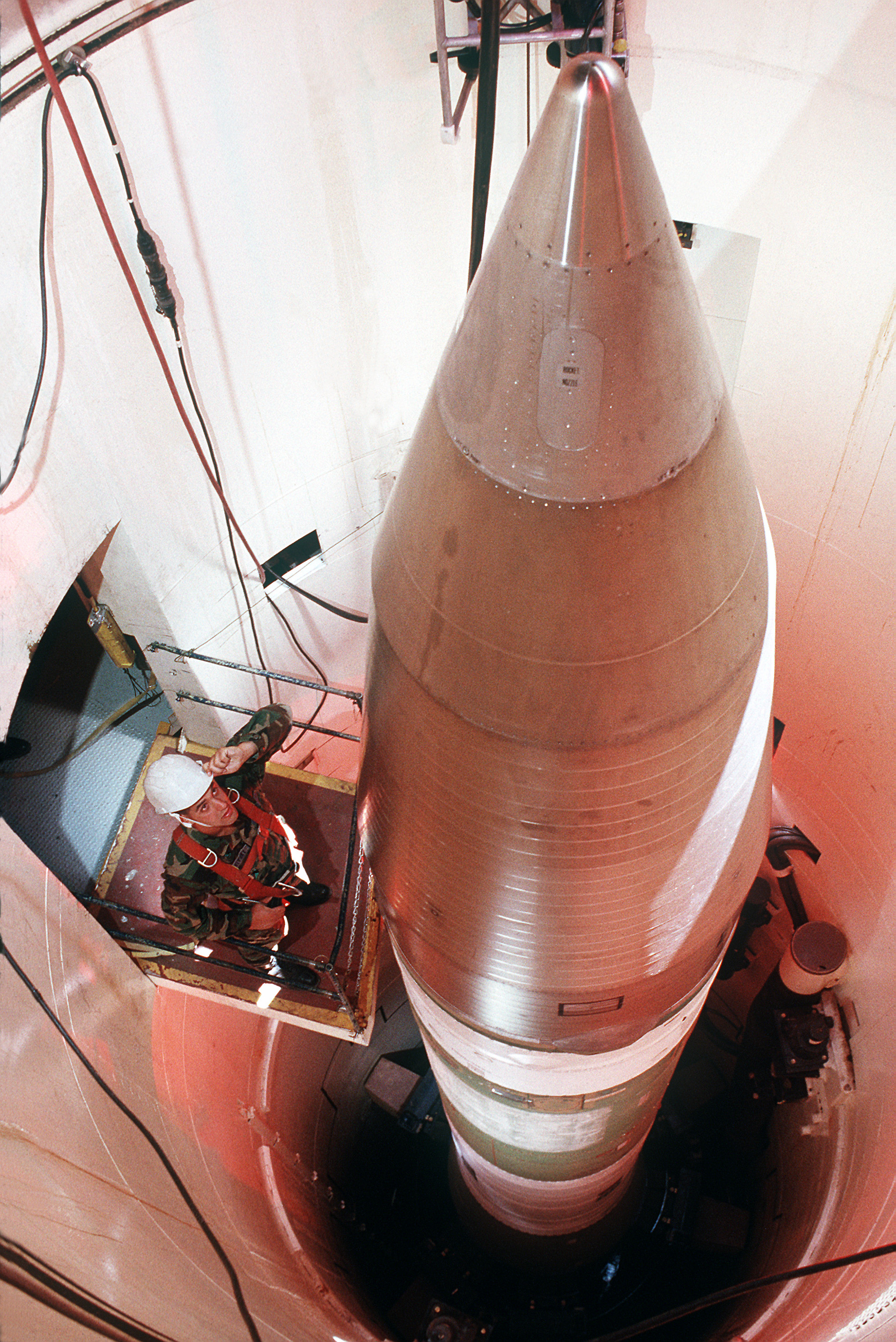
Minuteman III in silo (1989, Grand Forks AFB)

In 1961, the Air Force selected the land around Minot for a new Minuteman I ICBM complex. The 455th Strategic Missile Wing was activated in December 1962 along with the 455th Missile Maintenance Squadron. The 740th and 741st Strategic Missile Squadrons operationally controlled the ICBMs and in January 1963, the 742d Strategic Missile Squadron was activated with a third squadron of Minuteman ICBMS. During the 1970s, the 150 missile sites around the region, 10–70 miles (16–113 km) from the base, were converted to Minuteman IIIs; a model of the older Minuteman I stands at the Minot AFB main gate.

Command of Minot AFB passed from Air Defense Command to SAC in July 1962 as the base's primary mission changed from air defense to strategic deterrence. The new command unit, the 810th Air Division was organized along with the 862d Combat Support Group as the host unit for the base. Units assigned to the 862d Combat Support Group were the 862d Civil Engineering Squadron, the 862d Combat Defense Squadron (later redesignated 862d Security Police Squadron), the 862d Food Service Squadron (later redesignated 862d Services Squadron), 862d Operations Squadron (later redesignated 862d Communications Squadron), 862d Supply Squadron and 862d Transportation Squadron, The 862d Medical Group was also formed and reported to the Commander, 810th Air Division.

In July 1968, the 450th Bombardment Wing and 455th Strategic Missile Wing were inactivated, being from Travis AFB, California, when jurisdiction of Travis was assumed by the Military Airlift Command and the 91st Strategic Missile Wing from Glasgow AFB, Montana, when it closed. These changes were in line with the Air Force policy of keeping active those units with the most illustrious histories. The 23d Bombardment Squadron assumed operational control of all B-52 aircraft for the 5th Bombardment Wing. Unit Designations Assigned at Minot on June 25, 1968 were the 5th Bombardment Wing and 23rd Bombardment Squadron, 5th Airborne Missile Maintenance Squadron, 5th Armament & Electronics Maintenance Squadron (later redesignated as the 5th Avionics Maintenance Squadron), 5th Field Maintenance Squadron, 5th Organizational Maintenance Squadron & the 5th Munitions Maintenance Squadron. 91st Strategic Missile Wing [Minuteman], 91st Missile Maintenance Squadron.

On July 2, 1969 the 862d Medical Group was renamed the USAF Hospital. Minot, and the 862d Services Squadron was inactivated; its functions were assumed by the 862d Combat Support Group.

The 810th Strategic Aerospace Division was inactivated 30 June 1971, and was replaced by the 5th Bombardment Wing.

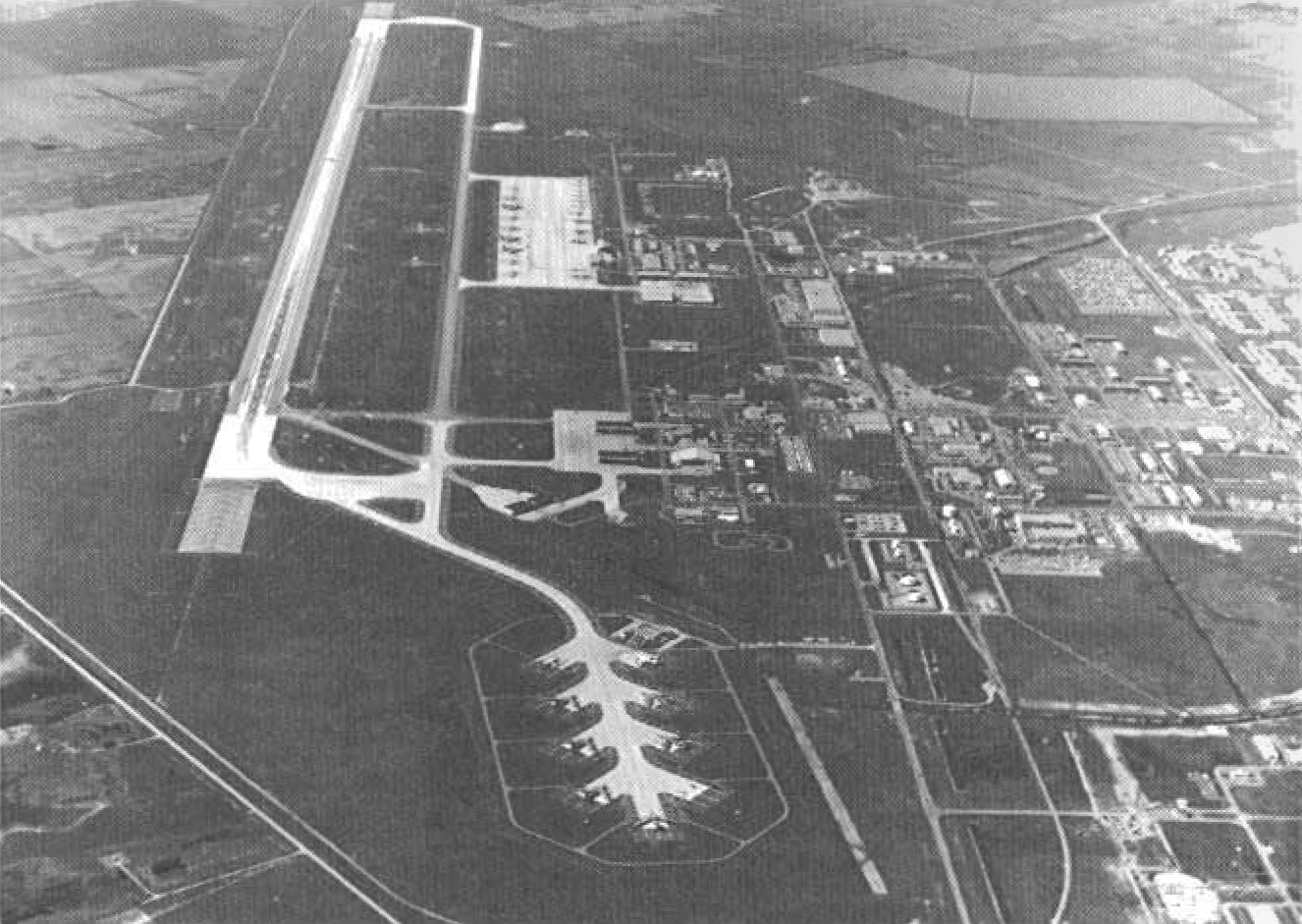
Approaching runway 29 at Minot AFB in 1973, alert ramp "Christmas tree" at bottom center

The 862d Combat Support Group was inactivated on July 31, 1972, with host unit duties being taken over by the 91st Combat Support Group (SAC). Under SAC policy, missile wings were fixed in locations, where aircraft units were considered a mobile and the host units were assigned to the missile wings. Units assigned to the 91st Combat Support Group were the 91st Civil Engineering Squadron, the 91st Security Police Squadron, 91st Communications Squadron, 91st Supply Squadron and 91st Transportation Squadron, The USAF Hospital, MINOT.

The 4th Airborne Command & Control Squadron (ACCS) at Ellsworth AFB, SD maintained two EC-135 Airborne Launch Control Center (ALCC) aircraft on forward deployed alert at MAFB for Airborne Launch Control System (ALCS) coverage of Minuteman ICBM Wings at Malmstrom AFB, MT; Minot AFB, ND; and Grand Forks AFB, ND. The ALCS provided a survivable launch capability for Minuteman ICBMs if their ground-based Launch Control Centers were incapacitated or destroyed.

Late in 1973 a second Alert Parking Ramp ("Christmas Tree") was added across runway 29, to the south. The 416th Bombardment Wing, from Griffiss AFB in central New York, maintained two B-52G aircraft with AGM-28B Hound Dog Missiles and two KC-135A aircraft along with two KC-135 Aircraft from the 380th Bombardment Wing at Plattsburgh AFB in northeast New York. On 2 January 1975, the 57th Air Division was activated at MAFB, and on 30 September 1975, the 91st Missile Maintenance Squadron was replaced by the 91st Field Missile Maintenance Squadron, and the 91st Organizational Missile Maintenance Squadron.

Following the Iran hostage crisis of 1979–81, SAC tasked the former 57th Air Division to organize the Strategic Projection Force. The 57th AD became the host unit, providing logistical, security, administrative and other support services to the 5th BMW, 91st SMW and tenant organizations.

In the early 1990s, the base prepared for change as the Air Force directed reorganization, and the 5th Bomb Wing assumed host base responsibilities.

==== Cold War aircraft incidents ====
- A KC-135A tanker (AF Ser. No. 58-0026) from March AFB crashed shortly after takeoff from Minot AFB on 17 January 1968, killing 12 of the 13 on board. Major General Charles M. Eisenhart, vice commander of the Fifteenth Air Force, was at the controls and over-rotated at takeoff in low visibility, inducing a stall. The survivor, a steward, was badly burned and later succumbed. On a staff visit from March AFB, the aircraft was departing for Glasgow AFB, Montana.
- In the early hours of October 4, 1968, a Minot B-52H (AF Ser. No. 60-0027) was on approach, completing an overnight training mission with six aboard. It lost power to four engines and crashed in a field eight miles (13 km) east, with four fatalities and two survivors. Among the dead was a lieutenant colonel just days from retirement, and the squadron clerk, on his first B-52 orientation ride.
- A B-52H (AF Ser. No. 61-0037) crashed shortly after a midday takeoff on 21 January 1969 and burst into flames on a farm about 0.8 miles (1.3 km) west of the runway, killing all six crew members. An incorrect preflight fuel load distribution caused a stall on takeoff after a climb to 200–300 feet (60–90 m) and it made several pitch gyrations prior to the crash.
- During a training flight on March 10, 1969, a Minot F-106A (AF Ser. No. 59-0014) crashed into the western portion of Lake Sakakawea, about fifty miles (80 km) southwest of the base. The pilot ejected safely to land and the plane sank below the frozen surface. It was not located until over 35 years later, in September 2004, after an extended search by a local surveyors' group.
- While being refueled on the ramp early on 14 November 1975, a B-52H (61-0033) caught fire and exploded. Two refueling personnel were killed and the aircraft was destroyed.

=== Post-Cold War ===
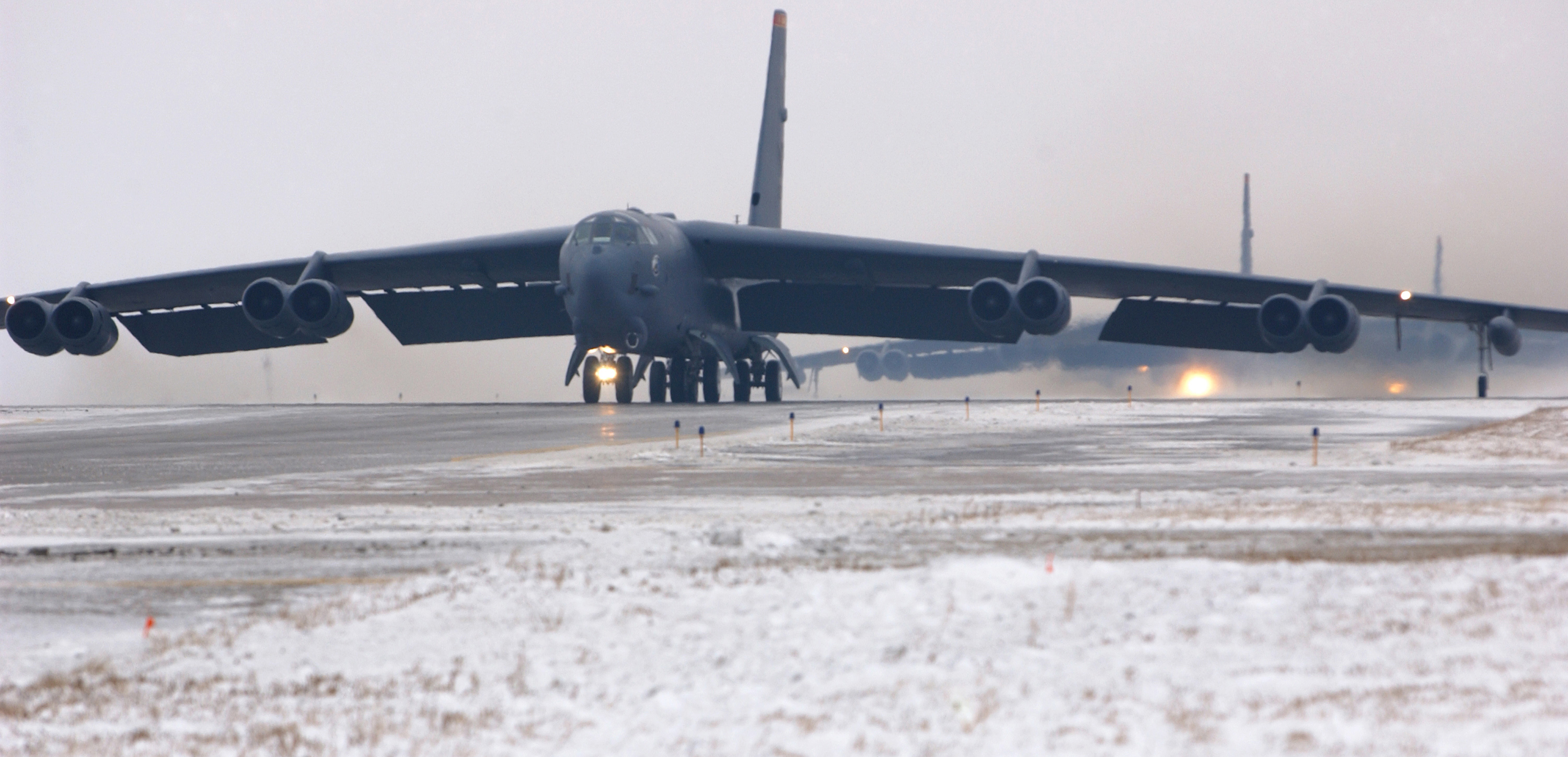
A B-52H Stratofortress taxis during an alert exercise at Minot Air Force Base during March 2006.

On June 1, 1992, Air Combat Command (ACC) was formed, following the inactivation of the Strategic Air Command. ACC absorbed the former assets of SAC, along with command responsibilities for the Eighth Air Force, and through it, the 5th Bomb Wing and host command of Minot AFB.

In 1993 control of the ICBM force was transferred by ACC to Air Force Space Command; the 91st Missile Wing was assigned to AFSPC on July 1, 1993.

==== Global Strike Command ====
The 91st Missile Wing was transferred to the new Air Force Global Strike Command (AFGSC) on December 1, 2009, and the 5th Bomb Wing officially transferred to AFGSC on February 1, 2010.

==== Nuclear weapons incident ====
On August 30, 2007, a B-52 took off from Minot AFB carrying six cruise missiles with W-80 nuclear warheads to Barksdale AFB in northwest Louisiana. No base personnel nor the crew knew the nuclear weapons were aboard. This incident received international attention. An investigation found that this was an isolated incident and that only a few people had information on the whereabouts of the missiles.

While U.S. policy is to neither confirm nor deny the presence of nuclear weapons, Air Force officials acknowledged the presence of nuclear weapons on the base, including the W80-1 warhead.

==== Nuclear inspection and consequences ====
On July 12, 2008, three Air Force officers fell asleep while in control of an electronic component that contained old launch codes for nuclear intercontinental ballistic missiles, a violation of procedure, Air Force officials said. The Air Force said the launch codes were outdated and had been deactivated before the incident, but it was still a violation of protocol, prompting an investigation. It was the fourth incident within a year involving problems with secure handling of components of America's nuclear weapons. The incident occurred during the changing out of components used to facilitate secure communications between an underground missile-control facility and missile silos near Minot Air Force Base in North Dakota, according to Col. Dewey Ford, a spokesman for the Air Force Space Command in Colorado. One of the parts, a code component, is for storage and processing. It is considered classified by the Air Force. A code component was removed from the equipment at the remote missile-control facility and replaced with a new code component. That made the old component inoperable, but an Air Force source said old launch codes were still contained in the part.

Under standard procedure, the four-officer crew of the facility is supposed to keep the component secure until it is returned to the base. Ford said the crew took the component to a building above the facility and locked the component in a lockbox. Then, three of the four crew members fell asleep. This violated Air Force procedure, which calls for at least two of the crew members to remain awake while in control of the component. At the time they were asleep, the crew and the component were in a locked building that is guarded by at least one armed airman at all times. The airmen were asleep for two to three hours, Ford said. The component was later returned to the Minot base, and the investigations of procedural violations were started by Air Force Space Command, the 20th Air Force and the National Security Agency. The investigation revealed the codes were not compromised, according to the Air Force. The codes had remained secured, and the crew was inside an area protected by Air Force security at all times, the investigation concluded. The incident, which was first made public by the Project on Government Oversight, was the fourth misstep involving the handling of America's nuclear weapons in one year. The three officers were given non-judicial punishment and subsequently discharged from the Air Force.

In fall 2009, Minot suffered another embarrassment when the newly formed 69th Bomb Squadron failed its Initial Nuclear Surety Inspection (INSI). As a result, both the 5th Bomb Wing and 5th Operations Support Squadron Commanders were relieved of command by the 8th Air Force Commander under the later discredited "perfection is the standard" philosophy. Subsequently, it was determined the 8th Air Force Commander had acted vindictively, outside his authority and used the firings to deflect attention away from institutional, organizational and leadership failings at both 8th Air Force and Air Combat Command.

Another incident first reported in May 2013 by the Associated Press revealed that 17 officers in charge of maintaining the base's Minuteman III nuclear missiles were "sidelined" for numerous violations of safety procedures. The deputy commander of the base complained of "rot" in the staff's discipline and command structure. The Associated Press obtained an internal email from the deputy commander and the news of the incident had garnered the attention of then Defense Secretary Chuck Hagel, who "demanded details" of the incident. The unit in charge of maintaining the nuclear missiles performed poorly during an inspection that took place in March 2013. Following the release of the Deputy Commander's strongly worded internal email, the Air Force began investigating the incident further.

=== Major Commands to which assigned ===
- Air Defense Command, May 19, 1956 – June 30, 1962
- Strategic Air Command, July 1, 1962 – June 1, 1992
- Air Combat Command, June 1, 1992 – February 1, 2010
  - Air Force Space Command (Tenant), July 1, 1993 – December 1, 2009
  - Air Force Global Strike Command (Tenant), December 1, 2009 – February 1, 2010
- Air Force Global Strike Command, February 1, 2010 – present

=== Major units assigned ===
- 810th Air Division, July 1, 1962 – July 31, 1972
- 4136th Strategic Wing, September 1, 1958 – February 1, 1963
- 450th Bombardment Wing, February 1, 1963 – July 25, 1968
- 5th Bombardment Wing

Redesignated 5th Bomb Wing, July 25, 1968 – present

- 91st Strategic Missile Wing

Redesignated: 91st Missile Wing, June 25, 1968 – present

- 17th Munitions Squadron, October 9, 2009 – present
- Minot Air Defense Sector, April 1, 1959 – August 15, 1963
- 32d Fighter Group, February 8, 1957 – February 1, 1961

32d Air Base Squadron, February 8, 1957 – 1 February 1961

- 32d Fighter Wing (Air Defense), February 1, 1961 – July 1, 1962

32d Air Base Group, 1 February 1961 – July 1, 1962

- 5th Fighter-Interceptor Squadron, February 1, 1960 – July 1, 1988 (F-106 / F-15)
- 433d Fighter-Interceptor Squadron, November 1, 1957 – January 8, 1958 (F-89C)

== Role and operations ==
=== 5th Bomb Wing ===
The 5th Bomb Wing (5 BW) is an element of the Global Strike Command (AFGSC) and is the host unit at Minot AFB; its commander is dual-hatted as the installation commander and the unit is responsible for all base services, such as housing/billeting, medical, MWR, library, Officers' Club, etc. The primary mission of the 5th Bomb Wing is to maintain and operate B-52H bombers assigned to the 23d Bomb Squadron and the 69th Bomb Squadron. Minot AFB is one of two remaining bases with B-52s; the other is Barksdale AFB in Bossier City, Louisiana.

The 5th Bomb Wing is composed of:

- 5th Operations Group, which provides the aircrews who fly the wing's B-52H aircraft. (Tail Code: "MT")
  - 23rd Bomb Squadron (B-52H) "Barons" Red/yellow Tail Stripe
  - 69th Bomb Squadron (B-52H) "Knighthawks" Gray/yellow Tail Stripe
  - 5th Operations Support Squadron "Ironmen" Blue/Yellow
- 5th Mission Support Group
  - 5th Civil Engineer Squadron
  - 5th Communications Squadron
  - 5th Contracting Squadron
  - 5th Force Support Squadron
  - 5th Logistics Readiness Squadron
  - 5th Security Forces Squadron
- 5th Maintenance Group supports the operations of both the 5th Bomb Wing and 91st Missile Wing. It provides on- and off-equipment maintenance on B-52Hs, and special support on Minuteman III missiles and UH-1N helicopters. The group also provides munitions, aircraft maintenance and maintenance operations support.
  - 5th Aircraft Maintenance Squadron
  - 5th Maintenance Operations Squadron
  - 5th Maintenance Squadron
  - 705th Munitions Squadron, (formerly 17th Munitions)
- 5th Medical Group offers outpatient services including family practice, dental, pediatrics, aerospace medicine, physical therapy, optometry and Women's Health Care. The group consists of the 5th Medical Operations Squadron and 5th Medical Support Squadron.

=== 91st Missile Wing ===
The 91st Missile Wing (91 MW) of the Global Strike Command (AFGSC) is responsible for maintaining the Minuteman III nuclear missiles, located in three main fields to the north, west, and south of the base. Previously known as the 91st Space Wing, it was renamed as a missile wing in June 2008. It is one of the Air Force's three operational intercontinental ballistic missile units, with Malmstrom AFB at Great Falls, Montana, and F.E. Warren AFB at Cheyenne, Wyoming. In addition to its missiles, the wing also operates a squadron of UH-1N Twin Huey helicopters in support of missile and launch control sites.

Operational groups of the 91st wing are:

==== 91st Operations Group ====
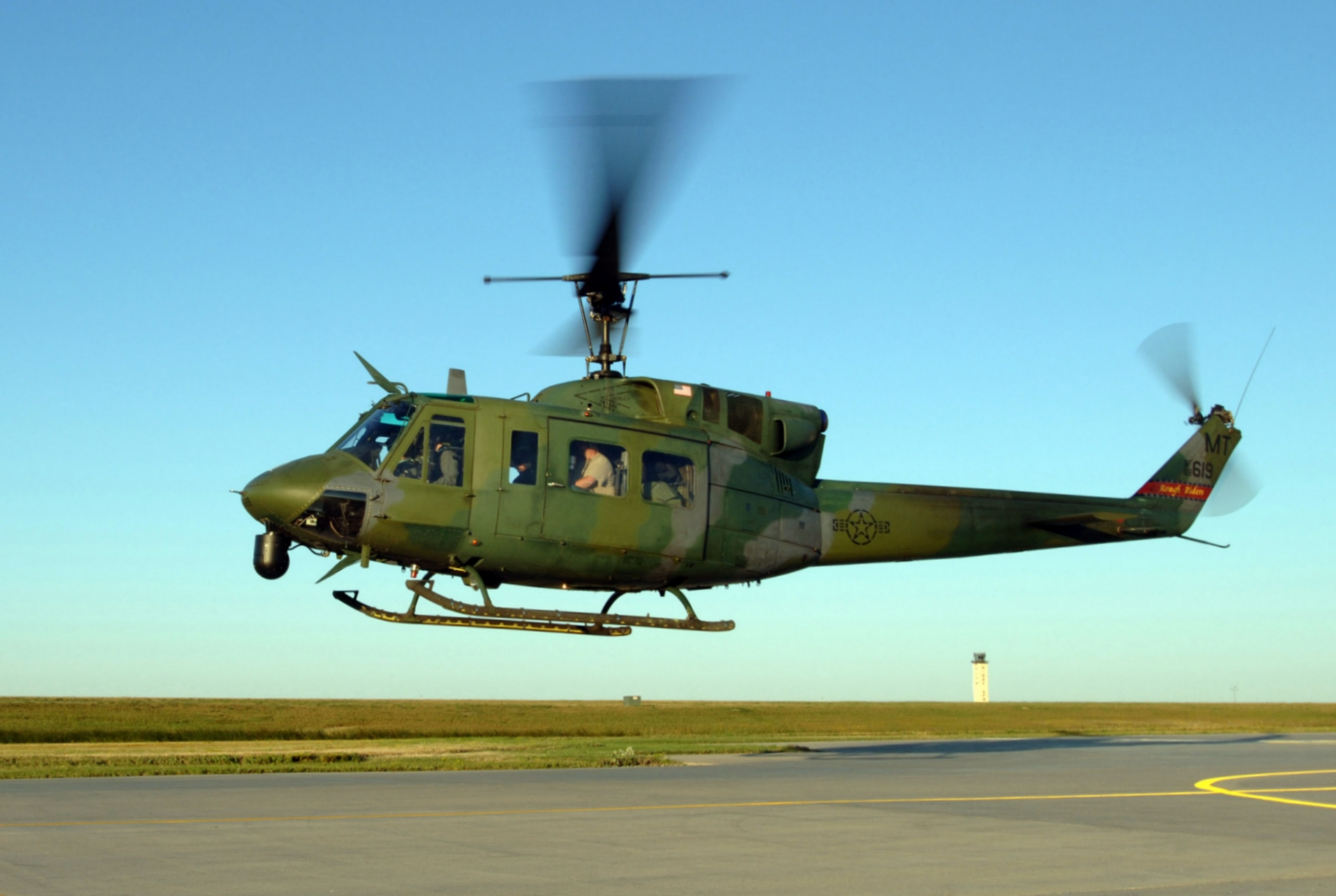
UH-1N helicopter at MAFB

Through its five squadrons, the group remains a key facet of The United States' deterrent force. The five squadrons assigned to the group are the:

- 740th Missile Squadron ("Vulgar Vultures")
- 741st Missile Squadron ("Gravelhaulers")
- 742d Missile Squadron ("Wolf Pack")
- 91st Operations Support Squadron
- 54th Helicopter Squadron

==== 91st Maintenance Group ====
The 91st Maintenance Group is the maintenance backbone of the 91st Missile Wing, originally activated as the 91st Maintenance and Supply Group on November 10, 1948. Today, the group is responsible for providing maintenance and logistics support for the wing's ICBM fleet. The two squadrons assigned to the group are:

- 91st Missile Maintenance Squadron
- 91st Maintenance Operations Squadron

==== 91st Security Forces Group ====
The 91st Security Forces Group provides command and control for four squadrons: the 91st Missile Security Forces Squadron, 791st Missile Security Forces Squadron, 891st Missile Security Forces Squadron, and 91st Security Support Squadron—for the active defense of assets vital to national security.

== Based units ==
Flying and notable non-flying units based at Minot Air Force Base.

Units marked GSU are Geographically Separate Units, which although based at Minot, are subordinate to a parent unit based at another location.

=== United States Air Force ===
Air Force Global Strike Command (AFGSC)

- Eighth Air Force
  - 5th Bomb Wing (Host)
    - 5th Operations Group
      - 5th Operations Support Squadron
      - 23rd Bomb Squadron – B-52H Stratofortress
      - 69th Bomb Squadron – B-52H Stratofortress
    - 5th Maintenance Group
      - 5th Aircraft Maintenance Squadron
      - 5th Maintenance Squadron
      - 5th Maintenance Operations Squadron
      - 5th Munitions Squadron
      - 705th Munitions Squadron
      - Quality Assurance
    - 5th Medical Group
      - 5th Medical Operations Squadron
      - 5th Medical Support Squadron
    - 5th Mission Support Group
      - 5th Civil Engineer Squadron
      - 5th Communications Squadron
      - 5th Contracting Squadron
      - 5th Force Support Squadron
      - 5th Logistics Readiness Squadron
      - 5th Security Forces Squadron
- Twentieth Air Force
  - 91st Missile Wing
    - 91st Operations Group
      - 91st Operations Support Squadron
      - 740th Missile Squadron – LGM-30G Minuteman-III
      - 741st Missile Squadron – LGM-30G Minuteman-III
      - 742nd Missile Squadron – LGM-30G Minuteman-III
    - 91st Maintenance Group
      - 91st Missile Maintenance Squadron
      - 791st Maintenance Squadron
    - 91st Security Forces Group
      - 91st Missile Security Forces Squadron
      - 91st Missile Security Operations Squadron
      - 791st Missile Security Forces Squadron
      - 891st Missile Security Forces Squadron
  - 582nd Helicopter Group
    - 54th Helicopter Squadron (GSU) – UH-1N Iroquois

Air National Guard

- North Dakota Air National Guard
  - 119th Wing
    - 119th Mission Support Group
      - 219th Security Forces Squadron (GSU)

== Geography ==
According to the United States Census Bureau, the Minot AFB CDP has a total area of 20 square kilometres (7.7 sq mi), of which, 19 square kilometres (7.4 sq mi) is land and 0.78 square kilometres (0.3 sq mi) (4.17%) is water.

Due to the winter conditions, a phrase spread within the USAF regarding why people would not wish to be stationed there: "Why not Minot? Freezin's the reason!" In response, people who loved Minot AFB, and the surrounding area, came up with the comeback "-41 Keeps the RIF-Raf out."

== Demographics ==
Historical population
Census	Pop.	Note	%±
1970	12,077		—
1980	9,880		−18.2%
1990	9,095		−7.9%
2000	7,599		−16.4%
2010	5,521		−27.3%
2020	5,017		−9.1%
source: 2020 Census

As of the census of 2000, there were 7,599 people, 2,112 households, and 1,943 families residing in the CDP. The population density was 1,053.9 people per square mile (406.9/km^{2}). There were 2,441 housing units at an average density of 338.5/sq mi (130.7/km^{2}). The racial makeup of the CDP was 79.1% White, 10.2% African American, 0.7% Native American, 2.8% Asian, 0.1% Pacific Islander, 2.8% from other races, and 4.2% from two or more races. Hispanic or Latino people of any race were 6.2% of the population.

There were 2,112 households, out of which 68.6% had children under the age of 18 living with them, 86.5% were married couples living together, 3.0% had a female householder with no husband present, and 8.0% were non-families. 6.6% of all households were made up of individuals, and none had someone living alone who was 65 years of age or older. The average household size was 3.25 and the average family size was 3.40.

In the CDP, the population was spread out, with 36.3% under the age of 18, 24.0% from 18 to 24, 38.1% from 25 to 44, 1.5% from 45 to 64, and 0.1% who were 65 years of age or older. The median age was 22 years. For every 100 females, there were 120.8 males. For every 100 females age 18 and over, there were 126.6 males.

The median income for a household in the CDP was $32,255, and the median income for a family was $32,306. Males had a median income of $22,458 versus $16,659 for females. The per capita income for the town was $11,629. About 5.0% of families and 5.2% of the population were below the poverty line, including 5.2% of those under age 18 and none of those age 65 or over.

== Public schools ==
For its dependents, the base has three schools operated by Minot Public Schools: two elementary (Dakota and North Plains) and a middle school (Memorial), built in the 1960s. High school students (grades 9–12) attend Minot North High School in the city of Minot, thirteen miles (21 km) south. MNHS recently opened in August 2024; base students previously attended Minot High School, which was split between two campuses: Central (1918, downtown) for freshmen and sophomores, and Magic City (1974, on the southwest side of the city) for juniors and seniors. Magic City is now Minot High School (9–12) and Central is the district's fourth middle school.

== See also ==
- United States general surveillance radar stations

== Other sources ==
- This article incorporates public domain material from the Air Force Historical Research Agency
- This article incorporates public domain material from Minot Air Force Base. United States Air Force.
- Maurer, Maurer. Air Force Combat Units of World War II. Washington, DC: U.S. Government Printing Office 1961 (republished 1983, Office of Air Force History, ISBN 0-912799-02-1).
- Ravenstein, Charles A. Air Force Combat Wings Lineage and Honors Histories 1947–1977. Maxwell Air Force Base, Alabama: Office of Air Force History 1984. ISBN 0-912799-12-9.
- Mueller, Robert, Air Force Bases Volume I, Active Air Force Bases Within the United States of America on 17 September 1982, Office of Air Force History, 1989
- A Handbook of Aerospace Defense Organization 1946 – 1980, by Lloyd H. Cornett and Mildred W. Johnson, Office of History, Aerospace Defense Center, Peterson Air Force Base, Colorado
- Winkler, David F. (1997), Searching the skies: the legacy of the United States Cold War defense radar program. Prepared for United States Air Force Headquarters Air Combat Command.
- Information for Minot AFB, ND
- Minot AFB history from Strategic-Air-Command.com
- Minot AFB at GlobalSecurity.org
