= 69th Bomb Squadron =

US Air Force unit

69th Bomb Squadron

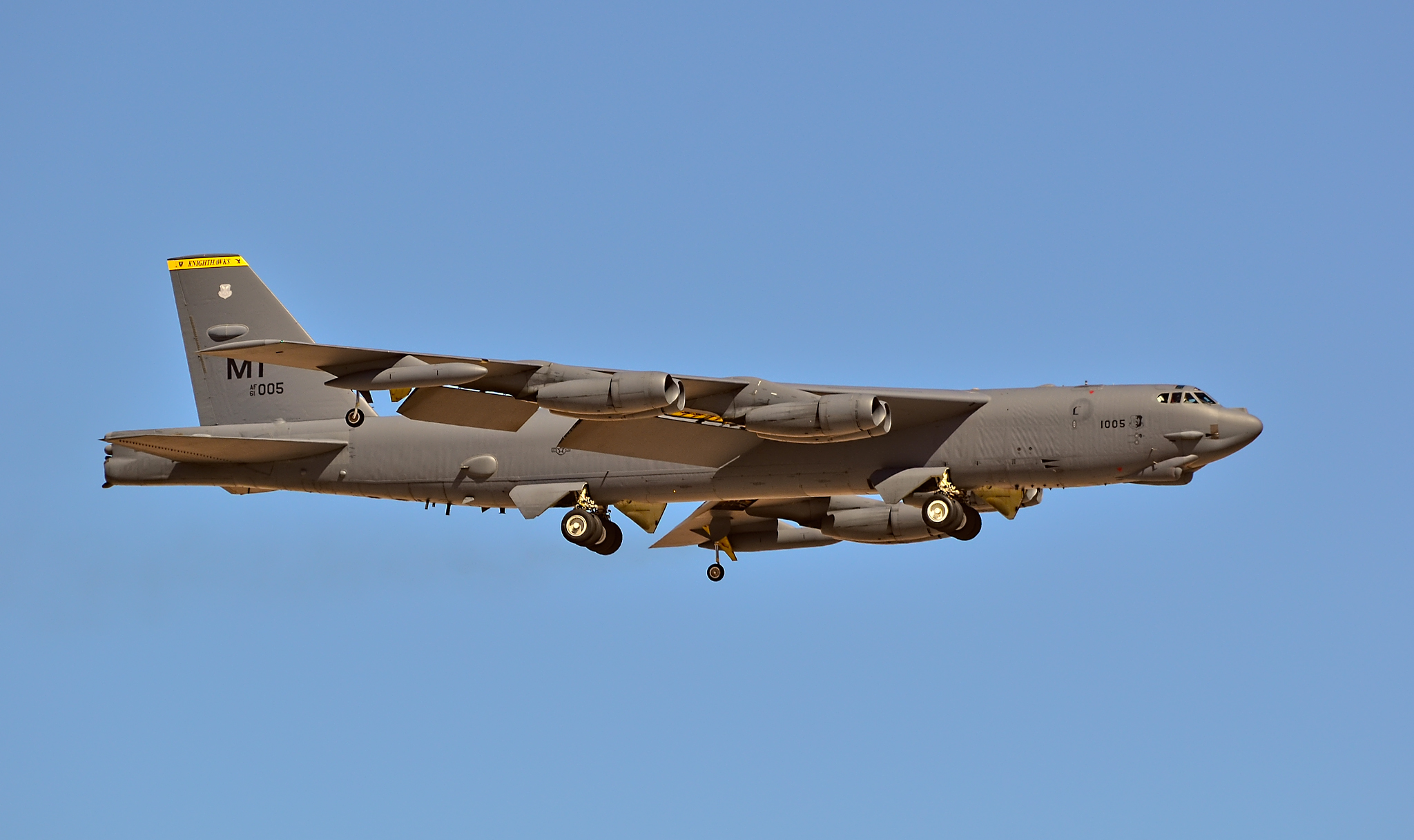
- Squadron B-52H Stratofortress
- Active: 1940–1946; 1953–1993; 2009–present
- Country: United States
- Branch: United States Air Force
- Type: Squadron
- Role: Strategic bomber
- Part of: Air Force Global Strike Command
- Garrison/HQ: Minot Air Force Base
- Nickname: Knighthawks
- Motto: We Make Knightmares
- Colors: Gray & Yellow
- Mascot: Nighthawk
- Engagements: Operation Inherent Resolve; Operation Freedom Sentinel; Southwest Pacific Theater
- Decorations: Presidential Unit Citation Meritorious Unit Award Air Force Outstanding Unit Award Philippine Presidential Unit Citation

Insignia
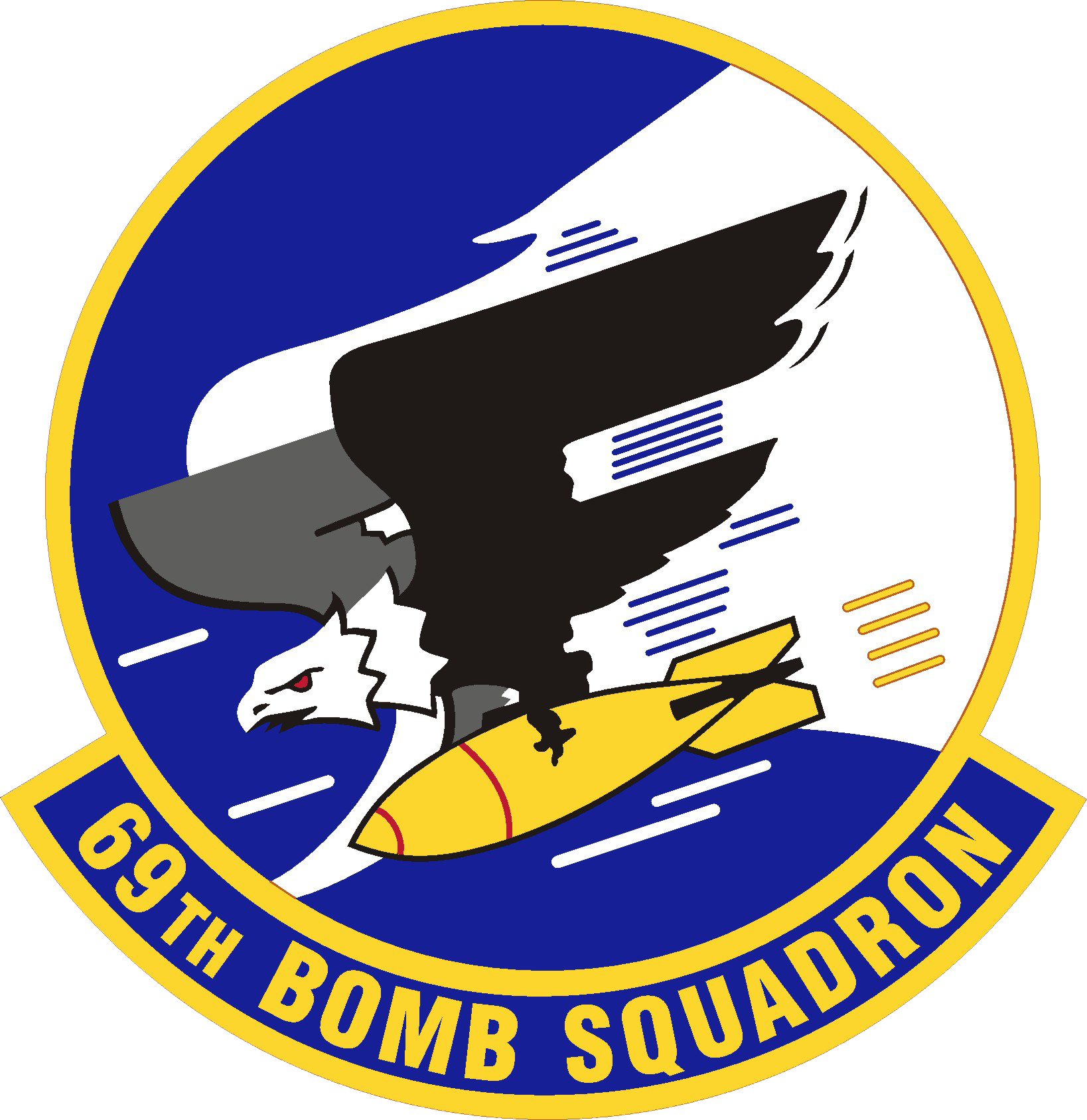
- 69th Bombardment Squadron emblem (Note: Approved 20 January 1945.)

Aircraft flown
- Bomber: B-52H Stratofortress

The 69th Bomb Squadron is an active United States Air Force unit. After being inactivated on 31 December 1993, it was reactivated on 3 September 2009 at Minot Air Force Base, and assigned to the 5th Bomb Wing. The squadron operates Boeing B-52H Stratofortress aircraft.

== History ==
=== World War II ===
==== Initial organization and training ====
The squadron was first activated on 15 January 1941 at Langley Field, Virginia as the 69th Bombardment Squadron, one of the three original bombardment squadrons of the 38th Bombardment Group. The squadron trained with Martin B-26 Marauders, but also flew Douglas B-18 Bolos. In June 1941, the squadron moved to Jackson Army Air Base, Mississippi.

Shortly after the attack on Pearl Harbor, on 19 January 1942, the ground echelon of the squadron departed for Australia. The air echelon remained at Jackson and continued training until May 1942, when it departed for the Southwest Pacific Theater, However, when the squadron reached the Hawaiian Islands, it was detained there and participated in the defense of Midway Island. Although it was not formally reassigned from the 38th Group until 1943, it was no longer under the control of the 38th from this time.

==== Combat in the Pacific ====
The squadron attacked enemy forces in the Philippines during early 1945 as part of the liberation from Japanese control, and continued combat missions until the Japanese capitulation in August 1945. It became part of the Fifth Air Force forces in Occupied Japan in 1946 before being inactivated in May 1946.

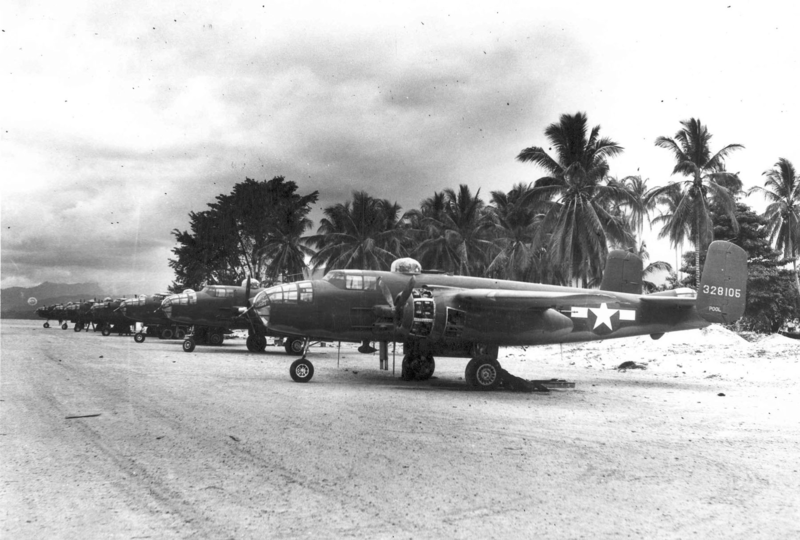
B-25 Mitchell's assigned to the squadron in Cape Sansapor, New Guinea, Sep 1944-Feb 1945

The 69th was awarded a Distinguished Unit Citation for its pre-invasion bombing of Balikpapan between 23 and 30 June 1945. Balikpapan was a center for oil refining on Borneo held by the Japanese. These attacks included bombing and strafing enemy shore installations. The round trip to the target was over 1700 miles and was among the longest flown by medium bombers during the war. Pre-mission experiments determined that the squadron's bombers could carry a bomb load over this distance with fuel tanks installed in their radio compartments despite having to take off from a runway damaged by enemy action. Four of the missions encountered severe tropical weather fronts. Despite intense and accurate flak, the squadron destroyed gun positions, warehouses, roadblocks, fuel and ammunition dumps, a radar station as well as huge stores of gasoline and oil which the enemy had placed in a position to be released into shallow pits oil the beach and ignited when the Australian ground troops made their assaults. The group attacked the beach while naval underwater demolition teams operated offshore without losing a man. The attacks were so effective that the Australian Seventh Division was able to come ashore without enemy opposition.

=== Cold War ===
The 69th was reactivated as a Strategic Air Command Convair B-36 Peacemaker bombardment squadron in 1953. Engaged in worldwide training missions with the B-36 until 1956 when re-equipped with the jet Boeing B-52 Stratofortress. The 69th was part of the 42nd Bomb Wing at Loring AFB, ME. The 69th was part of Strategic Air Command alert force.

On 16 September 1958, a B-52D (serial number 55-65) assigned to the squadron crashed in the vicinity of St Paul, Minnesota, while transiting en route on a continental United States (CONUS) training mission. The cause of the crash was believed to be a separation of flight controls that led to the tail separating from the aircraft. Of the eight crewmembers involved, only the copilot survived while several civilians were injured. A plaque was erected at the site of the crash in Inver Grove Heights, Minnesota.

During the Vietnam War the squadron deployed personnel and aircraft to Andersen Air Force Base, Guam and U-Tapao Royal Thai Navy Airfield, Thailand, for Operation Arc Light missions from 1968 to 1975. Crews maintained nuclear alert until the end of the Cold War.

In Oct 1988, the 69th became a conventional-munitions only B-52G squadron. The squadron tasking included conventional bombing, Harpoon Missiles for anti-shipping capabilities, and Naval mine-laying. The 69th was the first B-52 squadron to deploy in support of Desert Shield and Desert Storm. The 69th was the bombing element of the 4300 Provisional Bomb Wing located at Diego Garcia British Indian Ocean Territory (BIOT).

The last B-52G departed Loring Air Force Base on 18 Nov 1993 and base closed on 30 September 1994. Inactivated on 31 Dec 1993 with the drawdown of US Strategic forces.

=== Post-Cold War ===
The 69th was reactivated as Minot Air Force Base's second B-52H squadron on 3 September 2009 as part of Air Combat Command and transitioned to Air Force Global Strike Command in early 2010.

November 2010 saw the squadron deploy six B-52H Stratofortresses to Andersen Air Force Base, Guam for the first time since the Vietnam War as part of U.S. Pacific Command's continuous bomber presence.

On 5 June 2015, the 69th deployed three B-52H Stratofortress bombers to RAF Fairford for two weeks for exercises BALTOPS 15 and Saber Strike 15 taking place in Europe.

Four B-52H Stratofortress bombers from the 69th Bomb Squadron were flown to Nellis Air Force Base to participate in exercise Red Flag 15–3, which took place 13–31 July 2015.

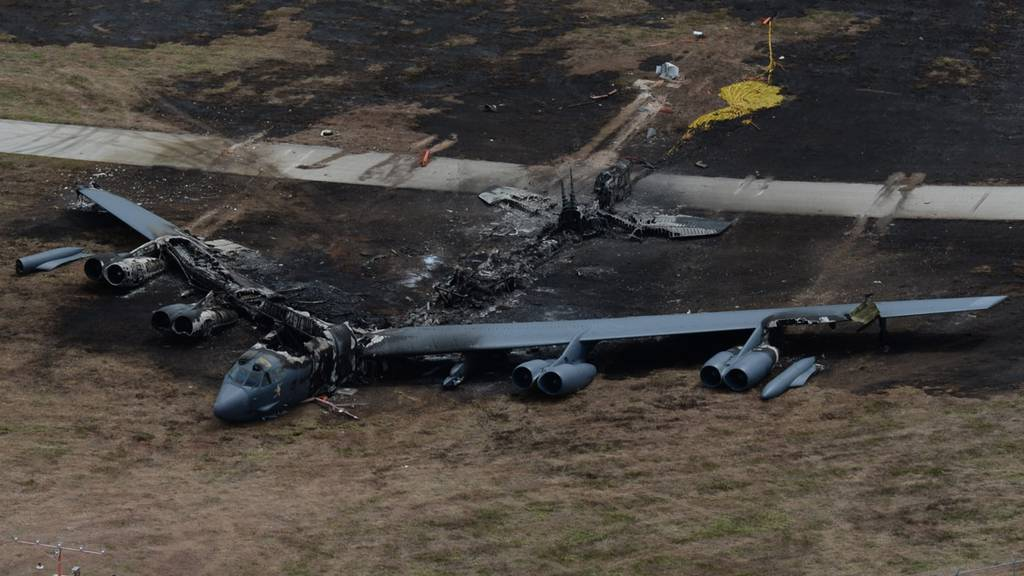
B-52 crashed on a heavyweight takeoff after aborting at high speed due to all right side engines failing after a perceived bird strike. All crew members survived.

On 19 May 2016 at 08:32 local time, a B-52H Stratofortress serial number 60-47 "Neanderthaul", crashed on takeoff at Andersen Air Force Base in Guam. The aircraft was assigned to the 69th Expeditionary Bomb Squadron, which was deployed to Andersen as part of the United States' Indo-Pacific Command's continuous bomber presence. The aircraft was carrying inert (training) weapons. The pilots observed birds on takeoff and saw all right-side engines failing at a critical phase during the takeoff. The pilot commanded to abort the takeoff but there was not enough runway remaining to safely stop, leading to the aircraft departing the runway. The main landing gear collapsed and the aircraft drag chute, which is used to slow the aircraft down during landing procedures, failed to deploy fully during the aborted takeoff and the aircraft came to rest 300 ft off the end of Runway 06L, short of the cliffs that dropped in the Pacific Ocean. All seven crew escaped safely, with one crew member sustaining minor injuries. An accident investigation board found no fault on the crews and in fact several crewmembers were awarded medals for their quick thinking and skill in ensuring no loss of life in the accident.

During Global Strike Challenge 2017 the squadron won both the LeMay Trophy, for the best in bomber operations, and the Linebacker Trophy, for the best B-52 squadron.

In February 2018 a B-52H from the 69th that was stationed Al Udeid Air Base set a new world record by dropping 24 precision-guided bombs on Taliban targets, beating the previous record of 19 (also held by a B52H). Codename name for the mission was "Operation Jagged Knife", part of a larger effort to target Taliban drug and financial infrastructure.

In July 2019, the 69th Bomb Squadron deployed to Anderson Air Force Base, Guam, in support of the continuous bomber presence mission directed by the United States Indo-Pacific Command. On 13 August 2019, a B-52H assigned to the 69th Expeditionary Bomb Squadron temporarily based at Andersen assisted in the search for the Indonesian-flagged fishing vessel KM Aleluya. Adrift for 10 days without food, water or electricity, the crew was safely rescued by the AMVER vessel Isl Star, approximately 172 miles northwest of Palau. The deployment would be extended from 6 months to 9 months due to the COVID-19 pandemic, resulting in the longest and final CBP deployment in USINDOPACOM history.

In July 2021, the 69th deployed on short notice back to Anderson in support of an international exercise with Australia and other Pacific partners.

On 19 April 2022, the 69th returned from a deployment to RAF Fairford, England, where they supported multiple NATO exercises amid the Russian invasion of Ukraine.

In July 2022, the 69th participated in Exercise Red Flag 22–3 as a standoff and precision-guided weapon delivery platform with an emphasis on developing tactics, techniques, and procedures for contested environments that mimic the rapidly changing global environment.

== Lineage ==
- Constituted as the 69th Bombardment Squadron (Medium) on 20 November 1940
  - Activated on 15 January 1941
  - Redesignated 69th Bombardment Squadron, Medium on 19 September 1944
  - Inactivated on 10 May 1946
- Redesignated 69th Bombardment Squadron, Heavy on 19 February 1953
  - Activated on 25 February 1953
  - Redesignated 69th Bomb Squadron on 1 September 1991
  - Inactivated on 31 December 1993
- Activated on 3 September 2009

=== Assignments ===
- 38th Bombardment Group, 15 January 1941
- 42d Bombardment Group, 26 February 1943 – 10 May 1946
- 42d Bombardment Wing, 25 February 1953
- 42d Operations Group, 1 September 1991 – 31 December 1993
- 5th Operations Group, 3 September 2009 – present

=== Stations ===
- Langley Field, Virginia, 15 January 1941
- Jackson Army Air Base, Mississippi, c. 5 June 1941 – 19 January 1942
- Doomben Airfield, Australia, 25 February 1942 (air echelon remained in US until 22 May 1942)
- Ballarat Airport, Australia, 8 March 1942
- Amberley Field, Australia, 30 April 1942
- New Caledonia, 20 May 1942 (air echelon at Hickam Field, Hawaii, 22 May – c. 18 June 1942 )
- New Hebrides, 7 December 1942
- Guadalcanal, Solomon Islands, 9 February 1943
- New Caledonia, July 1943 (air echelon operated from Guadalcanal, Solomon Islands until 20 October 1943)
- Russell Islands, Solomon Islands, 10 November 1943
- Stirling Island, Solomon Islands, 19 February 1944
- Hollandia Airfield Complex, New Guinea, 23 August 1944
- Sansapor Airfield, New Guinea, 14 September 1944 (air echelon operated from Morotai, 23 February – c. 22 March 1945)
- Puerto Princesa Airfield, Palawan, Philippines, 15 March 1945
- Itami Air Base, Japan, 31 January – 10 May 1946
- Limestone Air Force Base (later Loring Air Force Base), Maine, 25 February 1953 – 1 September 1991
- Minot Air Force Base, North Dakota 3 September 2009 – present

=== Aircraft ===
- Douglas B-18 Bolo, (1941)
- Martin B-26 Marauder, (1941–1943)
- North American B-25 Mitchell, (1942–1946)
- Convair B-36 Peacemaker, (1953–1956)
- Boeing B-52C Stratofortress (1956)
- Boeing B-52D Stratofortress (1957–1959)
- Boeing B-52G Stratofortress (1959–1993)
- Boeing B-52H Stratofortress (2009–present)

== Decorations ==
- Distinguished Unit Citation (now Presidential Unit Citation): Balikpapan, Borneo, 23-30 Jun 1945
- Meritorious Unit Citation: 6 Aug 2017-1 Apr 2018, 1 Jan-30 Dec 2021, 1 Jan-30 Dec 2022
- Air Force Outstanding Unit Awards: 1 Jul 1974-30 Jun 1975; 1 Jul 1982-30 Jun 1984; 1 Jul 1986-30 Jun 1988; 1 Jan 1992-31 Dec 1993 1 Jan 2011-31 Dec 2012
- Philippine Presidential Unit Citation: 7 Dec 1941-10 May 1942, 17 Oct 1944-4 Jul 1945.

== See also ==
- United States Army Air Forces in Australia
- USAAF in the Battle of Midway
- List of B-52 Units of the United States Air Force
