= 723d Tactical Fighter Squadron =

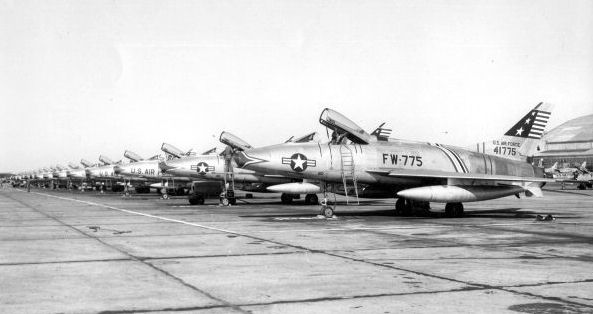
- 450th Fighter-Day Wing F-100 Super Sabres at Foster AFB
- Active: 1943-1945; 1954-1958
- Country: United States
- Branch: United States Air Force
- Role: Tactical fighter
- Engagements: Mediterranean Theater of Operations
- Decorations: Distinguished Unit Citation

Insignia
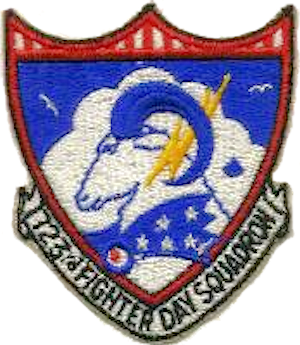
- Patch with 723d Tactical Fighter Squadron emblem (Note: Approved 6 June 1955. Description: On a shield of sky blue with a white cloud formation, and two birds volant, over all in the foreground a ram proper, couped at the shoulders, and issuing from the base of the shield, his horns shaded blue; a golden yellow lightning flash, placed over the cloud and the ram's shoulder, and over all in base, a badge of red and white, around the shield a red border, the border forming a stylized pattern on the shield's upper edge.)

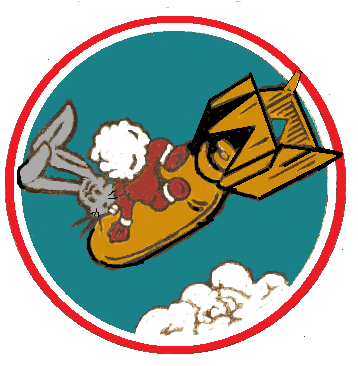
- 723d Bombardment Squadron emblem (World War II

The 723d Tactical Fighter Squadron is an inactive United States Air Force unit. It was last assigned to the 450th Tactical Fighter Wing at Foster Air Force Base, Texas, where it was inactivated on 18 December 1958.

The squadron was first activated as the 723d Bombardment Squadron in 1943. After training with Consolidated B-24 Liberators in the United States, it deployed to the Mediterranean Theater of Operations, where it participated in the strategic bombing campaign against Germany, earning two Distinguished Unit Citations. After V-E Day, the squadron returned to the United States and was inactivated when the 450th Group began to convert to the Boeing B-29 Superfortress..

The squadron was reactivated in 1954 as the 723d Fighter-Bomber Squadron at Foster, where it was initially equipped with North American F-86 Sabres. The following year, it became one of the first units to equip with the North American F-100 Super Sabre. It continued to fly the "Hun" until it was inactivated when Foster closed.

== History ==
=== World War II ===
==== Training in the United States ====
The squadron was first activated as the 723d Bombardment Squadron at Gowen Field, Idaho on 1 May 1943 as one of the four original squadrons of the 450th Bombardment Group. It soon moved to Clovis Army Air Field, New Mexico, where it was manned, drawing its cadre from the 302d Bombardment Group. and began to train with Consolidated B-24 Liberators. A cadre of the squadron was sent to the Army Air Forces School of Applied Tactics in June, where it received advanced heavy bomber tactical training. In November 1943, the 723d began moving overseas. The ground echelon proceeded to the port of embarkation at Camp Patrick Henry, sailing on the SS Bemjamin R. Milam, (Note: The squadron ground echelon history refers to this ship as the Benjamin "S." Milam. "History, 723d Bombardment Squadron Ground Echelon". 450th Bomb Group Memorial Association. 10 February 1944..) while the aircrews staged at Herington Army Air Field, Kansas, and ferried their planes to the Mediterranean Theater of Operations via the South Atlantic Ferry Route.

==== Combat operations ====
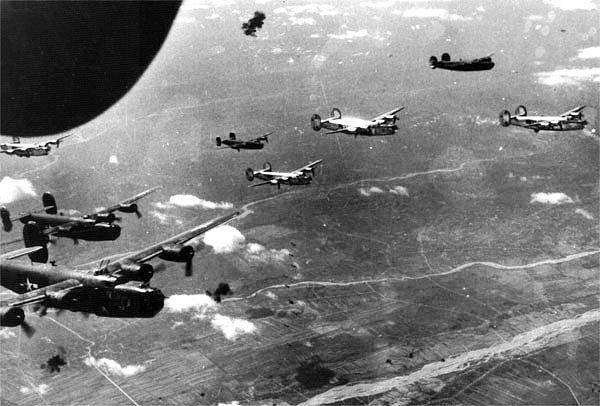
Formation of 450th Bomb Group B-24s flying through flak

The squadron arrived at its combat station, Manduria Airfield, Italy, in early January 1944 and began engaging in the strategic bombing campaign against Germany, primarily striking targets in Austria, Czechoslovakia, France, Germany, Hungary, Italy, and the Balkans. The squadron's first mission was flown against Mostar Airfield, Yugoslavia on 8 January. Targets included aircraft factories and assembly plants, oil refineries, marshalling yards, airfields and storage areas. Shortly after arriving in theater, the squadron participated in Big Week, the Eighth Air Force's concentrated attacks on the German aircraft industry, striking aircraft factories at Regensburg, Germany and Steyr, Austria. It was awarded a Distinguished Unit Citation (DUC) for its attack on the Messerschmitt factory at Regensburg on 25 February, despite bad weather, heavy flak in the target area and enroute attacks by enemy interceptor aircraft. The 450th Group led the 47th Bombardment Wing on the attack. The 723d earned a second DUC for an attack on rail yards near Ploesti on 5 April, when it fought its way through "relentless" attacks by enemy aircraft to reach the target. The rail yards were a vital link in the transportation of petroleum products from the Ploesti refineries to the eastern front. The 450th Group again led the 47th Wing on this mission.

During the spring of 1944, the squadron flew missions for Operation Strangle, the effort to choke off supplies for Axis military in Italy through air interdiction. The squadron also supported Operation Dragoon, the invasion of southern France in September 1944 by attacking troop concentrations, lines of communications and enemy coastal defenses. In addition, it conducted missions to support the Red Army advance through the Balkans and Allied advances in Italy.

The squadron returned to the United States in May 1945, assembling at Sioux Falls Army Air Field, South Dakota at the end of the month. The 450th Group was converted to a Boeing B-29 Superfortress unit, and the squadron was inactivated in June because very heavy bomber units in the Army Air Forces were formed with only three squadrons, not the four squadrons of heavy bomber groups.

=== Fighter operations ===
The squadron was redesignated the 723d Fighter-Bomber Squadron and activated at Foster Air Force Base, Texas in July 1954 under Tactical Air Command. The squadron initially flew North American F-86 Sabre fighters, but soon converted to the North American F-100 Super Sabre. In March 1955, the squadron was renamed the 723d Fighter-Day Squadron to reflect the F-100's air superiority capabilities. In July, the squadron's parent 450th Fighter-Day Wing became the first wing to equip with the improved F-100C model of the "Hun." In November 1957, the 450th Wing converted to the dual deputy organization. The 450th Fighter-Day Group was inactivated, and the squadron was assigned directly to the wing, reporting to a deputy commander for operations. Starting in July 1958, the squadron began to phase down in anticipation of its inactivation and the closure of Foster. It was inactivated on 18 December 1958.

== Lineage ==
- Constituted as the 723d Bombardment Squadron (Heavy) on 6 April 1943

Activated on 1 May 1943
Redesignated 723d Bombardment Squadron, Heavy c. 1944
Inactivated on 11 June 1945

- Redesignated 723d Fighter-Bomber Squadron on 31 March 1954

Activated on 1 July 1954
Redesignated: 723d Fighter-Day Squadron on 8 March 1955
Redesignated: 723d Tactical Fighter Squadron on 1 July 1958
Inactivated on 18 December 1958

=== Assignments ===
- 450th Bombardment Group, 1 May 1943 – 11 June 1945
- 450th Fighter-Bomber Group (later 450th Fighter-Day Group), 1 July 1954
- 450th Fighter-Day Wing (later 450th Tactical Fighter Wing), 11 December 1957 – 18 December 1958

=== Stations ===
- Gowen Field, Idaho, 1 May 1943
- Clovis Army Air Field, New Mexico, 21 May 1943
- Alamogordo Army Air Field, New Mexico, c. 8 July – 26 November 1943
- Manduria Airfield, Italy, c. 3 January 1944 – 16 May 1945
- Sioux Falls Army Air Field, South Dakota, c. 31 May 1945 – 11 June 1945
- Foster Air Force Base, Texas 1 July 1954 – 18 December 1958

=== Aircraft ===
- Consolidated B-24 Liberator, 1943–1945
- North American F-86 Sabre, 1954–1955
- North American F-100 Super Sabre, 1955–1958

=== Awards and campaigns ===
Award streamer	Award	Dates	Notes
	Distinguished Unit Citation	25 February 1944	Regensburg, Germany 723d Bombardment Squadron
	Distinguished Unit Citation	5 April 1944	Ploesti, Rumania 723d Bombardment Squadron

Campaign Streamer	Campaign	Dates	Notes
	Air Offensive, Europe	2 January 1944 – 5 June 1944	723d Bombardment Squadron
	Naples-Foggia	2 January 1944 – 21 January 1944	723d Bombardment Squadron
	Air Combat, EAME Theater	2 January 1944 – 11 May 1945	723d Bombardment Squadron
	Rome-Arno	22 January 1944 – 9 September 1944	723d Bombardment Squadron
	Central Europe	22 March 1944 – 21 May 1945	723d Bombardment Squadron
	Normandy	6 June 1944 – 24 July 1944	723d Bombardment Squadron
	Northern France	25 July 1944 – 14 September 1944	723d Bombardment Squadron
	Southern France	15 August 1944 – 14 September 1944	723d Bombardment Squadron
	North Apennines	10 September 1944 – 4 April 1945	723d Bombardment Squadron
	Rhineland	15 September 1944 – 21 March 1945	723d Bombardment Squadron
	Po Valley	3 April 1945 – 8 May 1945	723d Bombardment Squadron

== See also ==
- List of F-100 units of the United States Air Force
- List of F-86 Sabre units
- B-24 Liberator units of the United States Army Air Forces
