= 720th Bombardment Squadron =

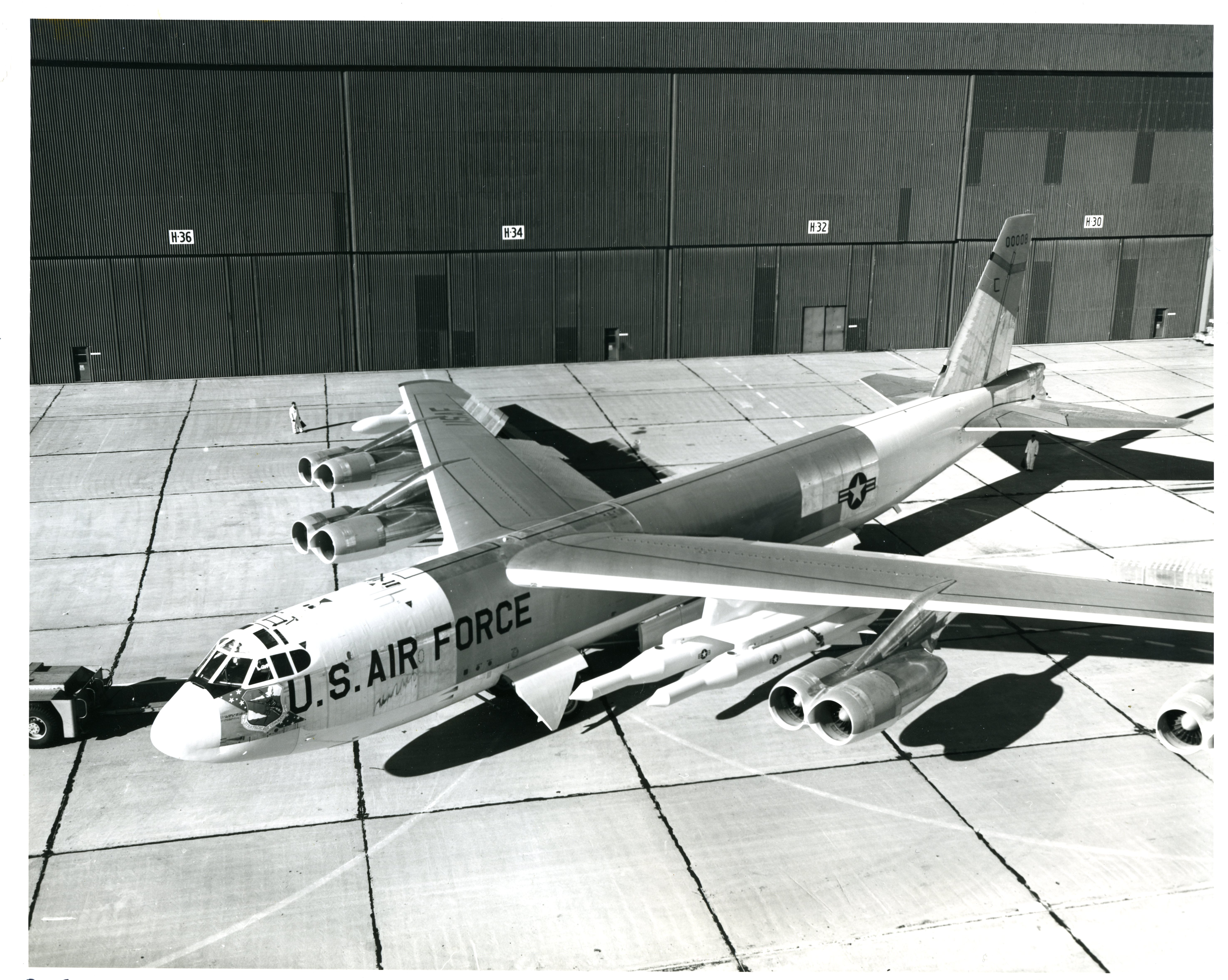
- Uncamouflaged B-52H as flown by the squadron
- Active: 1943–1945; 1953–1955; 1957–1958; 1963–1968
- Country: United States
- Branch: United States Air Force
- Role: Heavy bomber
- Engagements: Mediterranean Theater of Operations
- Decorations: Distinguished Unit Citation

Insignia
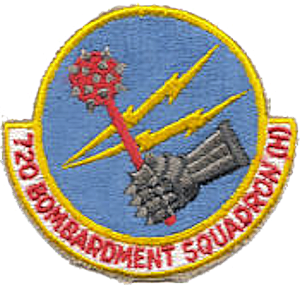
- Patch with 720th Bombardment Squadron emblem (Note: Approved 11 August 1954. Description: On a light blue disc, a steel gauntlet holding a red mace with steel spikes, behind the shaft of the mace two double ended lightning bolts of golden yellow converging to the left.)

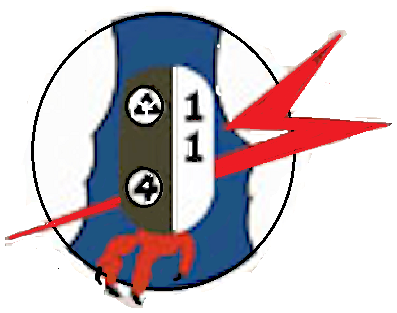
- 720th Bombardment Squadron emblem (World War II)

The 720th Bombardment Squadron is an inactive United States Air Force unit. It was last assigned to the 450th Bombardment Wing at Minot Air Force Base, North Dakota, where it was inactivated on 25 July 1968.

The squadron was first activated in 1943. After training with Consolidated B-24 Liberators in the United States, it deployed to the Mediterranean Theater of Operations, where it participated in the strategic bombing campaign against Germany, earning two Distinguished Unit Citations. After V-E Day, the squadron returned to the United States and was inactivated.

During the 1950s, the squadron was twice activated as a fighter unit, in Alaska and in Texas. It returned to its bomber designation and was activated with Boeing B-52H Stratofortresses at Minot in 1963.

== History ==
=== World War II ===
==== Training in the United States ====
The 720th Bombardment Squadron was first activated at Gowen Field, Idaho on 1 May 1943 as one of the four original squadrons of the 450th Bombardment Group. It soon moved to Clovis Army Air Field, New Mexico, where it was manned, drawing its cadre from the 355th Bombardment Squadron. and began to train with Consolidated B-24 Liberators. A cadre of the squadron was sent to the Army Air Forces School of Applied Tactics in June, where they received advanced heavy bomber tactical training. In November 1943, the 720th began moving overseas. The ground echelon proceeded to the port of embarkation at Camp Patrick Henry, sailing on the SS Henry Baldwin, while the aircrews staged at Herington Army Air Field, Kansas, and ferried their planes to the Mediterranean Theater of Operations via the South Atlantic Ferry Route.

==== Combat operations ====
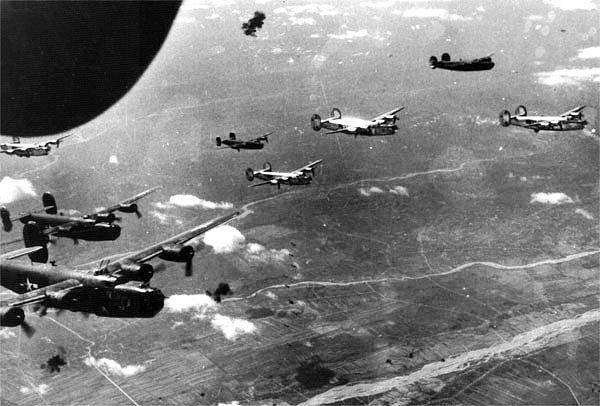
Formation of 450th Bomb Group B-24s flying through flak

The squadron arrived at its combat station, Manduria Airfield, Italy, in early January 1944 and began engaging in the strategic bombing campaign against Germany, primarily striking targets in Austria, Czechoslovakia, France, Germany, Hungary, Italy, and the Balkans. The first mission was flown against harbor installations at Zadar, Yugoslavia on 9 January. Targets included aircraft factories and assembly plants, oil refineries, marshalling yards, airfields and storage areas. On one of the squadron's early missions, an attack on an enemy airfield at Udine, Italy on 30 January, the squadron commander, Capt Clark J. Wicks, was fatally wounded. Shortly after arriving in theater, the squadron participated in Big Week, attacking aircraft factories at Regensburg, Germany and Steyr, Austria. It was awarded a Distinguished Unit Citation (DUC) for its attack on the Messerschmitt factory at Regensburg on 25 February, despite bad weather, heavy flak in the target area and enroute attacks by enemy interceptor aircraft. The 450th Group led the 47th Bombardment Wing on the attack. The 720th earned a second DUC for an attack on rail yards near Ploesti on 5 April, when it fought its way through "relentless" attacks by enemy aircraft to reach the target. The rail yards were a vital link in the transportation of petroleum products from the Ploesti refineries to the eastern front. The squadron led the 47th Wing on this mission. Initial attacks by Messerschmitt Bf 109s on the lead element destroyed three B-24s. The squadron claimed eight enemy aircraft destroyed and three more probably destroyed on this mission. (Note: Initial claims by the 450th Group were of 27 German aircraft destroyed. 720th Bomb Squadron 1943-1945, p. 126.)

During the spring of 1944, the squadron flew missions for Operation Strangle, the effort to choke off supplies for Axis military in Italy through air interdiction. The squadron also supported Operation Dragoon, the invasion of southern France in September 1944 by attacking troop concentrations, lines of communications and enemy coastal defenses. It also conducted missions to support the Red Army advance through the Balkans and Allied advances in Italy.

The squadron returned to the United States in May 1945, assembling at Sioux Falls Army Air Field, South Dakota at the end of the month. It moved to Harvard Army Air Field, Nebraska in July and trained with the Boeing B-29 Superfortress, however after V-J Day in August the squadron inactivated on 15 October.

=== Fighter operations ===
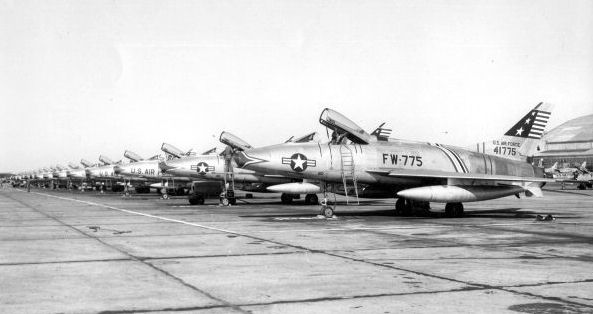
450th Fighter-Day Wing F-100s at Foster AFB (Note: Aircraft in foregound is North American F-100C-5-NA Super Sabre, serial 54-1775. This airplane was shot down on 2 August 1968. Baugher, Joe (4 May 2023). "1954 USAF Serial Numbers". Joe Baugher.)

The squadron was redesignated the 720th Fighter-Bomber Squadron and activated at Ladd Air Force Base, Alaska in December 1953. The squadron was equipped with North American F-86 Sabres. In May 1954, the 720th moved to Eielson Air Force Base, Alaska. At Eielson, it formed an aerial demonstration team named the Arctic Gladiators. The team's four Sabres performed demonstrations in Alaska. The squadron was inactivated on 8 August 1955 and its mission, personnel and equipment were transferred to the 455th Fighter-Bomber Squadron, which was simultaneously activated.

In the late fall of 1957, the 450th Fighter-Day Wing at Foster Air Force Base, Texas underwent a major reorganization. In November, the 322d Fighter-Day Group, which was attached to the wing, and its three squadrons were inactivated. The following month, the squadron, redesignated the 720th Fighter-Day Squadron, was activated as the fourth squadron of the 450th Wing and equipped with North American F-100 Super Sabres. However, Tactical Air Command closed Foster a year later and the squadron was inactivated in November 1958.

=== Strategic Air Command ===
In February 1963, The 450th Bombardment Wing was organized at Minot Air Force Base, North Dakota, where it assumed the aircraft, personnel and equipment of the discontinued 4136th Strategic Wing. The 4136th was a Major Command controlled (MAJCON) wing, which could not carry a permanent history or lineage, and Strategic Air Command (SAC) wanted to replace it with a permanent unit. As part of this reorganization, the 720th was redesignated the 720th Bombardment Squadron, was activated, and assumed the mission, personnel and equipment of the 525th Bombardment Squadron, which was simultaneously inactivated.

One half of the squadron's Boeing B-52H Stratofortresses were maintained on fifteen minute alert, fully fueled and ready for combat to reduce vulnerability to a Soviet missile strike. In addition, the squadron trained for strategic bombardment missions. Beginning in June 1968, the squadron provided aircrews to support Operation Arc Light, SAC operations in Southeast Asia. In July 1968 when SAC ended its bomber operations at Travis Air Force Base, California, the 5th Bombardment Wing moved to Minot to replace the 450th Wing. In connection with this move, the personnel and equipment of the 720th were transferred to the 23d Bombardment Squadron, which moved on paper with the 5th Wing from Travis, and the 720th was inactivated.

== Lineage ==
- Constituted as the 720th Bombardment Squadron (Heavy) on 6 April 1943

Activated on 1 May 1943
Redesignated 720th Bombardment Squadron, Heavy c. 1944
Redesignated 720th Bombardment Squadron, Very Heavy on 23 May 1945
Inactivated on 15 October 1945

- Redesignated 720th Fighter-Bomber Squadron on 29 October 1953

Activated on 25 December 1953
Inactivated on 8 August 1955

- Redesignated 720th Fighter-Day Squadron on 13 November 1957

Activated on 11 December 1957
Redesignated 720th Tactical Fighter Squadron on 1 July 1958
Inactivated on 18 December 1958

- Redesignated 720th Bombardment Squadron, Heavy and activated on 15 November 1962 (not organized)

Organized on 1 February 1963
Inactivated on 25 July 1968

=== Assignments ===
- 450th Bombardment Group, 1 May 1943 – 15 October 1945
- 11th Air Division, 25 December 1953 – 8 August 1955
- 450th Fighter-Day Wing (later 450th Tactical Fighter Wing), 11 December 1957 – 18 December 1958
- Strategic Air Command, 15 November 1962 (not organized)
- 450th Bombardment Wing, 1 February 1963 – 25 July 1968

=== Stations ===
- Gowen Field, Idaho, 1 May 1943
- Clovis Army Air Field, New Mexico, 21 May 1943
- Alamogordo Army Air Field, New Mexico, c. 8 July–26 November 1943
- Manduria Airfield, Italy, 2 January 1944 – 13 May 1945
- Sioux Falls Army Air Field, South Dakota, c. 31 May 1945
- Harvard Army Air Field, Nebraska, 24 July–15 October 1945
- Ladd Air Force Base, Alaska, 25 December 1953
- Eielson Air Force Base, Alaska, 17 May 1954 – 8 August 1955
- Foster Air Force Base, Texas, 11 December 1957 – 18 December 1958
- Minot Air Force Base, North Dakota, 1 February 1963 – 25 July 1968

=== Aircraft ===
- Consolidated B-24 Liberator, 1943-1945
- Boeing B-29 Superfortress, 1945
- North American F-86 Sabre, 1954-1955
- North American F-100 Super Sabre, 1958
- Boeing B-52 Stratofortress, 1963-1968

=== Awards and campaigns ===
Award streamer	Award	Dates	Notes
	Distinguished Unit Citation	25 February 1944	Regensburg, Germany 720th Bombardment Squadron
	Distinguished Unit Citation	5 April 1944	Ploesti, Rumania 720th Bombardment Squadron

Campaign Streamer	Campaign	Dates	Notes
	Air Offensive, Europe	2 January 1944 – 5 June 1944	720th Bombardment Squadron
	Naples-Foggia	2 January 1944 – 21 January 1944	720th Bombardment Squadron
	Air Combat, EAME Theater	2 January 1944 – 11 May 1945	720th Bombardment Squadron
	Rome-Arno	22 January 1944 – 9 September 1944	720th Bombardment Squadron
	Central Europe	22 March 1944 – 21 May 1945	720th Bombardment Squadron
	Normandy	6 June 1944 – 24 July 1944	720th Bombardment Squadron
	Northern France	25 July 1944 – 14 September 1944	720th Bombardment Squadron
	Southern France	15 August 1944 – 14 September 1944	720th Bombardment Squadron
	North Apennines	10 September 1944 – 4 April 1945	720th Bombardment Squadron
	Rhineland	15 September 1944 – 21 March 1945	720th Bombardment Squadron
	Po Valley	3 April 1945 – 8 May 1945	720th Bombardment Squadron

== See also ==
- List of B-52 Units of the United States Air Force
- List of F-100 units of the United States Air Force
- List of F-86 Sabre units
- List of B-29 Superfortress operators
- B-24 Liberator units of the United States Army Air Forces
