= 7th Fighter Wing =

7th Fighter Wing may refer to:

- Jagdgeschwader 7, Germany
- fr:7e escadre de chasse (7th Fighter Wing), France

== United States Army Air Forces ==
- 47th Air Division, which was designated 7th Fighter Wing from June 1942 to February 1943
- 7th Air Division, which was designated 7th Fighter Wing from April 1944 to December 1947
