= 450th Bombardment Group =

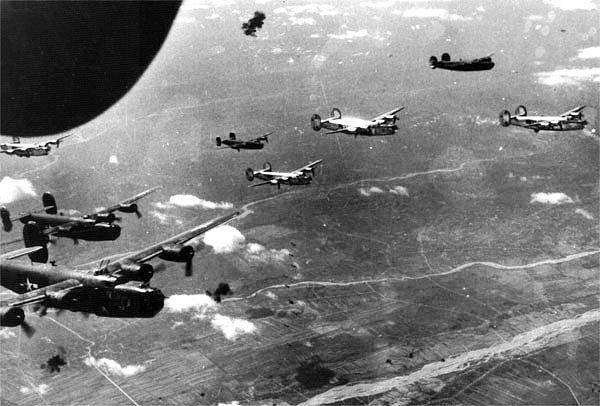
- B-24s of the 450th Bomb Group
- Active: 1943-1945, 1954-1957
- Country: United States
- Branch: United States Air Force
- Type: Bomber, then Fighter
- Engagements: Mediterranean Theater of Operations
- Decorations: Distinguished Unit Citation

Insignia
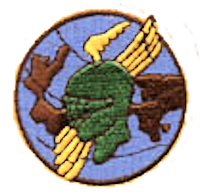
- 450th Bombardment Group Emblem

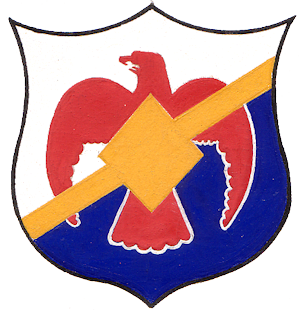
- 450th Fighter-Bomber Group Emblem

The 450th Fighter-Day Group is an inactive United States Air Force unit. It was last assigned to the 450th Fighter-Day Wing of Tactical Air Command (TAC) at Foster AFB, Texas. It was inactivated on 11 December 1957.

The 450th Bombardment Group was originally activated in 1943 and saw combat during World War II as a B-24 Liberator heavy bombardment group under Fifteenth Air Force in Italy. They were known as "The Cottontails" because the vertical stabilizers of the bombers were painted white. The unit received two Distinguished Unit Citations in support of the invasion of Southern France, the advance of Russian troops in the Balkans, and the Allied effort in Italy. It was inactivated in October 1945.

The group was reactivated as a fighter unit briefly in the 1950s under Tactical Air Command (TAC) at Foster AFB, Texas, where it replaced a flying training unit. It was the first USAF combat group to fly the North American F-100 Super Sabre.

== History ==
For additional and related history, see 450th Bombardment Wing

=== World War II ===
The 450th Bombardment Group (Heavy) was constituted on 6 April 1943 and activated on 1 May 1943 at Gowen Field, Idaho. The new group was moved without personnel or equipment to a temporary station at Clovis Army Air Field, New Mexico on 21 May 1943 where the command and headquarters of the group was assembled. On 5 July 1943, the group was reassigned to Alamogordo Army Airfield, which was to house the Group for all phases of training with their Consolidated B-24 Liberator bombers.

When the group was finally assembled for the first time at Alamogordo, many of the key positions in both the group and squadrons had been filled. Both officers and men arrived daily and little by little all sections were built up to full strength. Crews were allotted in groups of eight, twelve and forty-six bringing the strength finally on 24 August 1943 to seventy or full strength.

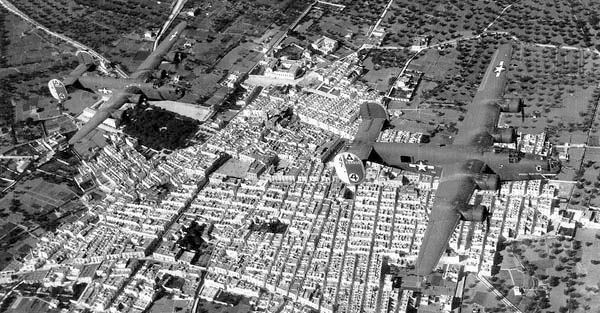
B-24s over Italy, 1944

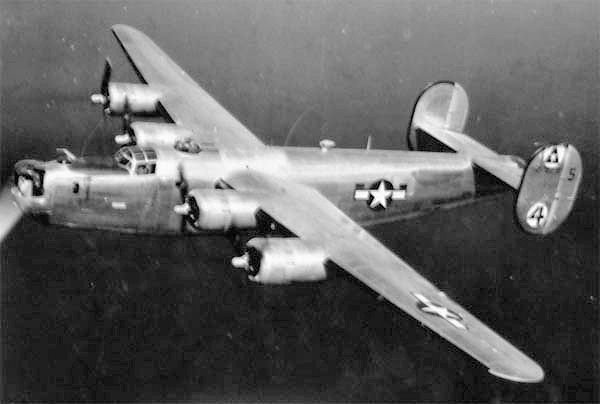
B-24 of the 450th Bomb Group

After training was completed, the 450th was reassigned to the Mediterranean Theater of Operations (MTO) in Southern Italy, arriving in December 1943. It began operations with Fifteenth Air Force in January 1944 and engaged chiefly in missions against strategic targets in Italy, France, Germany, Austria, Czechoslovakia, Hungary, and the Balkans until April 1945. The group bombed aircraft factories, assembly plants, oil refineries, storage areas, marshalling yards, airfields, and other objectives.

The 450th contributed to the intensive Allied campaign against the enemy aircraft industry during Big Week (20–25 February 1944) by attacking factories at Steyr and Regensburg, being awarded a Distinguished Unit Citation (DUC) for braving the hazards of bad weather, enemy fighters, and flak to bombard a Messerschmitt aircraft manufacturing factory at Regensburg on 25 February.

The group received a second DUC for a mission on 5 April 1944 when it fought its way through relentless attacks by enemy aircraft to bomb railroad marshalling yards at Ploiești, Romania. The group also struck such objectives as enemy defenses, troop concentrations, bridges, and marshalling yards in support of the Invasion of southern France. It operated from Poltava Airbase, near Kiev in the Soviet Union, to support the advance of Russian troops in the Balkans as part of Operation Frantic, and supporting the United States Fifth Army in the Allied effort in Italy.

The group redeployed to the United States during May. Many personnel were demobilized upon arrival at the port of debarkation; a small cadre of key personnel was formed and the group was then established at Harvard Army Air Field, Nebraska in July and the unit was redesignated the 450th Bombardment Group, Very Heavy in July and was equipped with Boeing B-29 Superfortresses and programmed for deployment to the Pacific Theater.

The Japanese Capitulation in August made the group redundant to Air Force requirements and the unit was demobilized, and the unit was inactivated on 15 October 1945.

=== Tactical Air Command ===
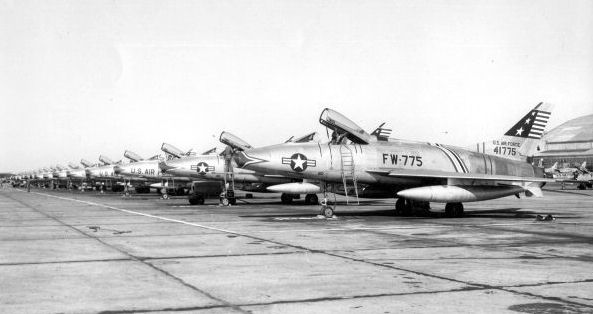
North American F-100s of the 450th Fighter-Day Group, about 1956. North American F-100C 54-1775 was lost in combat during the Vietnam War when assigned to the 37th Tactical Fighter Wing at Phu Cat Air Base on 2 August 1968, its pilot was recovered.

The group was reactivated at Foster AFB, Texas, on 1 July 1954, where it was assigned to the 450th Fighter-Bomber Wing of Tactical Air Command. Its operational squadrons were initially equipped with the North American F-86F Sabre. Its aircraft wore an approximation of the stars and stripes, with seven red and six white stripes on the trailing edge, and three stars in white on the blue forward portion of the fin. They also were designated with a colored, scalloped nose chevron.

In early 1955, the 450th began receiving new F-100C/D Super Sabre aircraft, replacing the older F-86s. It was the first operational TAC group to be equipped with the F-100. With the change of equipment, the group was redesignated as the 450th Fighter-Day Group on 8 March 1955. At the end of 1957, it was inactivated and its squadrons were assigned directly to the wing under the Dual Deputate organization.

== Lineage ==
- Constituted as 450th Bombardment Group (Heavy) on 6 April 1943

Activated on 1 May 1943
Redesignated 450th Bombardment Group, Very Heavy on 26 July 1945
Inactivated on 15 October 1945
Redesignated 450th Fighter-Bomber Group on 23 March 1953

- Activated on 1 July 1954

Redesignated 450th Fighter-Day Group on 8 March 1955
Inactivated on 11 December 1957
Redesignated 450th Bombardment Group, Heavy on 31 July 1985 (remained inactive)

=== Assignments ===
- II Bomber Command, 1 May 1943
- 47th Bombardment Wing, 20 December 1943 – 12 May 1945
- 20th Bombardment Wing, c. 26 July – 15 October 1945
- 450th Fighter-Bomber Wing (later Fighter-Day Wing), 1 July 1954 –11 December 1957

=== Stations ===
- Gowen Field, Idaho, 1 May 1943
- Clovis AAF, New Mexico, c. 21 May 1943
- Alamogordo AAF, New Mexico, c. 8 July – 20 November 1943
- Manduria Airfield, Italy, 20 December 1943 – 12 May 1945
- Harvard AAF, Nebraska, c. 26 July – 15 October 1945.
- Foster AFB, Texas 1 July 1954 – 11 December 1957

=== Components ===
- 720th Bombardment Squadron (later Fighter-Bomber Squadron, Fighter-Day Squadron): 1 May 1943 – 15 October 1945; 1 July 1954 – 8 August 1955; 1 July 1958 – 11 December 1957
- 721st Bombardment Squadron (later Fighter-Bomber Squadron, Fighter-Day Squadron): 1 May 1943 – 15 October 1945; 1 July 1954 – 11 December 1957
- 722d Bombardment Squadron (later Fighter-Bomber Squadron, Fighter-Day Squadron): 1 May 1943 – 15 October 1945; 1 July 1954 – 11 December 1957
- 723d Bombardment Squadron (later Fighter-Bomber Squadron, Fighter-Day Squadron): 1 May 1943 – 15 October 1945; 1 July 1954 – 11 December 1957

=== Aircraft ===
- B-24 Liberator (1943–1945)
- B-29 Superfortress (1945)
- F-86 Sabre, 1954–1955
- F-100 Super Sabre, 1955–1957
