= 450th Bombardment Wing =

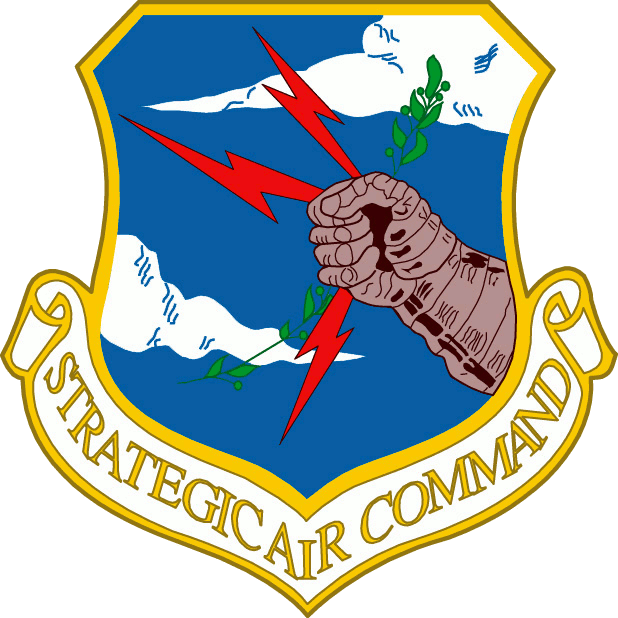
450th Bombardment Wing

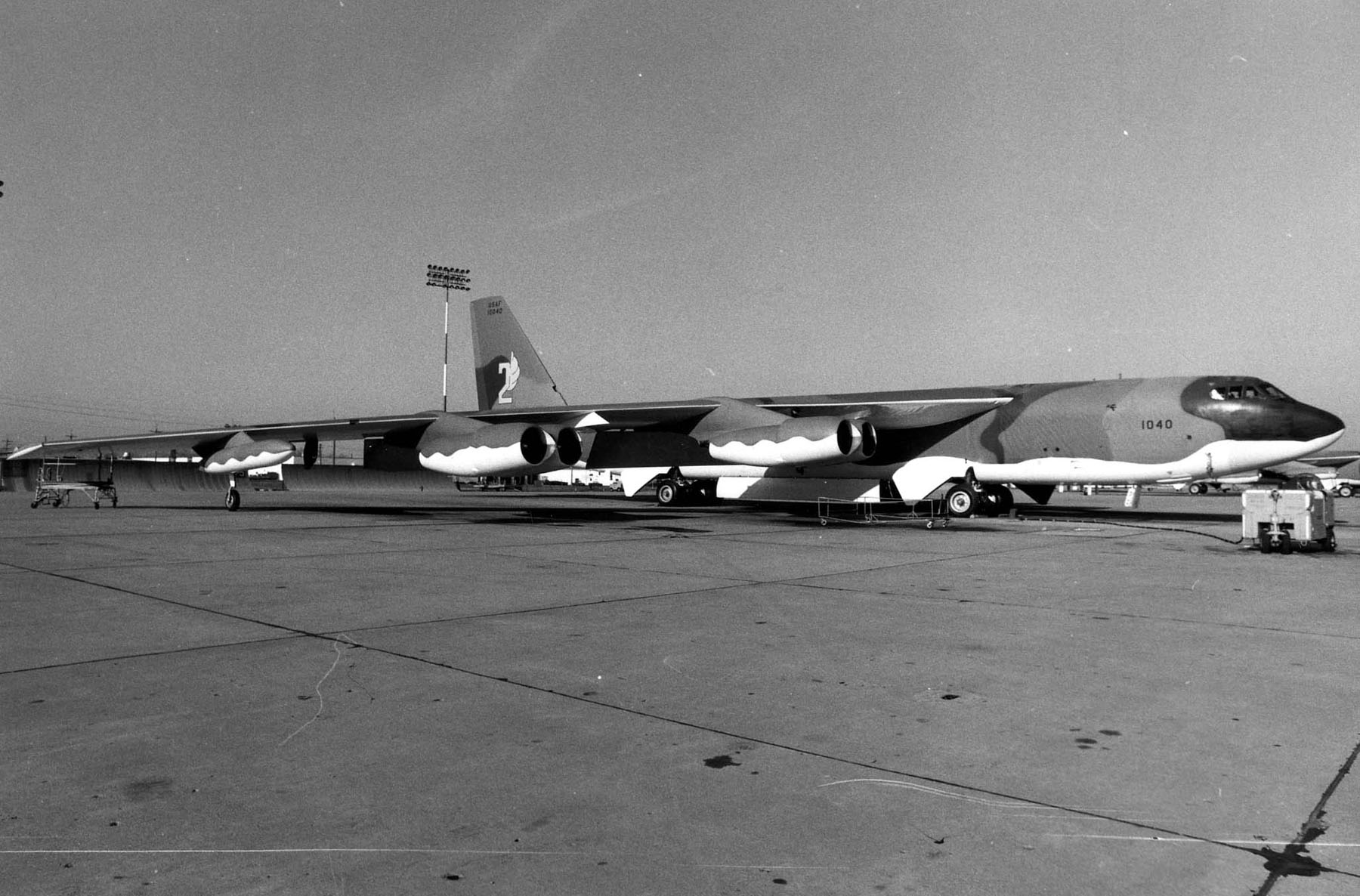
- Boeing B-52H 61-40, the last B-52 built, in later markings
- Active: 1954–1958, 1963–1968
- Country: United States
- Branch: United States Air Force
- Role: Bombardment
- Part of: Strategic Air Command

Insignia
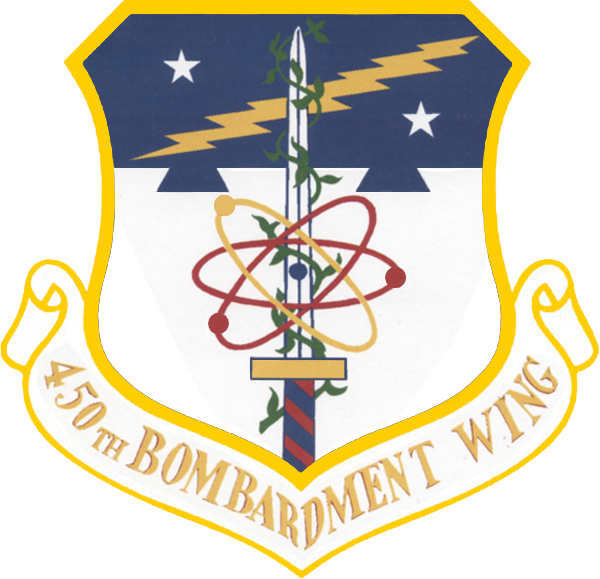
- 450th Bombardment Wing emblem (approved 7 February 1964)

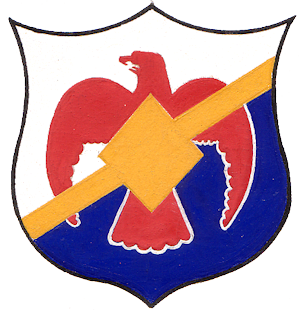
- 450th Fighter-Day Wing emblem (approved 14 September 1955)

The 450th Bombardment Wing is an inactive United States Air Force (USAF) unit. It was last assigned to the 810th Strategic Aerospace Division of Strategic Air Command at Minot Air Force Base, North Dakota. It was inactivated on 25 July 1968.

The wing was constituted as a fighter unit and activated briefly in the 1950s under Tactical Air Command at Foster Air Force Base, Texas, where it replaced a flying training wing. It was the first USAF combat wing to fly the North American F-100 Super Sabre.

The wing was redesignated as the 450th Bombardment Wing and activated at Minot in 1963, replacing the 4136th Strategic Wing taking over its Boeing B-52 Stratofortresses. It supported SAC combat operations in Southeast Asia during the Vietnam War. It was inactivated and replaced by the 5th Bombardment Wing, Heavy, in July 1968.

== History ==
For additional and related history, see 450th Bombardment Group

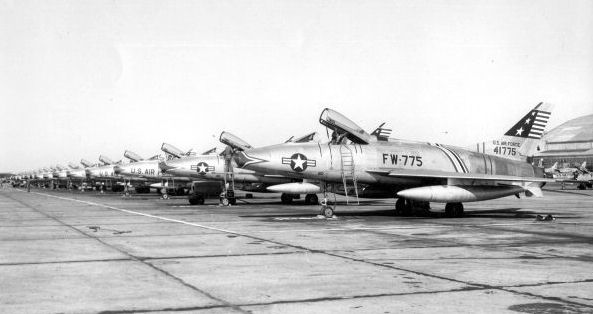
North American F-100s of the 450th Fighter-Day Group, about 1956. (Note: North American F-100C-5-NA Super Sabre 54-1775 identifiable. This aircraft was lost in combat during the Vietnam War when assigned to the 37th Tactical Fighter Wing at Phù Cát Air Base on 2 August 1968, its pilot was recovered.)

=== Tactical Air Command ===
Under Tactical Air Command, the 450th Fighter-Bomber Wing, was established and activated at Foster Air Force Base, Texas, on 1 July 1954, replacing and absorbing the assets of Air Training Command's 3580th Pilot Training Wing. Four operational squadrons (720th, 721st, 722d and 723d) were assigned to the 450th Fighter-Bomber Group, initially equipped with the North American F-86F Sabre. Its aircraft wore an approximation of the stars and stripes, with seven red and six white stripes on the trailing edge, and three stars in white on the blue forward portion of the fin. They also were designated with a colored, scalloped nose chevron. A second group, the 322d Fighter-Day Group, with three additional F-86 squadrons, was attached to the group, although assigned to Ninth Air Force.

The primary mission of the 450th was to maintain tactical proficiency for combat operations and to prepare for overseas deployments as part of Ninth Air Force. In early 1955, the 450th began receiving new North American F-100C/D Super Sabre aircraft, replacing the obsolescent F-86s. The 450th FBW was the first operational Tactical Air Command wing to be equipped with the F-100. With the change of equipment, the wing was redesignated as the 450th Fighter-Day Wing on 8 March 1955, with all its subordinate groups and squadrons also being redesignated. At the end of 1957, its subordinate 450th Fighter-Day Group and 450th Maintenance and Supply Group were inactivated and the wing's flying and maintenance squadrons were assigned directly to the wing under the Dual Deputate organization. (Note: Under this plan flying squadrons reported to the wing Deputy Commander for Operations and maintenance squadrons reported to the wing Deputy Commander for Maintenance) On 1 July 1958, the 450th was redesignated as the 450th Tactical Fighter Wing as part of a worldwide USAF naming reorganization.

On 28 August 1957, despite the fact that President Dwight D. Eisenhower appropriated funds for new construction at Foster, the base was ordered closed by the spring of 1959, with the resident 450th TFW inactivating. This closure was due to budgetary constraints in the Air Forces. The 450th TFW F-100 aircraft were reassigned to the 4th and 36th Tactical Fighter Wings, and all units assigned to Foster were inactivated by mid-December 1958.

=== Strategic Air Command ===
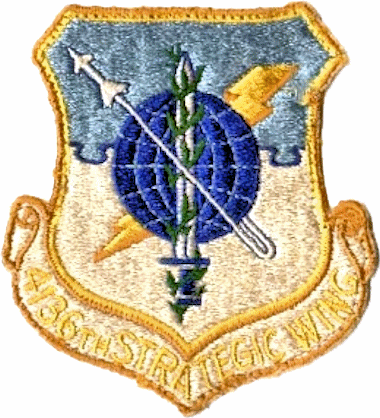
Emblem of the 4136th Strategic Wing

4136th Strategic Wing

The change in the mission of the 450th to strategic bombardment began on 1 September 1958 when Strategic Air Command (SAC) established the 4136th Strategic Wing at Minot Air Force Base, North Dakota, an Air Defense Command base, and assigned it to Fifteenth Air Force. The wing was transferred to the 821st Air Division on 1 January 1959, but it remained a headquarters only until June 1959, when the 906th Air Refueling Squadron, equipped with Boeing KC-135 Stratotankers and a squadron to provide security for SAC assets (possibly the 4136th Combat Defense Squadron) on the base were activated and assigned to the wing. A third squadron, the 60th Munitions Maintenance Squadron was added to look after the wing's special weapons. In March 1961, the 525th Bombardment Squadron moved, on paper, from the 379th Bombardment Wing, Homestesd AFB to Minot AFB, North Dakota, where it was assigned to the 4136th Strategic Wing. On 10 Mar 1961, the squadron received the first of 16 B-52H Stratofortress heavy bombers from the factory. This was part of SAC's plan to disperse its Boeing B-52 Stratofortress heavy bombers over a larger number of bases, thus making it more difficult for the Soviet Union to knock out the entire fleet with a surprise first strike. Starting in 1960, one third of the wing's aircraft were maintained on fifteen-minute alert, fully fueled, armed and ready for combat to reduce vulnerability to a Soviet missile strike. This was increased to half the squadron's aircraft in 1962. The 4136th (and later the 450th) continued to maintain an alert commitment until the wing was inactivated.

On 10 January 1962, a wing B-52H took off from Kadena Air Base, Okinawa, landing the next day at Torrejon Air Base, Spain, a distance of 12,532.28 miles. This set a record for unrefuelled flight in a straight line. The plane flew at altitudes between 40,000 and 50,000 feet msl. Later that year, on 26 October, the wing accepted the last B-52 manufactured by Boeing, B-52H serial 61-40.

Because the growing SAC mission at Minot was becoming the base's predominant mission, On 1 July 1962, SAC took over the base from ADC and formed the 862d Combat Support Group as the host for all organizations stationed there. At the same time it moved the 810th Air Division (later the 810th Strategic Aerospace Division) from Biggs Air Force Base to Minot and the division became the 4136th's headquarters. Later in 1962, the wing's bombers began to be equipped with the GAM-77 Hound Dog and the GAM-72 Quail air-launched cruise missiles, The 4136th Airborne Missile Maintenance Squadron was activated in November to maintain these missiles

450th Bombardment Wing

However, SAC Strategic Wings could not carry a permanent history or lineage and SAC looked for a way to make its Strategic Wings permanent. As a result, the 4136th SW was replaced by the 450th Bombardment Wing, Heavy (450th BW), which assumed its mission, personnel, and equipment on 1 February 1963. (Note: The 450th Wing continued, through temporary bestowal, the history, and honors of the World War II 450th Bombardment Group. It was also entitled to retain the honors (but not the history or lineage) of the 4136th. This temporary bestowal ended in 1968, when the wing was inactivated.) In the same way the 720th Bombardment Squadron, one of the unit's World War II historical bomb squadrons, replaced the 525th. The 60th Munitions Maintenance Squadron and the 906th Air Refueling Squadron were reassigned to the 450th. The 4136th's maintenance squadrons were replaced by ones with the 450th numerical designation of the newly established wing. Each of the new units assumed the personnel, equipment, and mission of its predecessor.

The 450th Bomb Wing was assigned to SAC's 810th Strategic Aerospace Division. The wing trained in global bombardment and air refueling operations. The wing added post attack command and control system (PACCS) airborne launch control system (ALCS) missions in 1967 and began active PACCS/ALCS missions in February 1968. the 450th supported SAC combat operations in Southeast Asia by furnishing KC-135 aircraft and crews between December 1964 and July 1968, and B-52 crews, from June to July 1968.

By 1968, Intercontinental ballistic missiles had been deployed and become operational as part of the United States' strategic triad, and the need for B-52s had been reduced. In addition, funds were also needed to cover the costs of combat operations in Southeast Asia. As part of a reduction of the B-52 force, SAC moved the 5th Bombardment Wing from Travis Air Force Base, California to Minot in July 1968, assuming the 450th Bomb Wing's mission, personnel, and equipment. redesignation to keep the senior organization on active service.

== Lineage ==
- Constituted as the 450th Fighter-Bomber Wing on 23 March 1953

Activated on 1 July 1954
Redesignated 450th Fighter-Day Wing on 8 March 1955
Redesignated 450th Tactical Fighter Wing on 1 July 1958
Inactivated on 18 December 1958

- Redesignated 450th Bombardment Wing Heavy on 15 November 1962 and activated (not organized)

Organized on 1 February 1963
Inactivated on 25 July 1968 (Note: In 2008, when the Air Force announced plans to form a Cyber Command, the 450th was to be redesignated the 450th Electronic Warfate Wing and activated as one of four wings in the command. Hoffman, Michael (21 March 2008). "New cyber command to comprise four wings". Air Force Times.. However, when Twenty-Fifth Air Force was activated, the new wing was not in its order of battle, although it appears that anticipatory patches for the unit were prepared.)

=== Assignments ===
- Ninth Air Force, 1 July 1954
- Eighteenth Air Force, 1 October 1957
- Twelfth Air Force, 1 January – 18 December 1958
- Strategic Air Command, 15 November 1962 (not organized)
- 810th Strategic Aerospace Division, 1 February 1963 – 25 July 1968

=== Stations ===
- Foster Air Force Base, Texas 1 July 1954 – 18 December 1958
- Minot Air Force Base, North Dakota 1 February 1963 – 25 July 1968

=== Components ===
Groups

- 322d Fighter-Day Group: 1 July 1954 – 18 November 1957 (attached)
- 450th Air Base Group: 1 July 1954 – 18 December 1958
- 450th Fighter-Bomber Group (later Fighter-Day Group): 1 July 1954 – 11 December 1957
- 450th Maintenance & Supply Group: 1 July 1954 – 18 November 1957

Operational Squadrons

- 720th Tactical Fighter Squadron (later Bombardment Squadron): 1 July 1958 – 18 December 1958; 1 February 1963 – 25 July 1968
- 721st Fighter-Day Squadron(later Tactical Fighter Squadron): 11 December 1957 – 18 December 1958
- 722d Fighter-Day Squadron(later Tactical Fighter Squadron): 11 December 1957 – 18 December 1958
- 723d Fighter-Day Squadron(later Tactical Fighter Squadron): 11 December 1957 – 18 December 1958
- 906th Air Refueling Squadron: 1 February 1963 – 24 July 1968

Support Squadrons

- 60th Munitions Maintenance Squadron: 1 February 1963 – 25 July 1968
- 450th Airborne Missile Maintenance Squadron: 1 February 1963 – 25 July 1968
- 450th Armament & Electronics Maintenance Squadron: 11 December 1957 – 18 December 1958; 1 February 1963 – 25 July 1968
- 450th Consolidated Aircraft Maintenance Squadron (later 450th Field Maintenance Squadron): 11 December 1957 – 18 December 1958; 1 February 1963 – 25 July 1968
- 450th Organizational Maintenance Squadron: 1 February 1963 – 25 July 1968

Medical Units

- 450th Tactical Hospital: 1 July 1954 – 11 December 1957
- 4462d USAF Infirmary (later 4462d USAF Hospital): 1 July 1954 – 18 December 1958

=== Aircraft ===
- F-86 Sabre, 1954–1955
- F-100 Super Sabre, 1955–1958
- B-52 Stratofortress, 1963–1968
- KC-135 Stratotanker, 1963–1968
- EC-135, 1967–1968

== See also ==
- List of B-52 Units of the United States Air Force
