= List of F-100 units of the United States Air Force =

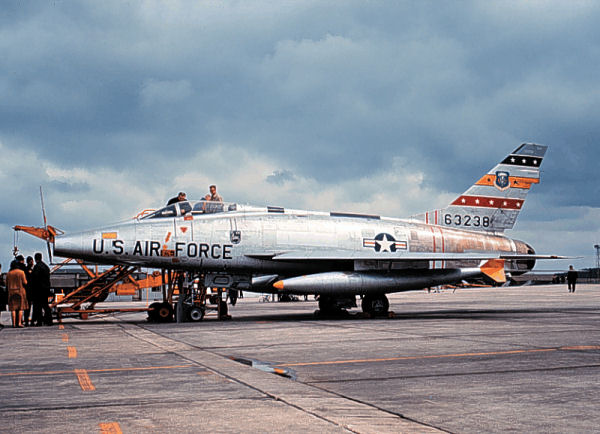
F-100D at Toul AB France, 50th TFW.

This is a List of F-100 Units of the United States Air Force by wing, squadron, location, tailcode, features, variant, and service dates. During the 1960s, squadrons were transferred regularly to different wings and bases temporarily, and sometimes permanently. In 1972, the Air Force eliminated the tailcode.

== Active Duty ==
Wing	Squadron	Location	Tailcode	Colors	Variants	Service Dates	Notes
3d TFW	90th TFS; 307th TFS; 308th TFS; 416th TFS; 429th TFS; 510th TFS; 531st TFS	England AFB, LA; England AFB, LA; England AFB, LA; England AFB, LA; England AFB, LA; England AFB, LA; England AFB, LA	CB CE; CP	Light Blue Blue Purple; Red	F-100D/F; F-100D/F; F-100D/F; F-100D/F; F-100D/F; F-100D/F; F-100D/F	1964-1971; 1964-1971; 1964-1971; 1964-1971; 1964-1971; 1964-1971; 1964-1971	Call Sign "DICE" Call Sign "BUZZARD"; Call Sign "RAMROD"
4th FDW/TFW	333d TFS; 334th TFS; 335th TFS; 336th TFS	Seymour Johnson AFB, NC; Seymour Johnson AFB, NC; Seymour Johnson AFB, NC; Seymour Johnson AFB, NC		Red; Blue; Green; Yellow	F-100C; F-100C; F-100C; F-100C	1958-1960; 1958-1960; 1958-1960; 1958-1960
8th TFW		Itazuke AB			F-100C	1955-1963
	35th TFS			Blue	F-100D/F	1956-1963
	36th TFS			Red	F-100D/F	1956-1963
	80th TFS			Yellow	F-100D/F	1956-1963
18th TFW					F-100
	12th TFS				F-100
	44th TFS				F-100
	67th TFS				F-100
20th TFW					F-100
	55th TFS				F-100
	77th TFS				F-100
	79th TFS				F-100
21st TFW					F-100D
	416th TFS				F-100		"Silver Knights"
	531st TFS				F-100
27th TFW					F-100D
	481st TFS				F-100D
	522d TFS				F-100D
	523d TFS				F-100D
	524th TFS				F-100D
31st TFW					F-100D
	306th TFS				F-100D
	307th TFS				F-100D
	308th TFS				F-100D
	309th TFS				F-100D
35th TFW					F-100
	120th TFS				F-100		CO ANG
	352d TFS				F-100
	612th TFS, Det 1				F-100		MISTY FAC
	614th TFS				F-100
	615th TFS				F-100
36th TFW	TFS				F-100
	22d TFS				F-100
	23d TFS				F-100
	32d TFS				F-100
	53d TFS				F-100
	461st TFS				F-100
	"SKYBLAZERS"				F-100
37th TFW	TFS				F-100D
	174th TFS				F-100
	355th TFS				F-100
	416th TFS				F-100
	612th TFS, Det 1				F-100		MISTY FAC
39th Air Division					F-100
	356th TFS				F-100
	418th TFS				F-100		"Green Demons"
	531st TFS				F-100
48th FBW/TFW		Chaumont AB later Lakenheath AB			F-100D
	492d TFS				F-100		tailcode 0-52833
	493d TFS				F-100
	494th TFS				F-100
49th FBW/TFW		Étain-Rouvres AB later Spangdahlem AB			F-100D
	7th TFS			Blue	F-100
	8th TFS			Yellow	F-100
	9th TFS			Red	F-100
50th FBW/TFW		Toul AB			F-100D
	10th TFS				F-100
	81st TFS				F-100
	417th TFS				F-100
57th FWW		Nellis AFB			F-100
	65th FWS				F-100
58th TFTW	TFS				F-100
	310th TFS				F-100
	311th TFS				F-100
	426th TFS				F-100
67th TRW	TFS				F-100
83d FDW	TFS				F-100
95th BW	TFS				F-100
113th TFW	TFS				F-100C/F
312th TFW	TFS				F-100D
316th Air Division	TFS				F-100
322d FDG	TFS				F-100
323d FBW	TFS				F-100A/D
325th FWW	TFS				QF-100
354th TFW		Myrtle Beach AFB			F-100D/F	1957-1969
	352d TFS			Yellow	F-100D	Sep 57 - Aug 66	"Yellow Jackets"
	353d TFS		MN	Red	F-100D	Mar 57 - Apr 66	"Black Panthers"
	355th TFS		MR	Blue	F-100D	Mar 57 - Feb 68	"Fighting Falcons"
	356th TFS		MB	Green	F-100D	Mar 57 - Mar 65	"Green Demons"
366th TFW	TFS				F-100F
388th TFW	TFS				F-100A
401st TFW					F-100D
	612th TFS				F-100D
	613th TFS				F-100D
	614th TFS				F-100D
	615th TFS				F-100D
402d FDW	TFS				F-100
405th FBW/TFW	TFS				F-100D
413th FDW/TFW	TFS				F-100
450th FDW/TFW	TFS				F-100C/D
474th FBW/TFW	TFS				F-100
475th TFW	TFS				F-100D
475th WEG	TFS				F-100
479th FDW/TFW	TFS				F-100A
506th TFW	TFS				F-100
3525th CCTW	TFS				F-100
3595th CCTW	TFS				F-100
3600th CCTW	TFS				F-100
4403d TFW	TFS				F-100
4510th CCTW	TFS				F-100
4520th CCTW	TFS				F-100
4525th CCTW/FWW	TFS				F-100
4530th CCTW	TFS				F-100
4554th CCTW	TFS				F-100
6000th Ops Wing	TFS				F-100
6200th ABW	TFS				F-100
6585th Test Group	Det 1, 82d TATS	WSMR			QF-100
7272d Flying; Training Wing	7235th SS	Wheelus AB			F-100
7499th Support Group	7407th SS				RF-100A	1955-1958

== Air National Guard ==
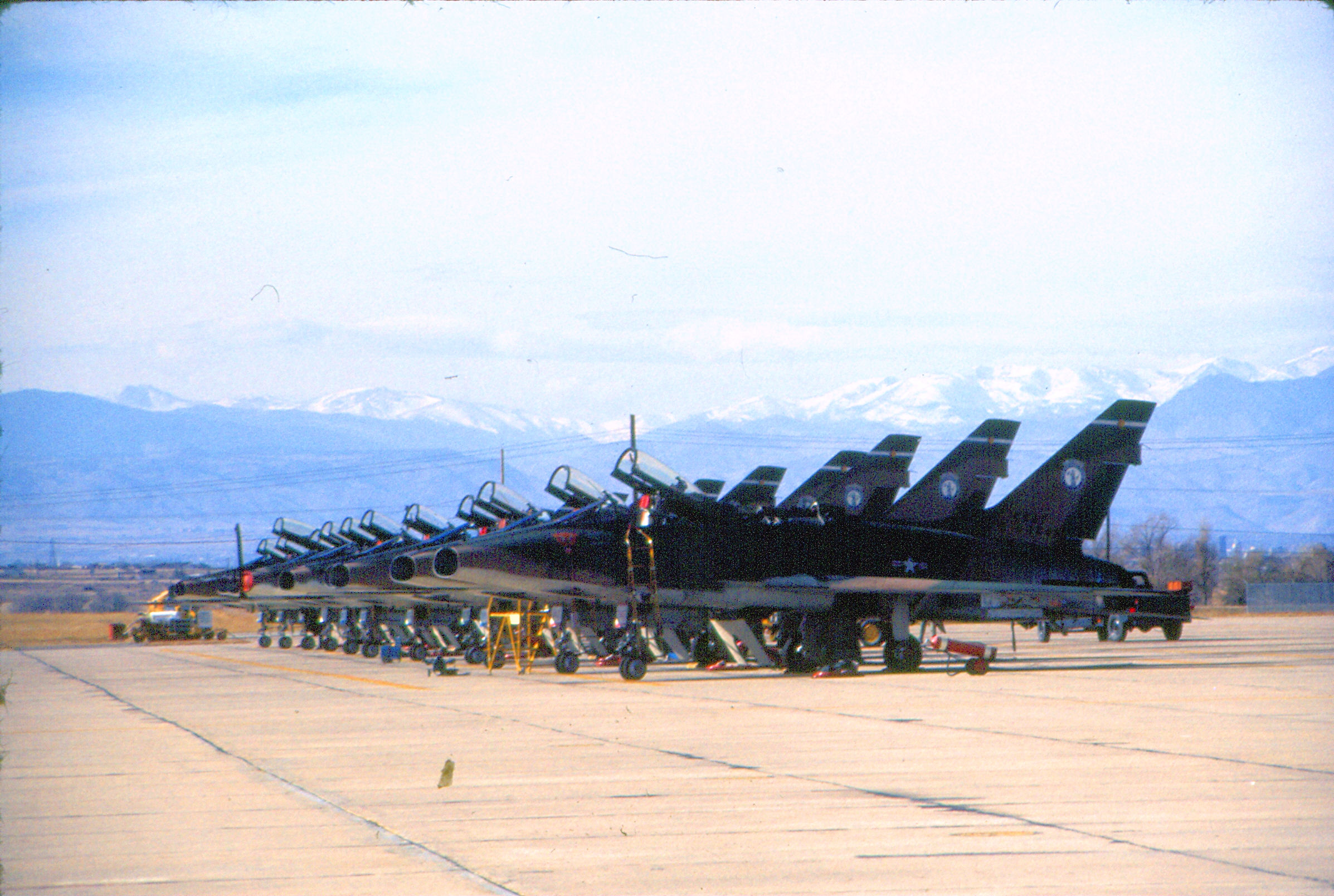
Colorado Air National Guard F-100Ds at Buckley ANGB, April 1974.

In 1969, F-100Ds began transferring out Vietnam to state-side Air National Guard bases. By 1972, the Guardsmen had received 335 D models.

Wing/Group	Squadron	Location	Tailcode	Identifying Features	Variants	Service Dates
102d TFG	101st TFS	Otis AFB	MA	Massachusetts ANG	F-100A	1971-1972
103d TFG	118th TFS	Bradley International Airport	CT	White noseband	F-100A/D	1960-1966; 1971-1979
104th TFG	131st TFS	Barnes Municipal Airport	MA	red/white/red tailfin	F-100D	1971-1979
107th TFG	136th TFS	Niagara Falls International Airport	SG	New York ANG	F-100C	1960-1969
113th TFG	121st TFS	Andrews AFB	XB	Dist of Columbia ANG	F-100A/C	1960-1971
114th TFG	175th TFS	Sioux Falls Regional Airport	SD	White line drawing of Wolf head	F-100D	1970-1977
116th TFG	128th TFS	Dobbins ARB	GA	Yellow fin cap, lower tail blue finstripe	F-100D	1973-1979
121st TFG	166th TFS	Lockbourne AFB	BP	Ohio ANG	F-100C; F-100D	1962-1971; 1971-1974
122d TFG	163d TFS	Indiana ANG	JZ	Yellow fin band, edged in white	F-100D	1971-1979
127th TFG	107th TFS	Selfridge ANGB	MI	Red fin band w/white "MICHIGAN"	F-100D	1972-1978
131st TFG	110th TFS	Lambert Field	SL	Red fin band, w/white "MISSOURI"	F-100C/D	1962-1979
132d TFG	124th TFS	Des Moines Airport, Iowa ANG	IA		F-100C; F-100D	1961-1971; 1971-1978
138th TFG	125th TFS	Tulsa International Airport	OK	Red fin band w/white "OKLAHOMA"	F-100D	1973-1978
140th TFG	120th TFS	Buckley ANGB	VS Cs; Vietnam only	Large tailfin chevron, Red mountain lion head	F-100C; F-100D	1961-1971; 1971-1974
149th TFG	182d TFS	Lackland AFB	SA	Red fin band w/white "TEXAS"	F-100D	1971-1979
150th TFG	188th TFS	Kirtland AFB	SK	Yellow Roadrunner w/DSM, yellow edged black chevrons&flash	F-100C	1958-1973
159th TFG	122d TFS	NAS New Orleans	JZ		F-100D	1970-1979
162d TFG	152d TFS	Tucson International Airport	AZ	Yellow fin chevron, intake band both outlined in black	F-100A/C/D	1958-1966; 1969-1978
177th TFG	119th TFS	Atlantic City International Airport	XA	New Jersey ANG	F-100C; F-100D	1964-1970; 1970-?
178th TFG	162d TFS	Springfield-Beckley Municipal Airport	OH	Red or green fin band, w/white "OHIO"	F-100D	1970-1978
179th TFG	164th TFS	Mansfield Lahm Regional Arpt, OH	OH	White-edged yellow tail band	F-100D	1972-1975
180th TFG	112th TFS	Toledo Express Airport	XP	Black & White checkerboard fin band, thinly edged in yellow	F-100D	1970-1979
181st TFG	113th TFS	Hulman Field	HF	Red/white/blue fin band w/white "INDIANA"	F-100D	1971-1979
184th TFG	127th TFS	McConnell AFB	BO	Kansas ANG	F-100C; F-100D	1961-1971; 1971-1979
185th TFG	174th TFS	Sioux City Municipal Airport	HA	Yellow chevron on tail, curved flash on fuselage, yellow nose	F-100C; F-100D	1961-1974; 1974-1976
188th TFG	184th TFS	Fort Smith MAP, Arkansas	NM	Red fin band w/white "ARKANSAS"	F-100D	1972-1979
