= Foster Air Force Base =

Former USAF facility in Victoria County, Texas

Foster Air Force Base Foster Field
- Part of Tactical Air Command
- Victoria County, near Victoria, Texas
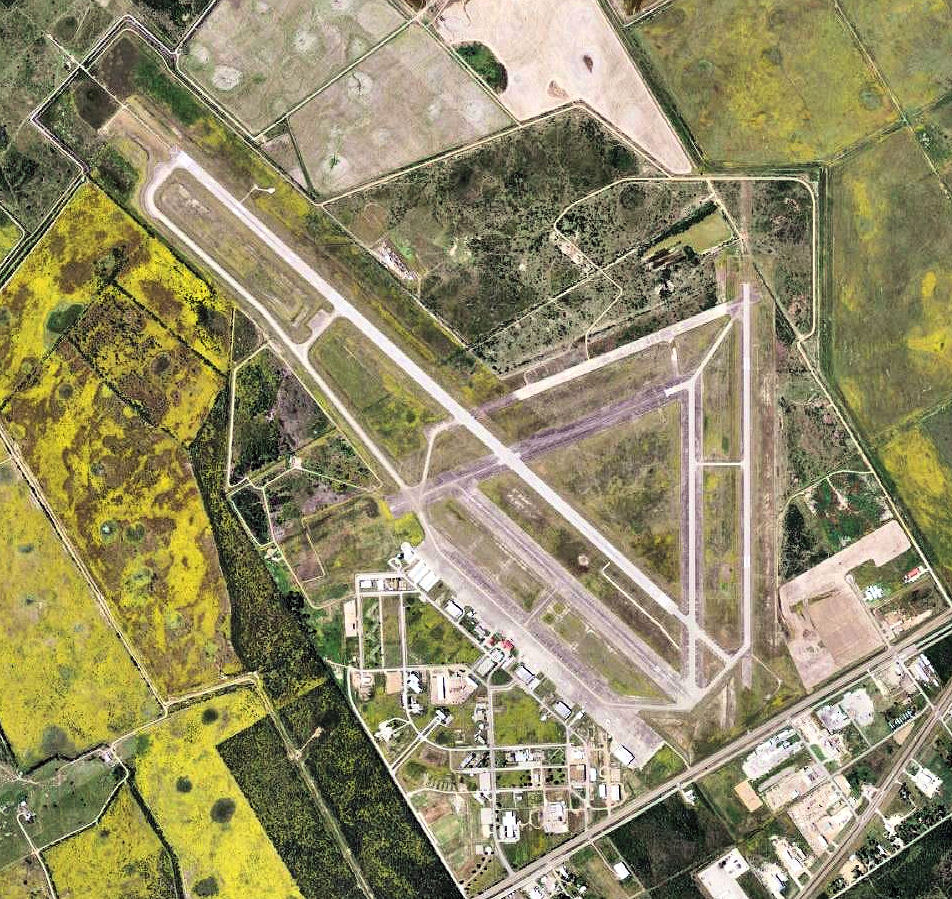
- 2006 USGS airphoto

Site information
- Type: Air Force Base

Location
- Coordinates: 28°51′09″N 96°55′07″W

Site history
- Built: 1941; 85 years ago
- In use: 1941–1945; 1953–1959

Foster Air Force Base is a former United States Air Force facility in Victoria County, Texas, United States, approximately six miles (10 km) east-northeast of the city of Victoria. Active from 1941 to 1945 and from 1952 to 1959, it was a flying training airfield during World War II, and a part of Tactical Air Command (TAC) during the early years of the Cold War as a tactical fighter and command base.

The airfield honored Lt. Arthur L. Foster (25 November 1888 – 10 February 1925), a Texas native from Georgetown. A U.S. Army Air Corps instructor, he was killed in a crash at Brooks Field, near San Antonio. Foster's son received his training and commission at the namesake base in 1942.

== World War II ==
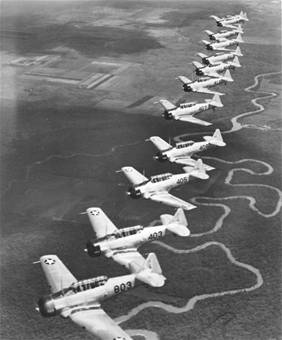
Formation of 12 AT-6 trainers over the Guadalupe River near Foster Field, Summer 1942

The airfield was established in the spring of 1941 as an advanced single-engine flying school for fighter pilots. A local funding campaign led by E. J. Dysart the previous spring had raised some $17,000 to locate the base at Victoria on a 1,000-acre (1.6 mi^{2}; 4.0 km^{2}) site as an economic asset. Subsequent government construction cost more than $4 million. Leases were formally approved by the War Department on 4 March, with construction beginning on 14 April by American-Friedman-Bitulithic Associates.

Victoria Army Airfield was activated on 15 May 1941 by the Gulf Coast Air Corps Training Center. The mission of the new airfield was the training of aviation cadets in the advanced phase of flying training. It was assigned to the Air Corps Advanced Flying School (single engine). In the advanced phase, the cadets flew advanced trainers, fighters and fighter-bombers. Pilot wings were awarded upon graduation and were sent on to group combat training. Graduates were usually graded as flight officers (warrant officers); cadets who graduated at the top of their class were graded as second lieutenants.

The initial class of cadets arrived in September 1941 and served under Lt. Col. Warren R. Carter, the first commander, with the first graduation in December, five days after Pearl Harbor; WACs began to arrive the following May. Cadets used AT-6 trainers and P-40 fighters to drill in aerial gunnery, though actual practice took place on ranges located on Matagorda Island and Matagorda Peninsula. In addition to these bombing ranges on Matagorda, at least ten auxiliary landing fields and a sub-base (Aloe AAF, built in 1943, five miles (8 km) southwest of Victoria) was controlled by Foster for emergency landings and aircraft overflow.

Foster Field 1943 classbook

The field was formally dedicated to 1st Lt. Arthur L. Foster on Sunday, 22 February 1942. Seventeen years earlier, he and aviation trainee Maj. Lee O. Wright were killed in the crash of a Curtiss JN-6H, AS-44806, about two miles (3 km) east of Brooks Field. Foster's widow, Mrs. Ruth Young Foster of San Antonio, unveiled a plaque that read "Dedicated to the memory of Lieut. Arthur Lee Foster, a pioneer in aviation who gave his life teaching others to fly."

In 1943, the War Department constituted and activated the 77th Flying Training Wing (advanced single-engine) at Foster and assigned it to the AAF Central Flying Training Command. The 77th was a headquarters for advanced training at several bases of AAF Central Flying Training Command.

Many pilots returning from overseas service were taught to become aerial gunnery instructors at Foster Field. In addition to the pilot training mission, Foster also served as a medical evacuation facility for injured veterans, and there were several housing facilities located on the base.

On 1 January 1945, the 2539th Army Air Forces Base Unit took control of the ground station administrative functions. As World War II wound down that summer, Foster Field took control of several smaller facilities as they were being closed. On 1 September, the mission at the airfield changed from pilot training to becoming a separation station. Foster Field itself was inactivated on 31 October, being placed in standby status. On 15 November 1945, the facility was completely closed, and the site returned to its pre-war owners, the Buhler and Braman estates.

== United States Air Force ==
The U.S. Air Force retained a recapture right, which it exercised at Foster and at many other former bases to accommodate the Korean War training surge. In the fall of 1951, the federal government purchased 1,376 acres (2.2 mi^{2}; 5.6 km^{2}) at the site, and Foster Field was reactivated for single-engine jet training. It was designated Foster Air Force Base on 1 September 1952, by Department of the Air Force General Order No. 38, dated 29 August.

=== Air Training Command ===
Foster AFB was assigned to the USAF's Air Training Command (ATC), with the 3580th Pilot Training Wing (basic, single-engine) assigned to the base on 1 May 1952 as the primary training organization and host wing. Students were a combination of cadets and commissioned USAF officer, with the first group of students graduating in March 1953 after three months of duty using T-28 propeller and T-33 jet trainers.

After the end of combat in Korea, Air Training Command returned various combat crew training responsibilities in front-line combat aircraft to the Strategic Air Command (SAC) and the Tactical Air Command (TAC) in 1954. The command was able to do this because bases like Greenville AFB, South Carolina, and Laredo AFB, Texas, had acquired sufficient facilities to assume their full share of the pilot training load. Various bases were transferred to the combat commands, among these was the transfer of Foster AFB to TAC on 1 July 1954.

=== Tactical Air Command ===
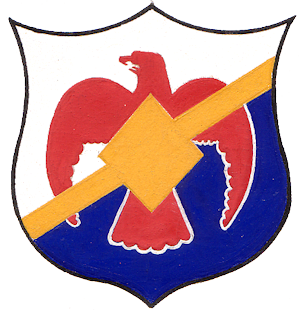
Emblem of the 450th Fighter-Day Wing

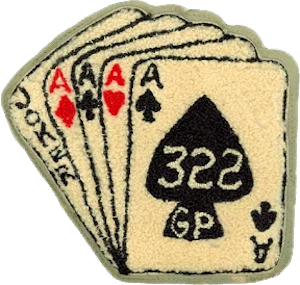
322d Fighter-Day Group Patch

Foster Air Force Base was designated a permanent military installation on 1 July 1954. Col Frank L. Dunn became the new commander, replacing Col C.D. Sonnkalb.

Under Tactical Air Command, the 450th Fighter-Bomber Wing, was activated at Foster, on 1 July 1954, replacing and absorbing the assets of the 3580th PTW. Four operational squadrons (720th, 721st, 722d, and 723d) were assigned to the 450th Fighter-Bomber Group, initially being equipped with the North American F-86F Sabre. Its aircraft wore an approximation of the stars and stripes, with seven red and six white stripes on the trailing edge, and three stars in white on the blue forward portion of the fin. They also were designated with a colored, scalloped nose chevron.

Along with the 450th, a second group, the 322d Fighter-Day Group was assigned to Foster, and attached to the 450th FDW. The 322d consisted of the 450th, 451st, and 452d Fighter-Bomber Squadrons, also flying the F-86F. Its aircraft wore a broad band on the fin with its playing card insignia superimposed. The 450th FBG was an operational unit, while the 322d took over the training mission formerly performed by ATC prior to the transfer of the base to TAC.

With these two fighter groups assigned to the base, assigned personnel increased to about 6,000. The primary mission of the 450th FBW was to maintain tactical proficiency for combat operations and to prepare for overseas deployments as part of Ninth Air Force.

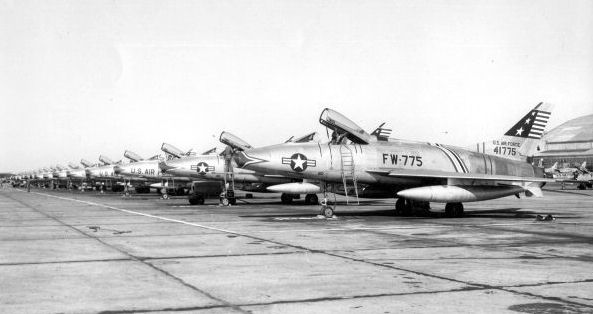
North American F-100s of the 450th Fighter-Day Group, about 1956. North American F-100C-5-NA Super Sabre, AF Ser. No. 54-1775 identifiable. This aircraft was lost in combat during the Vietnam War when assigned to the 37th Tactical Fighter Wing at Phu Cat Air Base on 2 August 1968, its pilot was recovered

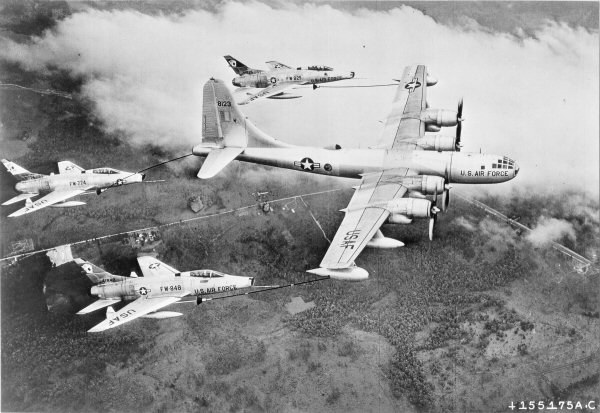
KB-50D Superfortress, AF Ser. No. 48-0123, of the 622d Air Refueling Squadron (4505th ARW) carrying out first triple-point refueling operation with three North American F-100C Super Sabres (AF Ser. No. 54-1825, 53-1774, and 54-1848) of the 451st Fighter-Day Squadron (322d FDG), 1956

In early 1955, the 450th FBW began receiving new North American F-100C/D Super Sabre aircraft, replacing the obsolescent F-86s. The 450th FBW was the first operational Tactical Air Command wing to be equipped with the F-100. With the change of equipment, the wing was redesignated as the 450th Fighter-Day Wing on 8 March 1955, with all its subordinate groups and squadrons also being redesignated.

On 8 July 1955, Foster AFB became the location of Headquarters, Nineteenth Air Force (19AF), under the command of Maj Gen Henry Viccellio. 19AF had no units or aircraft permanently assigned, with its mission focused on planning and carrying out force protection and rapid response using temporarily attached units deployed to overseas crisis locations. From Foster, Nineteenth AF responded to the 1958 Lebanon crisis, when the United States sent in forces to sustain a pro-Western government after a conflict in Iraq threatened to spill across the border. Also, attached to Nineteenth AF, the 450th FDW carried out the first overseas deployment of a complete tactical force as a unit in a training flight to Europe in 1956. The next year three Foster-based F-100s flew the first TAC single-engine, nonstop, round-trip mission over a great distance when they "attacked" Panama in a training maneuver.

On 1 July 1958, the 450th was redesignated as the 450th Tactical Fighter Wing (450 TFW) as part of a worldwide USAF renaming of its Fighter-Bomber and Fighter-Day units with a single mission designator.

== Closure ==
On 28 August 1957, despite the fact that President Dwight D. Eisenhower appropriated funds for new construction at the base, the base was ordered closed by the spring of 1959, with the resident 450th TFW and both groups inactivating. This closure was strictly due to budgetary constraints in the Air Force, however the closing came as a surprise to both Victorians and base commanders.

Nineteenth Air Force was moved to Seymour Johnson AFB, North Carolina, effective 1 September 1958. The 450th TFW F-100 aircraft were reassigned to the 4th and 36th Tactical Fighter Wings, and all units assigned to Foster were inactivated by mid-December 1958.

Despite a rigorous "Save Foster" campaign led in Washington by Senators Lyndon B. Johnson and Ralph Yarborough and congressman Clark Thompson, the base closed on 31 December 1958. It was formally inactivated effective 1 January 1959 by Department of the Air Force General Order No. 7, dated 9 February 1959. The 450th was reactivated by SAC in 1963 at Minot AFB, North Dakota, as the 450th Bombardment Wing (450 BW) a B-52H strategic bombardment wing to replace the 4136th Strategic Wing.

== Previous names ==
- Established as Victoria Army Airfield on 15 May 1941
- Foster Field, 15 January 1942 – 31 October 1945
- Foster Air Force Base, 1 May 1952 – 1 January 1959

== Major commands to which assigned ==
- Gulf Coast Air Corps Training Center, 15 May 1941
- Air Corps Flying Training Command (later Army Air Forces Flying Training Command, Army Air Forces Training Command), 23 January 1942 – 31 October 1945
- Air Training Command, 1 May 1952
- Tactical Air Command, 1 July 1954 – 1 January 1959

=== Major units assigned ===
- Air Corps Advanced Flying School (Single Engine) (later Army Air Forces Advanced Flying School, Army Air Forces Pilot School, Advanced (Single Engine), Army Air Forces Fighter Gunnery School), 15 May 1941 – 31 October 1945
- 75th Air Base Group, 4 September 1941 – June 1942
- 84th Air Base Group, 15 August 1941 – ca. August 1942
- 65th Air Base Squadron (later 65th Base Headquarters and Air Base Squadron), 4 September 1941 – 30 April 1944
- 77th Flying Training Wing (Advanced Single Engine), 25 August 1943 – February 1945

62d Single Engine Flying Training Group (originally 97th School Squadron), 4 September 1941 – 30 April 1944
63d Single Engine Flying Training Group (originally 48th School Squadron), 4 September 1941 – 22 March 1944

- 2505th AAF Base Unit (77th Flying Training Wing), 1 May 1944 – February 1945
- 2539th AAF Base Unit (Pilot School, Advanced, Single Engine) (later 2539th AAFBU (Fighter Gunnery School), 2539th AAFBU (Standby)), 1 May 1944 – 15 November 1945
- 3580th Pilot Training Wing (Basic, Single-Engine), 1 May 1952 – 1 July 1954

3580th Pilot Training Group (Basic, Single-Engine), 1 May 1952 – 1 July 1954
3580th Air Base Group, 1 May 1952 – 1 July 1954
3580th Maintenance & Supply Group, 1 May 1952 – 1 July 1954

- 450th Fighter-Bomber Wing (later 450th Fighter-Day Wing, 450th Tactical Fighter Wing), 1 July 1954 – 18 December 1958

450th Fighter-Bomber Group (later 450th Fighter-Day Group), 1 July 1954 – 11 December 1957
450th Air Base Group, 1 July 1954 – 1 January 1959
450th Maintenance & Supply Group, 1 July 1954 – 11 December 1957

- 322d Fighter-Day Group, 1 July 1954 – 18 November 1957
- Nineteenth Air Force, 8 July 1955 – 1 September 1958
- 10th Communications Group, 8 October 1956 – 15 October 1957
- 512th Tactical Control Group (later 512th Command and Control Group), 8 October 1956 – 15 July 1958

=== Major aircraft assigned ===
- AT-6 Texan, 1941–1945
- P-40 Warhawk, 1941–1945
- F-86 Sabre, 1954–1955
- F-100 Super Sabre, 1955–1958

== Post military use ==
The local economy suffered greatly from the closure of Foster AFB. In the summer of 1960, the General Services Administration approved the exchange of Aloe Army Airfield for Foster Field, and Victoria County Airport was moved to the latter site. The growth of the county airport slowly replaced the loss of Foster AFB as numerous businesses located there.

Two of the largest businesses to locate at Victoria County Airport were the Devereux Foundation, a therapeutic-education center, and Gary Aircraft, which repaired surplus C-54 Skymaster (Douglas DC-4) aircraft in 1968. In 1976 Foster became the site of Victoria Regional Airport, which provides passenger service and connections with major carriers.

The Victoria Composite Squadron of the Civil Air Patrol's Texas Wing continues to meet at the location.

== See also ==
- Texas World War II Army Airfields
- 77th Flying Training Wing (World War II)

== Notes ==
=== Bibliography ===
- Manning, Thomas A. (2005), History of Air Education and Training Command, 1942–2002. Office of History and Research, Headquarters, AETC, Randolph AFB, Texas OCLC 71006954, 29991467
- Shaw, Frederick J. (2004), Locating Air Force Base Sites, History’s Legacy, Air Force History and Museums Program, United States Air Force, Washington DC. OCLC 57007862, 1050653629
