= Manduria Airfield =

Airport in Manduria, Italy

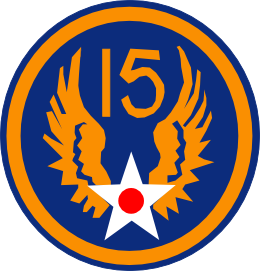
Manduria Airfield

Site information
- Type: Military airfield
- Controlled by: United States Army Air Forces

Location
- Coordinates: 40°26′33.11″N 017°37′49.33″E

Site history
- Built: 1943
- In use: 1943-1945

Location of Manduria Airfield, Italy

Manduria Airfield is a World War II airfield in Italy, located approximately 5 km north of Manduria, and about 390 km east-southeast of Naples. It was used by the United States Army Air Force Twelfth Air Force and later Fifteenth Air Force B-24 Liberator heavy bomber airfield.

- HQ 47th Bombardment Wing, 1 October 1943 – 15 May 1945
- 68th Tactical Reconnaissance Group, November 1943-April 1944, (Various Photo-Reconnaissance Aircraft)
- 98th Bombardment Group, 19 December 1943 – 17 January 1944, B-24 Liberator

In aerial imagery, the main runway, taxiways and many dispersal pads are clearly evident.

== History ==
Manduria Airfield, built in the 1930s for the Regia Aeronautica in Italy, played a key role during World War II. Initially used as a patrol base, it later became a significant U.S. Army Air Force base, hosting B-24 Liberator bombers and the 47th Bombardment Wing. The airfield also supported reconnaissance missions and electronic countermeasures.

== Post War ==
Post-war, the Italian Air Force used the base briefly. In 2011, it gained attention when it was repurposed to house refugees from North Africa.

The airfield of Manduria was closed in 1947 after World War II and was briefly reused by the Italian Air Force.

== Closure ==
Over the years, it was abandoned and fell into disrepair, though its airstrip remained visible. In 2011, the site became notable when it was used as a temporary camp for North African refugees during a migration crisis.

Currently, the Manduria Airfield is largely abandoned and has fallen into disrepair. Some remnants of its past, like the runways, are still visible, but the site is no longer operational. It briefly gained attention in 2011 when it was used to house refugees. While the airfield retains some historical significance, it has not been restored or repurposed for aviation purposes.
