= 47th Air Division =

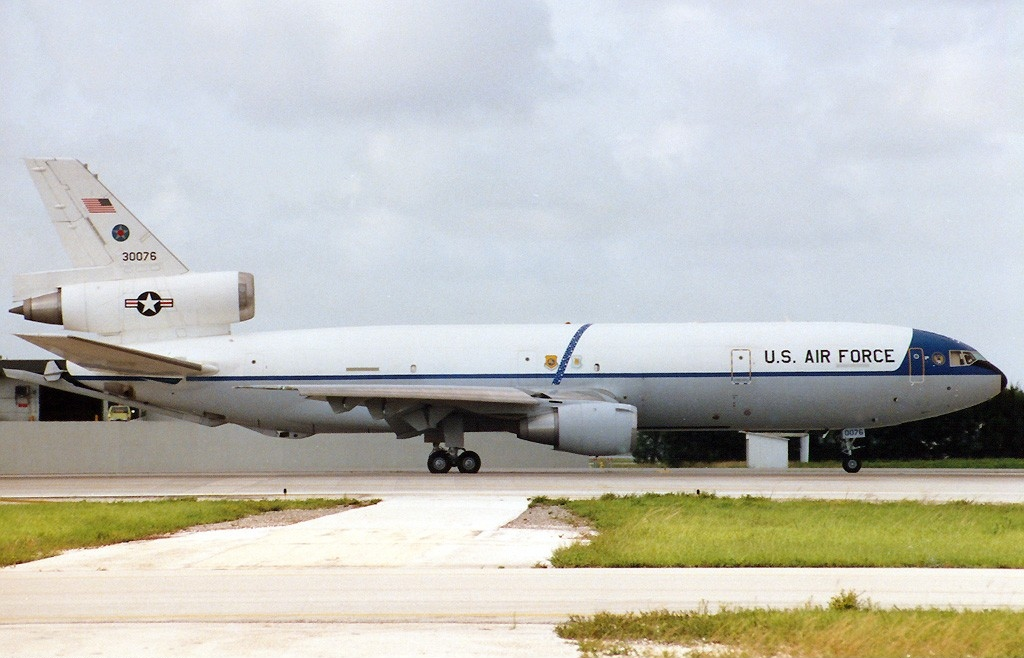
- KC-10A Extender of the division's 22d Bombardment Wing
- Active: 1940–1941; 1942–1945; 1951–1987
- Country: United States
- Branch: United States Air Force
- Motto: Sustineo Libertatem (Latin for 'I Sustain Freedom') (1943-1945)
- Engagements: European Theater of World War II

Insignia
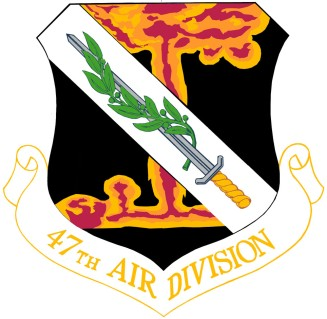
- 47th Air Division emblem (Note: Approved 6 September 1956. Description: Sable, an atomic cloud proper (shades of red, orange, and yellow) rising from base to chief, surmounted by a bend argent charged with a sword proper (blade silver, hilt and pommel, gold) the blade entwined with a branch of olive vert.)

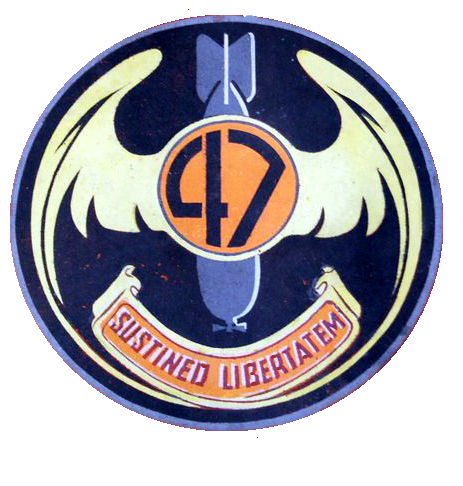
- 47th Bombardment Wing emblem

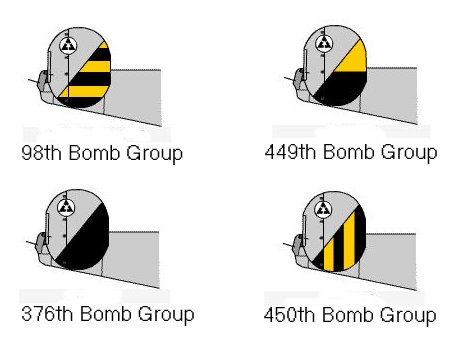
- Tail markings of the 47th Bomb Wing, Fifteenth Air Force

The 47th Air Division is an inactive United States Air Force unit. Its last assignment was with Strategic Air Command at Fairchild Air Force Base, Washington. It was inactivated on 27 February 1987.

The unit's origins begin with its predecessor, the World War II 47th Bombardment Wing was part of Fifteenth Air Force. Although earmarked for Eighth Air Force, it served instead with the Twelfth, and later, Fifteenth Air Forces, first as a fighter wing, then as a medium bomb wing, and finally as a heavy bomb wing. In the 1942 early 1943 period many of its assigned components did not actually operate under wing control, while other components were temporarily attached. Its components supported the bombing of Pantelleria Island and the invasions of Sicily, Italy, and southern France in 1943–1944. Wing aircraft also flew missions to the Balkans, Austria, France, and Germany, with the Rumanian oil fields as primary targets from April–August 1944. The final mission on 25 April 1945 struck marshalling yards at Linz, Austria. It returned to the United States in May 1945 to prepare for bombardment operations in the Pacific as a very heavy bombardment wing. On 7 September 1945, the wing became a paper unit and in mid Oct inactivated at Sioux City, Iowa.

Reactivated an intermediate command echelon of Strategic Air Command in June 1952, the 47th Air Division served as an intermediate echelon between Strategic Air Command's Eighth Air Force and operational units in the field. From April 1955 to March 1970, it filled the same role for the Fifteenth Air Force and from March 1970 to July 1971, for the Second Air Force. In July 1971 the 47th returned to Fifteenth Air Force control where it continued to supervise subordinate unit training and other activities.

The eruption of Mount St Helens in the state of Washington in May 1980 seriously affected division operations. Aircraft were dispersed to various bases while around the clock shifts removed the volcanic ash. The division as inactivated in February 1987 as a result of budget restraints.

== History ==
=== World War II ===
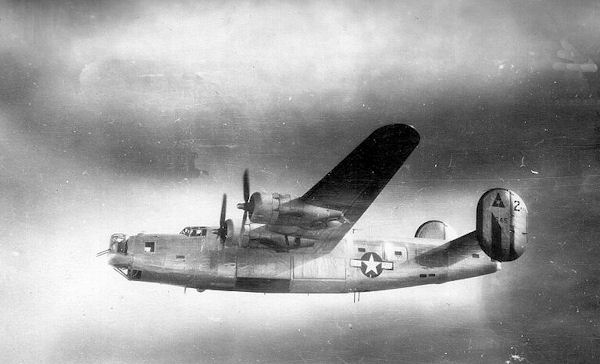
450th BG B-24 in natural aluminum finish, probably in 1945

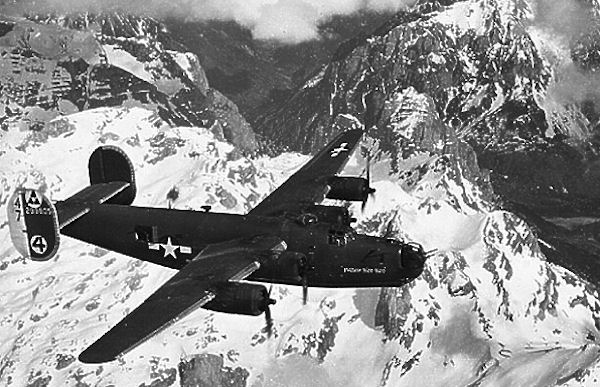
47th Bomb Wing B-24 over the Alps 1944

The organization traces its origins to the 7th Pursuit Wing which was activated on 19 October 1940 as part of General Headquarters Air Force. It was assigned to the Northeast Air District and its mission was air defense of the Northeastern United States, based at Mitchel Field on Long Island, New York. In August 1941, the wing was inactivated and its personnel used to form the 1st Air Support Command.

After a short period of inactivation, the unit was reactivated by the United States Army Air Forces in May 1942 as the 7th Fighter Wing as part of First Air Force, based at Harrisburg, Pennsylvania as a command and control organization, preparing fighter groups to be deployed to the European Theater.

After activation, the 7th Pursuit Wing concentrated on training three pursuit groups and in participating in field maneuvers. It completed training in the United States as a fighter wing and moved to North Africa in Nov 1942. Although earmarked for Eighth Air Force, it served instead with the Twelfth, and later, Fifteenth Air Forces, first as a fighter wing, then as a medium bomb wing, and finally as a heavy bomb wing.

Shortly after the Allied landings, the Wing established its headquarters in Casablanca, French Morocco on 11 November 1942, and commenced combat operations, being attached to the Moroccan Composite Wing (Provisional). The 7th Fighter Wing moved its headquarters and units to Algeria in January 1943 as the Allies moved eastward across North Africa, its units flying Curtiss P-40 Warhawks, and long-range Lockheed P-38 Lightnings, attacking German and Italian targets in advance of the ground forces. In the 1942 to early 1943 period, many of its assigned components did not actually operate under wing control, while other components were temporarily attached.

In January 1943, the wing was reassigned to XII Bomber Command and was redesignated as the 47th Bombardment Wing (Medium). (The reason for the designation change was that Seventh Air Force in Hawaii was reorganizing the air defense forces for the islands, and wanted to designate the wing there as the "seventh".) The wing was assigned Martin B-26 Marauder medium and Douglas A-20 Havoc light bomber groups, employing them in tactical roles across Algeria and Tunisia. Throughout 1943, the wing began to have heavy (Consolidated B-24 Liberator) units attached, eventually becoming a heavy bomber organization. Its components supported the bombing of Pantelleria Island and the Allied invasion of Sicily and the Allied invasion of Italy, moving to Manduria Italy in October 1943.

The wing was transferred to the new Fifteenth Air Force on 1 November 1943 along with four B-24 Bomb Groups (98th, 376th, 449th and 450th). The 47th Bomb Wing was named "The Pyramidiers", as the groups aircraft all carried a Pyramid symbol on their vertical stabilizers.

Its groups flew missions to the Balkans, Austria, France, and Germany, with the Romanian oil fields as primary targets from April through August 1944. The wing's groups flew missions over Southern France in August 1944 in support of Operation Dragoon, the Invasion of Southern France. The final combat mission on 25 April 1945 struck marshalling yards at Linz, Austria.

With the war in Europe ended, the 47th Bomb Wing returned to the United States in May 1945 to prepare for bombardment operations in the Pacific as a very heavy bombardment wing. It was assigned to Continental Air Forces, Second Air Force and was redesignated as a "Very Heavy" wing. The 47th Bomb Wing was and assigned first to Sioux Falls Army Air Field, South Dakota, then to Sioux City Army Air Base in Iowa to organize the Boeing B-29 Superfortress groups it would command under Eighth Air Force in the Pacific Theater.

The Atomic bombings and the end of World War II in August 1945. All personnel was transferred out of the wing on 17 September and the wing was inactivated on 15 October 1945.

=== Strategic Air Command ===
Redesignated as an Air Division, the 47th served as an intermediate echelon between Strategic Air Command's Eighth Air Force and operational units in the field, consisting of bombardment wings, strategic wings, strategic missile wings and strategic aerospace wings. From April 1955 to March 1970, the division filled the same role for Fifteenth Air Force and from March 1970 to July 1971, for Second Air Force. In July 1971 the 47th returned to Fifteenth Air Force control where it continued to supervise subordinate unit training and other activities.

In January 1975, Colonel (later Brigadier General) Eugene D. Scott was selected to command the 47th Air Division. What made this selection, and his subsequent assumption of command in February 1975, particularly noteworthy was that in lieu of being a Command Pilot, Colonel Scott was a Master Navigator, making him the first navigator in USAF history to assume command of an Air Force combat flying organization.

The May 1980 eruption of Mount St. Helens in the state of Washington seriously affected both 47th Air Division and 92d Bombardment Wing operations at Fairchild AFB, resulting in dispersal of Fairchild's B-52 and KC-135 aircraft to various bases while around-the-clock shifts removed the volcanic ash from facilities within the base perimeter.

Air Divisions were gradually phased out of the Air Force command structure after the end of the Vietnam War, with the Numbered Air Forces assuming direct command of its subordinate Wings. The 47th Air Division was one of the last few remaining air divisions to be inactivated, doing so in February 1987 due to a combination of organizational restructuring and budget restraints. Following the 47th's inactivation, SAC's remaining air divisions existed into the early 1990s until their usage ended with the 1992 major reorganization of the USAF Major Commands and the inactivation of SAC itself.

== Lineage ==
- Established as the 7th Pursuit Wing on 19 October 1940

Activated on 18 December 1940
Inactivated on 31 August 1941

- Redesignated 7th Fighter Wing on 30 May 1942

Activated on 7 June 1942
Redesignated 47th Bombardment Wing (Medium) on 23 February 1943
Redesignated 47th Bombardment Wing, Medium on 20 August 1943
Redesignated 47th Bombardment Wing, Heavy on 9 April 1945
Redesignated 47th Bombardment Wing, Very Heavy on 23 May 1945.
Inactivated on 15 October 1945

- Redesignated 47th Air Division on 1 February 1951

Organized on 10 February 1951
Discontinued on 16 June 1952
Activated on 16 June 1952
Redesignated 47th Strategic Aerospace Division on 1 May 1962
Redesignated 47th Air Division on 1 July 1963
Inactivated on 27 February 1987

=== Assignments ===
- General Headquarters Air Force, 18 December 1940 – 31 August 1941

Apparently further assigned to Northeast Air District (later 1st Air Force), 16 January 1941
Apparently further assigned to 1st Interceptor Command after 5 June 1941

- Eighth Air Force, 7 June 1942 (attached to First Air Force)
- XII Ground Air Support Command (later, XII Air Support Command), 27 September 1942

Remained attached to First Air Force to c. 17 October 1942
Attached to Task Force A, c. 17 October – c. 8 November 1942
Attached to Moroccan Composite Wing [Provisional], 31 December 1942 – 6 January 1943

- XII Bomber Command, 7 January 1943
- Northwest African Strategic Air Force, 18 February 1943
- XII Bomber Command, 1 September 1943
- Fifteenth Air Force, 1 November 1943 – 15 May 1945
- Army Service Forces, Port of Embarkation, 16 – 25 May 1945
- Second Air Force, 26 May – 15 October 1945
- Eighth Air Force, 10 February 1951 – 16 June 1952, 16 June 1952
- Fifteenth Air Force, 1 April 1955
- Second Air Force, 31 March 1970
- Fifteenth Air Force, 1 July 1971 – 27 February 1987

=== Components ===
==== Wings ====
- 5th Bombardment Wing: 30 June 1971 – 30 November 1972, 15 January 1973 – 22 January 1975
- 6th Bombardment Wing (later 6th Strategic Aerospace Wing, 6th Strategic Wing): 10 February 1951 – 1 July 1963 (detached 31 October 1955 – 26 January 1956), 1 October 1976 – 1 October 1985
- 22d Bombardment Wing: 1 January 1962 – 31 March 1970, 30 June 1971 – 1 August 1972, 1 October 1985 – 23 January 1987
- 28th Bombardment Wing: 30 June 1971 – 15 January 1973
- 91st Strategic Missile Wing: 15 January 1973 – 22 January 1975
- 92d Strategic Aerospace Wing (later 92d Bombardment Wing): 30 June 1971 – 23 January 1987
- 93d Bombardment Wing: 1 July 1959 – 30 June 1971
- 319th Bombardment Wing: 30 June 1971 – 15 January 1973
- 320th Bombardment Wing: 2 July 1966 – 31 March 1970, 30 June 1971 – 1 October 1972, 1 October 1982 – 23 January 1987
- 341st Strategic Missile Wing: 15 January 1973 – 23 January 1987
- 456th Strategic Aerospace Wing (later 456th Bombardment Wing): 30 June 1971 – 1 October 1972
- 509th Bombardment Wing: 10 February 1951 – 1 July 1958 (detached 1 March – c. 6 May 1951, 4 June 1952 – 2 September 1952, 10 July – 9 October 1954, 26 January – 30 April 1956).
- 4128th Strategic Wing: 5 January – 1 July 1959

==== Groups ====
- 8th Pursuit Group: 16 January – 31 August 1941
- 14th Fighter Group: 18 February – 14 March 1943
- 17th Bombardment Group: attached C. 31 December 1942 – 17 February 1943, assigned 18 February – 7 June 1943.
- 33d Pursuit Group (later 33 Fighter Group): 16 January – 31 August 1941, 27 September – 6 December 1942, 3 – 14 March 1943.
- 57th Pursuit Group: 16 January – 31 August 1941
- 68th Tactical Reconnaissance Group: attached 4 – 31 December 1943, assigned 1 January – c. June 1944 (not operational, 27 May – June 1944).
- 81st Fighter Group: 27 September 1942 – 5 January 1943 (detached c. November 1942 – 5 January 1943)
- 82d Fighter Group: assigned c. November – c. 31 December 1942, 18 February 1943 – 13 January 1944 attached 1 – 17 February 1943
- 98th Bombardment Group: 24 September – 1 November 1943, 17 November 1943 – 19 April 1945
- 310th Bombardment Group: 18 February – 3 November 1943
- 319th Bombardment Group: attached c. February 1943 – unknown, assigned c. 1 – 7 June 1943
- 320th Bombardment Group: 18 February – 7 June 1943
- 321st Bombardment Group: 27 March – 3 November 1943
- 325th Fighter Group: 27 March – 7 June 1943
- 376th Bombardment Group: 24 September – 1 November 1943, 17 November 1943 – 19 April 1945
- 449th Bombardment Group: 11 December 1943 – 15 May 1945
- 450th Bombardment Group: 11 December 1943 – 15 May 1945
- 451st Bombardment Group: 11 December 1943 – 7 April 1944

==== Squadrons ====
- 11th Air Refueling Squadron: 31 March 1970 – 30 June 1971
- 15th Bombardment Squadron: attached c. – 10 January February 1943
- 81st Bombardment Squadron: attached 2 February – 25 March 1943
- 82d Bombardment Squadron: attached 2 February – 25 March 1943
- 91st Air Refueling Squadron: 1 July 1971 – 1 April 1972
- 95th Fighter Squadron: attached 31 December 1942 – 5 January 1943
- 307th Air Refueling Squadron: attached 1 August 1951 – 2 February 1953 (further attached to 6th Bombardment Wing until 15 June 1952)
- 916th Air Refueling Squadron: 31 March 1970 – 1 April 1972

–

=== Stations ===
- Mitchel Field, New York, 18 December 1940 – 31 August 1941
- Olmsted Field, Pennsylvania, 7 June 1942
- Langley Field, Virginia, 17 – 24, October 1942
- Casablanca, French Morocco, 11 November 1942
- Chateaudun Du Rhumel Airfield, Algeria, 11 January 1943
- El Guerrah, Algeria, 1 March 1943
- Souk-el-Arba Airfield, Tunisia, 8 June 1943
- Hammamet Airfield, Tunisia, 7 August 1943
- Manduria, Italy, 1 October 1943 (advance echelon), 11 November 1943 – 15 May 1945 (main body)
- Sioux Falls Army Air Field, South Dakota, 29 May 1945
- Sioux City Army Air Base, Iowa, 10 July – 15 October 1945
- Walker Air Force Base, New Mexico, 10 February 1951 – 16 June 1952
- Castle Air Force Base, California, 11 July 1959
- Fairchild Air Force Base, Washington, 30 June 1971 – 27 February 1987

=== Aircraft and missiles ===
- Bell P-39 Airacobra 1941, 1943–1944
- Curtiss P-40 Warhawk 1941, 1942–1944
- Martin B-26 Marauder 1942–1943
- Lockheed P-38 Lightning 1942–1944
- Douglas A-20 Havoc 1943–1944
- North American A-36 Apache 1943–1944
- Boeing B-17 Flying Fortress 1943–1944
- Consolidated B-24 Liberator 1943–1945
- North American B-25 Mitchell 1943
- North American P-51 Mustang 1943–1944
- Boeing B-29 Superfortress 1951–1952
- Boeing B-50 Superfortress 1951–1955
- Boeing KB-29 Superfortress 1951–1954
- Convair B-36 Peacemaker 1952–1957
- Boeing KC-97 Stratofreighter 1954–1958, 1962
- Boeing B-47 Stratojet 1955–1958, 1962–1963
- Boeing B-52 Stratofortress 1957–1987
- Boeing KC-135 Stratotanker 1958–1987
- Atlas (CGM-16) 1962–1963
- Boeing EC-135 1963–1973
- Minuteman-II (LGM-30F) 1973–1987
- Minuteman-III (LGM-30G) 1973–1987
- Boeing RC-135 1976–1987
- McDonnell Douglas KC-10 Extender 1985–1987

== See also ==
- List of United States Air Force air divisions
