= PSD =

PSD may refer to:

== Government and military ==
- Payment Services Directive, EU regulation for payment services
- Pesticides Safety Directorate, UK
- Prabowo Subianto Djojohadikusumo, president of Indonesia
- Presidential Study Directive, a kind of national security directive from the Obama presidency
- Prevention of Significant Deterioration (PSD) permit, under the Clean Air Act (United States)
- Protective Services Detail, Personal Security Detachment, or Personal Security Detail; US military security details
- Armoured Division (Finland) (Finnish: Panssaridivisioona)

== Language ==
- Pennsylvania Sumerian Dictionary, lexicography project for the ancient language isolate
- Plains Indian Sign Language, historic North American lingua franca (ISO 639-3: psd)
- Proto-South Dravidian, unattested language of south India

== Places ==
- Philippine School for the Deaf, a school in Pasay, Philippines
- Port Said Airport, Egypt (IATA: PSD)
- Poudre School District, Colorado, United States

== Political parties ==
=== Africa ===
- Social Democratic Party (Angola), a political party of Angola
- Social Democratic Party (Benin), a political party of Benin
- Social Democratic Party of Madagascar, a political party of Madagascar
- Social Democratic Party (Rwanda), a political party of Rwanda
- Socialist Destourian Party, former name (to 1988) of the ruling party in Tunisia, currently called Constitutional Democratic Rally

=== Americas ===
- Parti social démocratique du Québec, a former provincial political party in Canada
- Democratic Socialist Party (Argentina), a defunct political party of Argentina
- Social Democratic Party (Brazil, 1945–65), a defunct political party of Brazil
- Social Democratic Party (Brazil, 1987)–2003), a defunct political party of Brazil
- Social Democratic Party (Brazil, 2011), a current political party of Brazil
- Social Democratic Party (El Salvador), a political party of El Salvador
- Social Democratic Party (Mexico), a defunct political party of Mexico
- Social Democratic Party (Nicaragua), a political party of Nicaragua

=== Europe ===
- Civil Movement "People's Self-Defense", a defunct political movement in Ukraine which was part of the Our Ukraine–People's Self-Defense Bloc electoral alliance
- Party of Socialists and Democrats, a major political party of San Marino
- Social Democratic Party of Albania, a minor political party of Albania
- Social Democratic Party (France), a defunct political party of France
- Social Democratic Party (Moldova), a political party of Moldova
- Social Democratic Party (Portugal), a major political party of Portugal
- Social Democratic Party (Romania), a major political party of Romania
- Social Democratic Party (Spain), a defunct political party of Spain

== Science and engineering ==
=== Computing ===
- Personal or portable storage device
- .psd, a Photoshop document file extension
- Professional Scrum Developer, a course leading to certification for Scrum (development)
- Power spectral density, the distribution of power per unit time into frequency components composing that signal.

=== Medicine ===
- Protein S deficiency
- Post-stroke depression
- Postsynaptic density, a specialization of the cytoskeleton at the synaptic junction
- Psychiatric service dog

=== Other uses in science and engineering ===
- Particle size distribution, in granular materials
- Platform screen doors, in railway platforms
- Position sensitive device or detector, a two-dimensional photodetector
- Positive semidefinite (disambiguation)
- Power spectral density, distribution of power of a signal
- Program Service Data, data displayed on HD radio receiver

== Other uses ==
- PSD (rapper), a Californian rapper and hip-hop producer
- Private Sector Development, term used in international development
- PSD Bank, German banking group
- FK PSD, a handgun
