= Agricultural safety and health =

Prevention of occupational hazards

Agricultural safety and health is an aspect of occupational safety and health in the agricultural workplace. It specifically addresses the health and safety of farmers, farm workers, and their families.

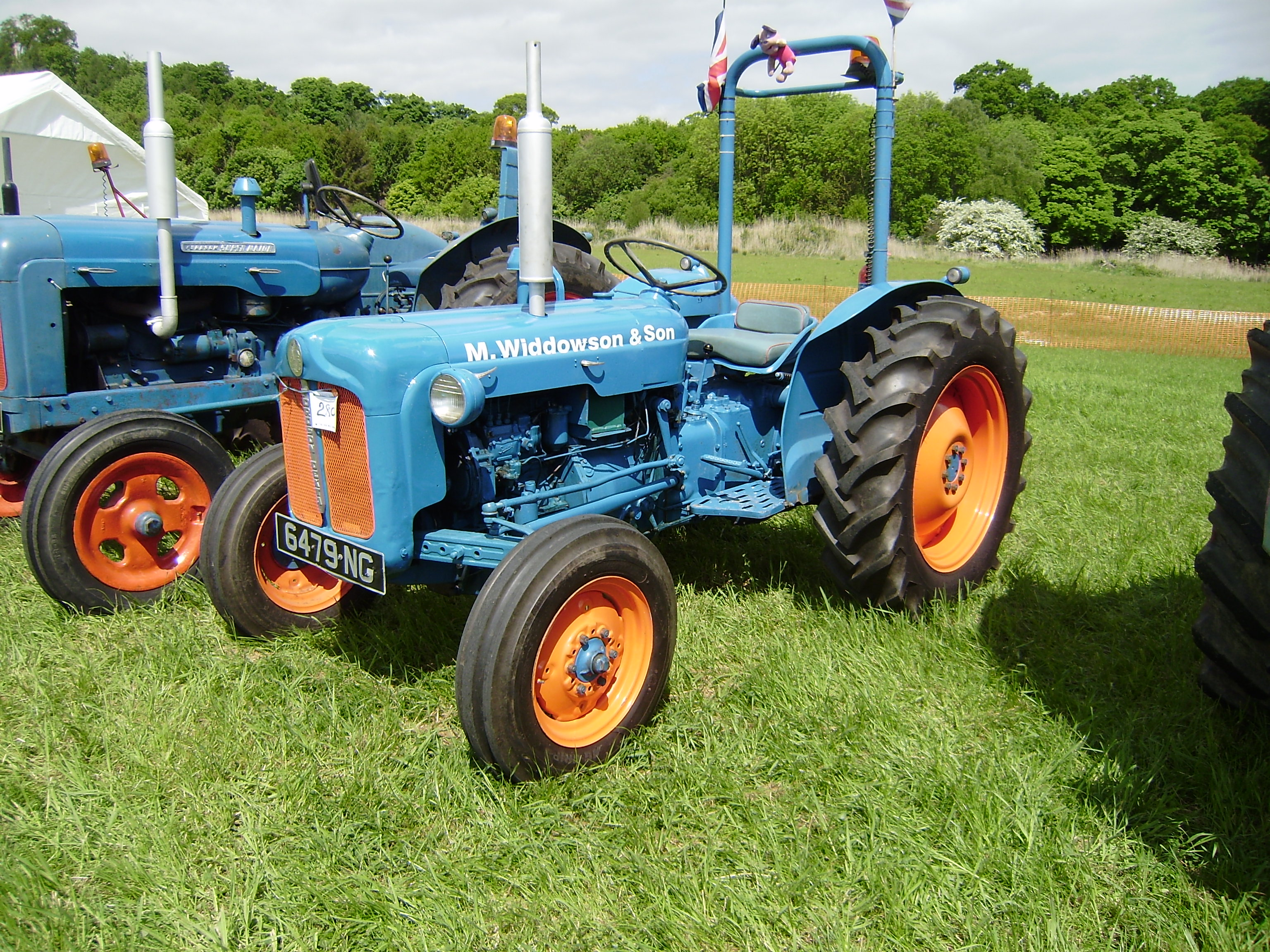
A Fordson Dexta tractor with a rollover protection structure bar retro-fitted.

Contrary to perceived belief and notions of work in the agricultural landscape, agriculture is one of the most dangerous industries in the US, with a variety of factors causing injuries and death in the workplace. Many of the injuries, long-term or short, prevalent in the occupation are hearing loss, musculoskeletal disorders, respiratory diseases, poisoning from pesticides and chemicals, reproductive issues, and many other ailments. These injuries are caused mainly by loud noises from machinery, stress from transporting heavy objects, gases and fumes like methane and from chemicals, and other various causes, respectively.

== Overview ==
The agriculture industry is one of the most dangerous occupations and has led to thousands of deaths due to work-related injuries in the US. In 2011 the fatality rate for farmworkers was 7 times higher than that of all the workers in the private industry, a difference of 24.9 deaths for every 100,000 people as opposed to 3.5 deaths for every 100,000 people in the private industry. The National Institute for Occupational Safety and Health (NIOSH) estimated that 374 farmers and farmworkers died due to a work-related injury in 2012, tractor overturns being the number one cause death. An average of 113 youth between the ages of 16–19 years die annually from agriculture related injuries (1995-2002). About 167 farmworkers each day are affected by a lost-work-time injury in which 5% of them suffer from permanent damage. Non-fatal injuries that farmworkers are at high risk for include work-related lung problems, hearing loss due to noise, skin diseases, various cancers due to exposure to certain chemicals as well as prolonged exposure to the sun.

The National Institute for Occupational Safety and Health (NIOSH) has stressed that while the industry produces a necessary product needed by everyone, the industry is diminishing in prevalence and only recently, has been viewed as an occupation needed of further knowledge and development of safety measures and standards. Following a 1988 national conference held at Ohio State University and University of Ohio, the report Agriculture at risk was published in the Journal of Agricultural Safety and Health. This report was funded by NIOSH, who assisted with the initiation of research and implementation regarding agricultural health issues, illnesses, and safety measures in the workplace.

The demographics behind agricultural work has been changing throughout the years, with the rise of more private, family owned farm industries, as well as the increasing prevalence of young farm workers. Young farm workers are at a greater risk than older or adult farm workers of injury, but this issue is not addressed to the full extent due to nonexistence in the statistics of the Bureau of Labor, which only regards those of age 16 and older. Increase of young farm workers could be attributed to the rising trend of "return to farming". Not only young workers, but women farm workers are increasing at a steady rate as the lead operators of the farm industries.

To supplement incomplete official injury statistics, especially on small or family-owned farms exempt from standard occupational reporting requirements, public health researchers also monitor news media reports to track agricultural injuries and fatalities. Studies have evaluated large language models to automate the extraction of incident details and injury classification codes from agricultural news articles, achieving over 90% accuracy compared to manual coding.

== Hazards ==
Illnesses and injuries regarding agriculture can vary from one farm to another, according to which industry or sector the farm specializes in. This becomes more apparent as the environment of each farm is different according to these specialties, which in turn poses different areas of risk factors leading to injuries and ailments. In all though, there are similarities in the risk factors and illnesses that agricultural workers face on a day to day basis as in injuries from machinery, large animals, pesticides, respiratory illness-causing factors, musculoskeletal disorders, hearing loss, reproductive issues regarding women, and many more. The most common illnesses seem to be musculoskeletal disorders, pesticide poisoning, and respiratory diseases.

According to a 2011 study by the National Agricultural Statistics Service, a major cause of injury and deaths in the workplace comes from farm machinery/vehicles, specifically tractor overturns.

=== Musculoskeletal disorders ===
Musculoskeletal disorders can arise from a number of factors, but the main causes seem to be from livestock and large machinery/equipment. Machinery are usually devoid of safety measures and pose a greater threat, since agricultural workers fix and operate these machines themselves for utilization in the fields. These machines may also be run while repairs are under way, causing even more instances of potential injuries. Bending, twisting, and stretching motions that are apparent when operating these equipment causes much back and neck strain, leading to more exacerbated conditions over time. This is in regards to not only agricultural workers operating machinery, but also workers in the fields, who experience pain and strains in the wrists, back, hips, and knees. Livestock can also pose a threat to the musculoskeletal systems of the body due to their large weight and varied behavior, possibly leading to kicking and unintentional blows by the animal to the agricultural worker. No matter the cause, it is apparent that musculoskeletal disorders are common in the agricultural industry and need to be addressed to treat the ailment as quickly as possible. In a study regarding agricultural work safety climate of approximately 300 North Carolina migrant farmworkers, 40% had musculoskeletal ailments and many reported numerous days working while ill. Many underestimated the safety measures they were able to obtain and thought that risks were inevitable due to the risks involved in agriculture. Musculoskeletal disorders are categorized into acute or first time injuries and chronic long-term ailments according to many acute injuries.

=== Pesticide poisoning ===
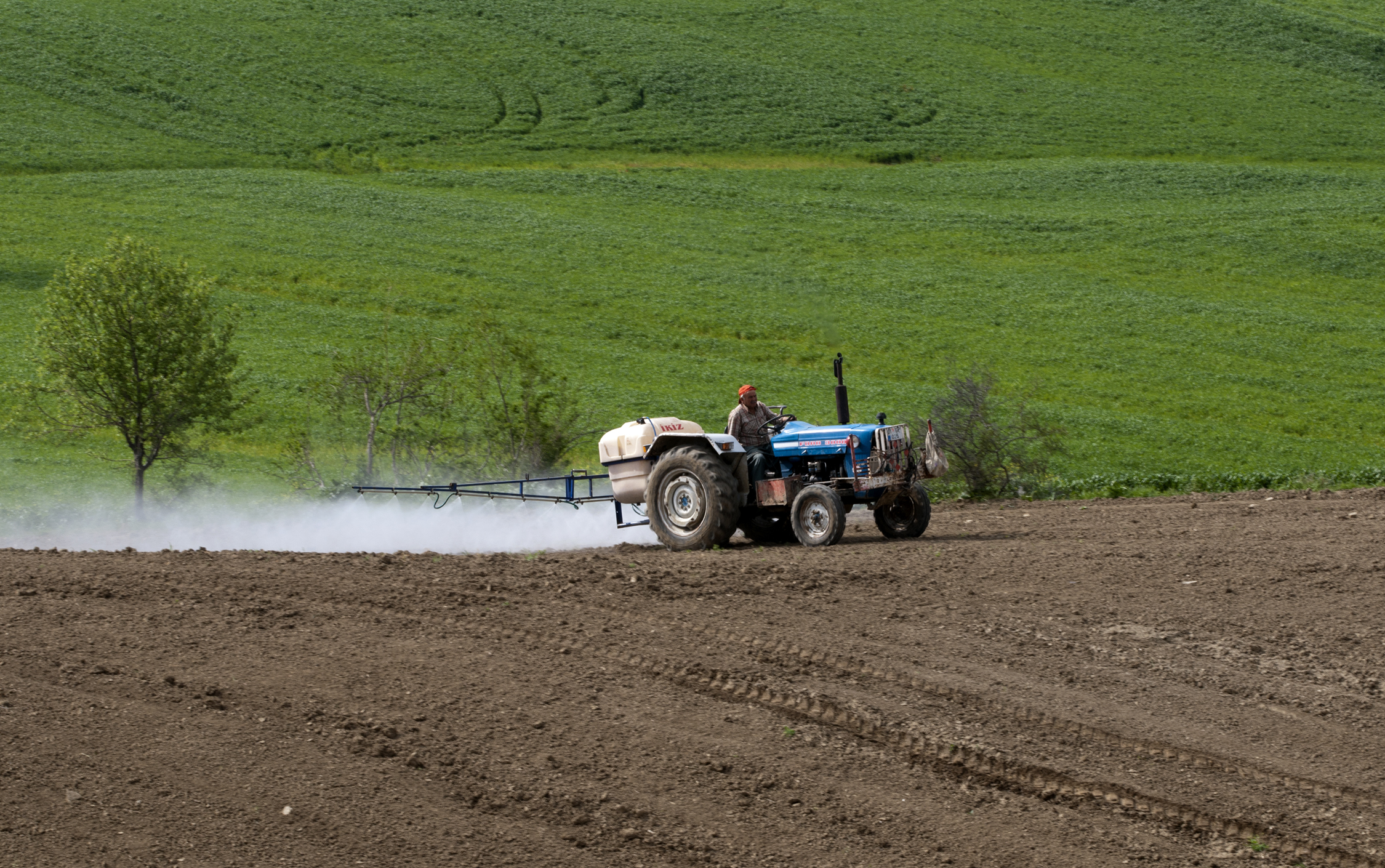
Pesticide application for chemical control of nematodes in a sunflower planted field. Karaisalı, Adana - Turkey.

Chemicals and pesticides used to control and/or kill insects, vegetation, fungi, and small animals can also be harmful to humans. Human toxicity of pesticides varies based on the type of chemical, route of exposure, the dose of the chemical, and duration of exposure. Some of the common chemicals used in agriculture are bipyridyls, organophosphates, and carbamates. There are two types of toxicity: acute toxicity and chronic toxicity. Acute toxicity describes the effects which appear shortly after exposure, generally within 24 hours. Chronic toxicity describes the delayed effects of a substance after exposure. Acute toxicity and chronic toxicity are not necessarily indicative of one another; a chemical that has high chronic toxicity does not necessarily have high acute toxicity, as is the same for the opposite relationship. There is a wide range of effects that pesticides may have on humans. Exposure may result in reproductive effects, carcinogenic effects, neurotoxicity, immunosuppression, and more.

==== Exposure Risk ====
Exposure to pesticides can occur at any point of contact, from the process of making pesticides to use in agricultural tasks like harvesting crops or irrigating fields. Agricultural workers are at an exceptionally high risk of pesticide poisoning due to their high exposure rates. Part of the problem arises from a lack of adequate safety measures as well as standardized utilization of personal protective equipment. The majority of the United States' use of pesticides is in agriculture, with 75% being used in this industry.

==== Symptoms ====
Individual symptoms may vary based on pesticide and route of exposure, however general symptoms of pesticide poisoning include headache, fatigue, weakness, dizziness, restlessness, nervousness, perspiration, nausea, diarrhea, loss of appetite, loss of weight, thirst, moodiness, soreness of joints, skin irritation, eye irritation, and irritation of the nose and throat. Moderate to severe symptoms include stomach cramps, muscle twitches, extreme weakness, mental confusion, blurred vision, difficulty breathing, fever, intense thirst, and death. If someone displays any of these signs after being exposed to a pesticide, contact a medical professional immediately.

In a study by the California Department of Pesticide Regulation and the SENSOR- Pesticides program, regarding pesticide poisoning incidence rates out of 3,271 cases, 402 individuals had medium severity illnesses from pesticide exposure with high severity cases being rare and lower severity being more common. From this study, the pesticides that were deemed to cause most cases of diseases were cholinesterase inhibitors, pyrethroids, inorganic compounds, and dithiocarbamates. Insecticides, specifically cholinesterase inhibitors (N-methyl carbamates and organophosphates) cause a majority of the illnesses in 54% of the individuals in the case. Some of the more common symptoms seen in pesticide poisoning were nervous system impairments, headaches, gastrointestinal issues, respiratory impairments, skin impairments, inflammations, and many more.

=== Respiratory diseases ===
Recently, agricultural respiratory diseases have been rising from development of animal production facilities causing toxic fumes to permeate the area. Much of the irritants involved in causing these diseases are ammonia, organic dust, hydrogen sulfide, bacterial microorganisms, mold, and various hydrocarbons.

Respiratory Diseases common to agriculture include:

- Farmer's Lung (hypersensitivity pneumonitis)
- Asthma
- Organic Dust Toxic Syndrome
- Silo Filler's Disease

=== Hazards from livestock ===
==== Large livestock ====
Handling livestock involves a risk of injury. Large livestock, especially, have the ability to crush the handler, and without proper training and competent workers, unrestrained cattle can seriously injure workers, visitors, and even vets. Proper handling facilities that are kept in working order are suggested when dealing with larger livestock. A suitable race and crush may be helpful, but makeshift equipment has more hazards and risk of injury. When keeping bulls, most accidents occur because of the lack of precaution when handling the bull. Because bulls are temperamental, training will be helpful when exposing the bull to others. Bulls who are willing to be trained can be taught to associate people will their needs, such as feeding, exercise, and grooming. Training will then make a less hazardous workplace if the bull is docile. At 10 months, it is suggested to ring bulls, and the ring must be inspected regularly. Competent workers and proper handling will avoid fatal injuries.

==== Zoonosis ====
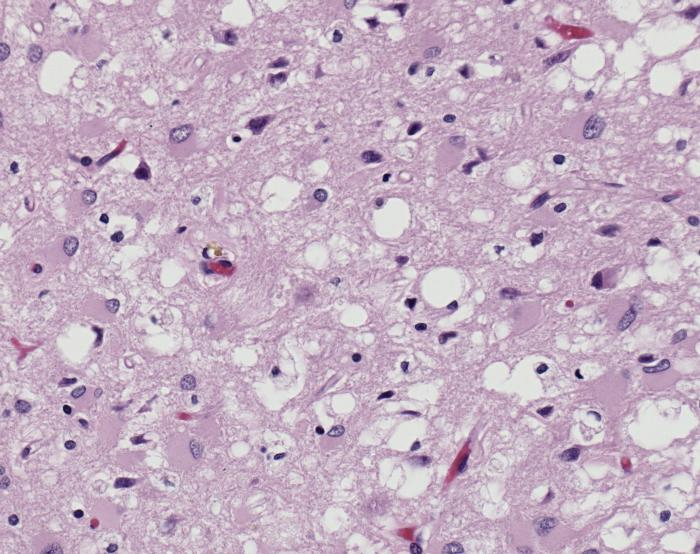
Magnified 100X, and stained with H&E (hematoxylin and eosin) staining technique, this light photomicrograph of brain tissue reveals the presence of prominent spongiotic changes in the cortex, and loss of neurons in a case of variant Creutzfeldt-Jakob disease (vCJD).

Exposure to animal with diseases are a risk for agricultural workers. Zoonosis are diseases that are transmitted from infected animals to humans. Most zoonotic diseases are caused by organisms such as parasites, bacteria, prions, fungi, protozoa, and viruses, which reside within the animal but can be pathogens to humans. Direct or indirect transmission from feces or bodily fluids can result in infection, and consuming animal products that are contaminated can also become a cause of infection. Because of their close contact with animals, farmers, veterinarians, ranchers, and other agricultural workers are more at risk for contracting zoonotic diseases.

Examples of zoonotic diseases include anthrax, avian influenza, brucellosis, cryptosporidiosis, giardiasis, leptospirosis, mycobacterium bovis, orthohantavirus, psittacosis, rabies, tularemia, and Zika virus.

== Migrant farm workers ==
Migrant farm workers are especially at risk for workplace injury and illness with pesticide exposure causing the majority of illness. A migrant farm worker is an individual who is required to be absent from a permanent place of residence for the purpose of seeking employment in agricultural work. There is estimated to be 1 to 2.7 million farm workers in the United States. The majority of these workers follow the seasonal crop harvest across the country, or a state. On average, according to the BLS in 2017, a farm worker makes $11.41 per hour with an annual income of $23,730. In 2017, the US Dept. of HHS reported the federal poverty line, for a family of four, as being $24,600.

=== Injury and illness ===
Migrant farm workers are exposed to several different kinds of pesticides, tractor and mechanical injuries. The Bureau of Labor Statistics (BLS) 2015 Survey of Occupational Injuries and Illnesses reported 36,000 farm workers experienced an injury, and approximately 420 reported work related fatalities. These numbers for deaths are four-fold higher than other comparable work related industries such as hunting, fishing, and construction. However, this does not represent the actual amount of injury and death that occurs in this industry because the majority of states do not require reporting of accidents or injuries.

=== Safety regulation ===
Because of the low SES of the migrant farmworker, and the fact that the agricultural industry is one of the least regulated commercial industries in the country, the farming industry has been able to ignore the safety and healthy working conditions that are causing harm to these workers. For farms, the lack of regulation from OSHA to post and inform their employees about the types of chemicals and pesticides used on the job site has perpetuated the lack of knowledge and understanding that these workers and their families are exposed to daily. OSHA requires that farms with 11 or more employees must provide drinking water, toilets, and hand washing water. However, 95% of farms in the US fall below this threshold, and are therefore exempt from these OSHA regulations; around 69% of farms who were inspected that do meet the 11 employee or more requirement were found not to be in compliance.

=== Contaminated water ===
Because many farms do not employ 11 or more workers, they are exempt from OSHA employee water provision requirements. Some of these workers resort to bathe, drink and use what they perceive to be clean water from local sources, for their personal needs, when in fact the water is often contaminated with pesticides, chemicals, and organic wastes. Unfortunately, many migrant farm workers do not realize that the water being sprayed on the crops, and next to the places they live, contains pesticide. There are stories of workers running through sprinklers of water to cool themselves off, but they are running through water mixed with pesticide. Children who play in ditches next to fields where the pesticide-contaminated water runs into are at high risk for pesticide exposure. Workers and their families are often exposed to pesticides when it is being sprayed as it drifts in the wind.

=== Unique considerations ===
Many seasonal migrant farm workers fear repercussions if they seek better work conditions because many do not have work visas and fear deportation. Additionally, when migrants are hired, they often do not come with experience, knowledge about their work, or own safety gear, and they are most often not provided with work safety training or safety equipment. When the training happens, they are not carried out in a manner that shows learning or understanding of what was taught. Many migrant workers do not report injury or illness for fear of losing their work, being deported, language barriers, inability to access healthcare, and lack of knowledge about the problem as being a result of their work. According to the 2013-2014 National Agricultural Workers Survey (NAWS), 75% of all agricultural workers were foreign born, 31% reported they could speak English 'well,' and had an average completed education of 8th grade. These demographics make farmworkers particularly at risk for work-related injury and illness because they may not be able to understand safety instructions of warning if those instructions or warnings are given. In addition, the average income of a farm worker is below the federal poverty line, which puts them at risk for further health disparities.

== Youth in agricultural operations ==
Incidents that occur involving farm machinery are a risk to children under the age of 13 and those who are employed in any way must be properly trained by their employer in order to use the machinery. According to the law, children under 13 cannot drive any farm machinery, and children under 16 cannot operate machinery that is equipped with mechanisms that could seriously injure them. Even if there is an adult present within the machine, children under 13 cannot sit within the cab of an agricultural vehicle. As for children or adults who are not there for labor, use of a trailer may be allowed under the condition that the trailer is in good condition, has good seating, is fitted with guard railing, and supervision is supplied at all times.

Children are also prohibited from being within the vicinity of a potentially dangerous animal. Without competent supervision, animals can exhibit behaviors that may severely injure a child in the area. Children are exposed to potential danger in the farm, so areas that chemicals are stored, reservoirs, slurry pits, grain bins, and that contain farm machinery, must be properly enclosed with fencing or locked for precaution.

Nonfatal injuries in agriculture that occur may permanently disable, injure, or kill youths over 13 on the farm in the United States. An estimation of $1 billion annually has been spent on nonfatal injuries to youths in agriculture. The National Institute of Occupational Safety and Health has created the Childhood Agricultural Injury Prevention Initiative for young workers and their employers to reduce the amount of injures on the job. 33,000 children have farm-related injuries each year in the United States, and 113 who are less than 20 years of age have died from farm-related injuries between 1995 and 2002.

=== History ===
In 1991, the Surgeon General's Conference in Des Moines, Iowa, was held to bring awareness to the risks that children face in production agriculture. A session titled "Intervention: Safe Behaviors Among Adults and Children," emphasized the need for children's injury prevention. This conference was followed by the Childhood Agricultural Injury Prevention symposium in Marshfield, Wisconsin, that sought to propose policies, further education on agricultural injuries among children, and demonstrate relevant research on the topic. As a result of the symposium, the National Committee for Childhood Agricultural Injury Prevention (NCCAIP) was formed. From this, the National Action Plan was finalized over 16 months, and it addressed agricultural injuries that occurred to children.

== Organic farmers ==
Agricultural farming in our society directly relates to organic farming because the choice directly comes from the farmer and their practice. It is important to understand how choosing organic practice can positively and negatively effect the farmer. While many boycott eating non-organic for health reasons, there is very little needed by farmers to gain the approval "organic." In regard to the farmers, it is hard in many locations to ensure stable crops and a successful outcome without indeed adding pesticides and farming tactics that do not align with organic farming practice.

== Regulation ==
Unlike other industries that impose labor laws and occupational safety and health regulations in the workplace, agriculture deals with diverse production, large labor force and an array of environmental conditions that makes it difficult to address.

=== United Kingdom ===
In the United Kingdom, the first law towards agriculture safety started in 1878 with the Threshing Machines Act 1878. As the industry mechanized, the Chaff-Cuttings Machine (Accidents) Act 1897 provided slightly more statutory protection. In 1947, the Health, Welfare, and Safety in Non-Industrial Employment Hours of Employment of Juveniles: Report by a Committee of Enquiry was presented to the Parliament, leading to two acts. These two acts, the Agriculture (Poisonous Substances) Act 1952, and the Agriculture (Safety, Health, and Welfare Provisions) Act 1956. The Agriculture (Poisonous Substances) Act 1952, which protected employees against risks of poisoning, while the Agriculture (Safety, Health and Welfare Provisions) Act 1956 gave workers and children health protection and safeguards. However, it was repealed and modified in 1975 by the Agriculture (Safety, Health and Welfare Provisions) Act 1956 (Repeals and Modifications) Regulations 1975.

The most recent event has occurred in 2008 in which the Pesticide Safety Directorate (PSD) is now under the Health and Safety Executive (HSE), with the Department for Environment, Food, and Rural Affairs (DEFRA) being the previous department to oversee the PSD.

=== United States ===
The Occupational Safety & Health Administration logo.

In the United States of America, the Occupational Safety and Health Administration (OSHA) overviews agricultural safety. as with all OSHA standards, it is covered by Section 5(a)(1) and Section 5(a)(2), which requires employers to "furnish to each of his employees employment and a place of employment which are free from recognized hazards that are causing or are likely to cause death or serious physical harm to his employees" and to comply with occupational safety and health standards promulgated under this act." Agriculture Safety is covered by the Agriculture (29 CFR 1928), which mostly covers farm equipment and operation, and the General Industry (29 CFR 1910) standards, which defines workplace safety for all industries. In addition to that, there are 28 OSHA-approved State Plans that have standards that are "at least as effective as OSHA's and may have different or more stringent requirements".

The Migrant and Seasonal Agricultural Worker Protection Act, passed in 1983, was created to protect seasonal migrant farm workers in the areas of transportation, housing, adequate payment, and safety protections. The law also made it mandatory for all employers using contract labor to register with the US Department of Labor, which was intended to facilitate greater enforcement of migrant workers rights. In 1995, the Environmental Protection Agency (EPA) established the Worker Protection Standard (WPS) which establishes minimum requirements to protect workers from pesticide poisoning and injury. The WPS has since been modified and expanded. Basic protections of the WPS include safety training; notification of where and when pesticides have been sprayed; the keeping of workers out of pesticide-treated areas until safe; employers to provide protective equipment, facilities for decontamination, and facilitate emergency medical care if necessary.

== See also ==
- Agricultural education
- Grain facility occupational exposure
- Rollover protection structure
