= Grain entrapment =

Being submerged in grain, with possibly fatal consequences

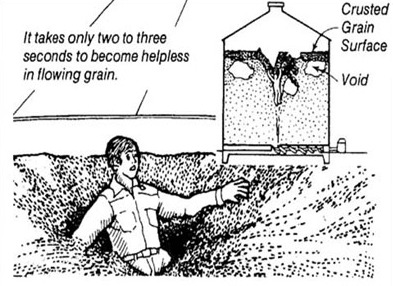
U.S. Occupational Safety and Health Administration illustration of grain entrapment

Grain entrapment, or grain engulfment, occurs when a person becomes submerged in grain and cannot get out without assistance. It most frequently occurs in grain bins and other storage facilities such as silos or grain elevators, or in grain transportation vehicles, but has also been known to occur around any large quantity of grain, even freestanding piles outdoors. Usually, unstable grain collapses suddenly, wholly or partially burying workers who may be within it. Entrapment occurs when victims are partially submerged but cannot remove themselves; engulfment occurs when they are completely buried within the grain. Engulfment has a very high fatality rate.

While the death rate from workplace accidents on American farms has declined in the first decades of the 21st century, grain-entrapment deaths have not, reaching an all-time annual high of 31 deaths in 2010. Many of those victims have been minors. Agricultural organizations have worked to protect them and improve rescue techniques, as well as spread awareness among farmers of prevention methods. Primary among these is a federal regulation that forbids opening an auger or other opening at the bottom of a grain storage facility while someone is known to be "walking down the grain" within.

Smaller family farms, however, are exempt from most federal labor regulation specific to agriculture, and no safety regulations govern children working for their parents. In 2011, the U.S. Department of Labor proposed sweeping new regulations that would have changed this, prohibiting underage workers from entering silos, among other provisions. They were withdrawn after protests from farmers and politicians of both U.S. parties.

== Occurrence ==
I don't even recall how high the corn was. It came down and got me with no warning. Too fast, too much, and I don't like remembering it.

— Bodie Blissett, Mississippi farm worker, on being entrapped in grain up to his neck

External videos
- Grain entrapment simulation with mannequin

At some grain-handling facilities, employees "walk down the grain" on top of it to expedite the flow of grain from the top when it is being allowed to flow out the bottom. This is the most common cause of grain entrapments. Regulations issued by the United States Occupational Safety and Health Administration (OSHA) specifically forbid this at larger commercial facilities subject to them; most smaller farms are not. It may also be necessary to enter a grain storage facility to remove damp, clumped grain (usually from early spoilage) stuck on the walls. Entrapments have also occurred to children in grain transportation vehicles, or to those outside when grain is released from a storage facility or next to large freestanding grain piles.

Workers in the grain can become entrapped in three different ways: an apparently stable surface may in fact be a "grain bridge" over an area beneath which the grain has already settled; a vertical mass of grain settled against a wall may suddenly give way while being cleared; moving grain will not support the weight of an average person.

Once entrapment begins, it happens very quickly due to the suction-like action of the grain. Researchers in Germany found that an average person who has sunk into grain once it has stopped flowing can get out only as long as it has not reached knee level; at waist level assistance is required. Once the grain has reached the chest a formal rescue effort must be undertaken.

Half of all entrapment victims eventually become engulfed. A human body in grain takes seconds to sink, minutes to suffocate, and hours to locate and recover. Recovered bodies have shown signs of blunt force trauma from the impact of the grain; one victim was found to have a dislocated jaw.

At a depth of 1.5 metres (5 ft), the lateral pressure of grain, as experimentally measured by load cells placed against bin walls, is 5–7 kilopascals (0.73–1.02 psi); at 12 metres (40 ft) it is 20–30 kPa (2.9–4.4 psi), which appears to be its maximum. While those pressures are less than water at equivalent depths, they are measurements of active pressure against bin walls rather than the passive pressure a body would experience, which is always greater. A victim trapped horizontally faces greater pressures, 30 kPa (4.4 psi) at 1.5 metres (5 ft) and 90 kPa (13 psi) at 12 metres (40 ft).

That pressure can make it difficult to breathe even when the victim's airway is unobstructed; it increases with every inhalation, making it more critical to secure breathing space for a victim in that situation. It has been likened to concrete, cement or quicksand; and described as making it impossible to even wiggle toes inside a shoe or boot; one survivor said he felt as if an "80,000-pound (36 t) semi truck had parked on [his] chest." The compression also makes it hard for blood to circulate, reducing the oxygen that gets to cells and increasing the amount of toxins in the system.

Suffocation rarely occurs from the weight of the grain, but rather from the grain itself. If a victim's airway remains unobstructed, or they find an air pocket within the grain, they may be able to keep breathing and be rescued; the 40–60% porosity of stored grain makes it at least theoretically possible. In one instance a trapped person was able to survive for three hours. In 2013 an Iowa man wearing a battery-powered mask that filtered out dust, a result of his asthma, was engulfed two feet (61 cm) below the surface of 22,000 US bushels (780 m^{3}) of corn in an 80,000-US-bushel (2,800 m^{3}) bin. The respirator mask enabled him to survive, drifting in and out of consciousness for five hours until he was rescued by draining the bin slowly after efforts to pull him through the rope he was attached to failed. At that time, his heart rate was 173 beats per minute, near his maximum; he was hospitalized for two days afterwards.

== Rescue ==
External videos
- Video from news report on unsuccessful rescue attempt in Indiana

Several factors complicate the rescue of entrapment victims even if their heads remain above the grain. Most grain storage and handling facilities are located on farms in rural areas, often distant from trained rescuers such as fire or ambulance services. They are also confined spaces, posing hazards to rescuers.

Foremost among them is the air within. Carbon dioxide or toxic gases, such as nitrogen oxides, accumulate from spoiling grain. They can cause asphyxiation in great enough concentrations without proper ventilation of the area. The dust can also sometimes have molds or spores that may be toxic or cause allergic reactions. There is at least one documented instance of a first responder requiring treatment as a result of such inhalation; rescuers are advised to wear at least dust masks or even self-contained breathing apparatus (SCBA).

North Dakota State University (NDSU) advises farmers that as soon as an entrapment occurs, in addition to immediately notifying local emergency services, the workers at the facility be required to shut off anything causing motion in the grain, or close any outlet. (Note: An adult human being takes up 2 1/2–3 bushels (88–106 L), meaning that any grain auger or similar device that moves grain at 100 US bushels (3.5 m^{3}) a minute will suck the entrapped person to the bottom of the grain very quickly due to their higher density.) Turning on the aeration fan, without any heat source activated, improves ventilation. NDSU warns rescuers to take care not to make the situation worse, and not to take action that would result in they themselves becoming entrapped or engulfed. Proper safety equipment, such as lifelines, is required for a rescue. Experts advise that no more than two should walk on the surface of the grain at any time.

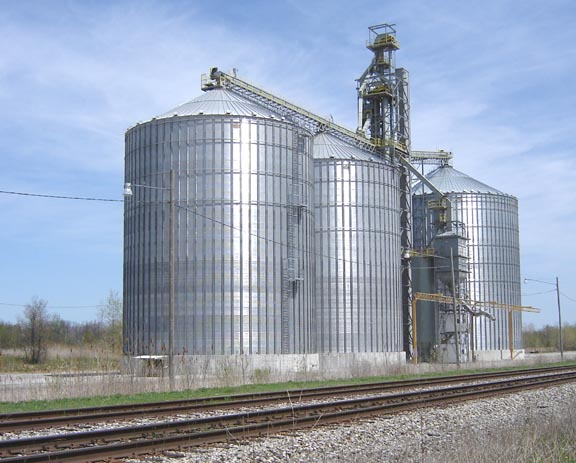
Most entrapments occur in grain bins similar to these.

Temperature extremes can cause problems for both rescuers and victims. Stored grain is often kept fresh by blowing dry air over it. This, combined with any moisture in the grain, can chill its core to 30 to 40 °F (−1 to 4 °C). (Note: Even without any additional cooling, the grain in the center of a column will usually be about 20 °F (10 °C) cooler than ambient temperature.) creating a risk of hypothermia for the victim, especially one fully engulfed. (Note: The thermal conductivity of stored grain has been measured at 0.10–0.12 BTU/(h⋅ft⋅°F) (0.16–0.20 W/(m⋅K))—more than air, but only a third that of cold water.) Conversely, the air within the bin may be warmer than usual due to the heat released by decaying grain, the lack of exterior ventilation (especially on hot days) and any rescue activity; there is thus a risk of heat illness for those trying to free the victim. During the five hours it took to rescue the man trapped in Iowa, it was estimated that temperatures in the bin reached 120 °F (49 °C), more than 30 °F (17 °C) above that day's reported high. Firefighters carrying out the rescue were monitored closely and made to take periodic breaks; even so, one experienced heat exhaustion.

Even if a living victim is roped, they cannot simply be removed that way. Grain creates friction that resists the force used to pull them out. It requires 400 pounds-force (1.8 kN) to lift a victim buried up to their waist; removing a human completely trapped in grain takes 900 pounds-force (4.0 kN). These forces are above the level that can cause permanent spinal column injury. (Note: Purdue's Agricultural Entrapment Database records one incident where a fatal spinal injury was inflicted during a rescue attempt.) Some rescue attempts using ropes connected to tractors to pull victims out have resulted in separated shoulders.

Rescues of an entrapped victim usually entail building makeshift retaining walls in the grain around them with plywood, sheet metal, tarpaulins, snow fences or any other similar material available. Once that has been done, the next step is creating the equivalent of a cofferdam within the grain from which grain can then be removed by hand, shovel, grain vacuum or other extraction equipment. Purpose-built plastic grain rescue tubes are also available for this purpose; using them causes an increase in pressure around the victim, possibly by increasing the bulk density of the grain within the tube, which in turn requires more force to pull them out until the grain surrounding them is removed.

While some of these techniques have been used to retrieve engulfed victims or their bodies as well, in those cases it is also common to cut a hole, or attempt to, in the side of the storage facility; this requires consulting an engineer to make sure it can be done without compromising the facility's structural integrity; usually by cutting high up and in a uniform pattern around the side of the bin. It is also possible that this can suck the trapped person deeper into the grain. (Note: In one incident that researchers from Purdue personally witnessed, a rescue attempt led to confrontations between the farm family and staff and firefighters, as the former thought the latter were taking too much time to come up with a plan, and took it upon themselves to cut further openings in the bin, which the fire department's incident commander had asked them not to do. These conflicts had to be resolved by law enforcement on the scene; eventually the victim's body was recovered at the bottom of the bin.) This appears to be most effective in facilities with a capacity of 20,000 US bushels (700 m^{3}) or less. There is also the possibility of a dust explosion, although none are known to have occurred yet during a rescue attempt.

Survivors of grain entrapment also may require treatment. Many develop painful contusions from the pressure of the grain they were confined in; it is not uncommon for them to lose consciousness due to the drop in blood pressure as circulation returns to normal. Glenn Blahey, president of the Canadian Agricultural Safety Association (CASA), recalls one incident where a man rescued from a Manitoba grain bin had to be immediately hospitalized as he went into a coma for several days afterwards due to the toxins that had built up in his bloodstream as a result of the oxygen deprivation that occurred during the hours it took to rescue him.

Rescued victims have also experienced psychological issues. The survivor of a 2010 Illinois entrapment that killed both his coworkers experienced survivor guilt, with accompanying insomnia, and turned to heavy alcohol and marijuana use to deal with it. Feeling himself to be his town's "Bubble Boy", he did not return to work at the facility where it happened, instead taking a job at a local grocery across the street from the bin he was entrapped in, where the holes cut during the rescue were still visible. A Brazilian entrapment survivor says he was fired by his employer after refusing to return to work in the bins and asking to be assigned elsewhere in the company's operations.

== Prevention ==
The best way to prevent grain entrapments is zero entry: the near or complete elimination of any reasons to enter a grain storage facility. This can be accomplished primarily by storing grain properly. If kept at the proper moisture level of 14 percent or less and protected from the elements, grain will not form the kind of clumps that create grain bridges or other areas of unequal density within and require clearance.

Entrapments are more likely when grain is more spoiled. "Coring" grain by removing some of it from the center after the facility has been filled also reduces spoilage since it generally takes the broken and smaller grains where insects tend to grow within. The University of Iowa's Great Plains Center for Agricultural Health (GPCAH) advises that any clearing of clumped grain be done from outside using a long pole.

Strict policies about entering the area where grain is stored, should that be absolutely necessary, would further prevent entrapments, according to GPCAH. Foremost among them is a requirement that all gas levels be checked prior to entry. Levels of oxygen outside 19–23 percent, carbon monoxide above 25 ppm, hydrogen sulfide above 10 ppm and phosphine above 0.3 ppm, or odors associated with rotting or burning grain, or a chemical smell, indicate that there may be considerable spoilage and entry poses too great a hazard.

Purdue's experts warn that workers should not be alone, unless they have a radio or cell phone to communicate. Signs indicating the potential hazard at the entry are strongly advised, as well as a rule that anyone who does not have a good reason to be in the grain should not be there. To minimize entrapment, employers can implement training programs for working inside bins if it is necessary and make sure only those who have been trained do that work; they should also have a plan in place for how to respond to an entrapment, GPCAH suggests.

OSHA's regulations require that employees who enter stored grain do so attached to either a lifeline or boatswain's chair, that one other employee be assigned to observe them, and that rescue equipment adequate to the task be available. At farms and feedlots not subject to those regulations, it is sometimes common to tie a permanent lifeline to the inside of the storage facility. This has not been found to be effective, as the grain's suction often pulls the victim under the surface too fast for them to reach it, and most are not secured firmly enough to prevent failure under the load.

=== Education ===
Agricultural safety advocates use different means to warn farmers of the danger of grain entrapment, since they believe many underestimate the risks despite having almost experienced it themselves. Many agricultural organizations and schools, as well as government agencies, publish and disseminate grain safety information, both as documents and videos, on the Internet and off. In 2019 the Illinois-based Grain Handling Safety Coalition produced SILO, a short dramatic feature film telling the story of a fictional entrapment and successful rescue of a farm family's teenage son.

Several organizations have developed a mobile grain entrapment simulator, used for both training and educational purposes in the US and Canada. In it, a human volunteer can be strapped into place and experience both how quickly they can sink into grain without risk of becoming entrapped themselves, and how effectively the grain constrains their motions, even breathing, when they do, afterwards. "A brochure is words on paper and no opportunity to ask and answer questions", says CASA's Blahey. "A face-to-face presentation is more realistic."

Researchers in the field have called for those demonstrations to use only mannequins, however, noting that some training exercises have inadvertently turned into actual rescue operations. In 2018 several of them wrote an editorial for the Journal of Agricultural Safety and Health condemning the practice of allowing children to volunteer for demonstrations, which they had personally observed on several occasions. "Each youth was in a position [where] a simple human error could ha[ve] resulted in suffocation with dozens of first responders present who would have been nearly helpless to extricate the victim in a timely manner," they wrote. "We don't use youth as automotive crash dummies, drop them off the deep end of the pool to test the capabilities of lifeguards, or test the effectiveness of ROPS by putting youth inside the cab and rolling the tractor down a hillside. That is the purpose of mannequins or test dummies."

OSHA regulations specifically forbid the use of minors in such demonstrations for training purposes, the editorial notes. Likewise, the institutional review boards of many research institutions would not permit the use of live subjects of any age in grain entrapment research. (Note: The authors of a 2015 paper on the efficacy of grain rescue tubes similarly noted that the 1971 German paper which established, through research with human subjects, that a victim entrapped up to waist level needs a formal rescue as others who might attempt to remove them would not be permitted under today's standards.) The authors also took note of the likelihood that in the event of an injury or death arising from such an educational setting gone wrong, all involved would be held liable in a lawsuit.

== Statistical trends ==
Since 1978, the Agricultural Health and Safety Program at Purdue University in Indiana has documented grain-entrapment incidents. Its National Agricultural Confined Space Incident Database has, as of 2019, records on 1,225 reported entrapments from 1964 onward. The program has analyzed them to find consistent patterns in the hope of improving prevention and rescue efforts. Among the statistically significant patterns it has found are the type of grain in which incidents predominantly occur, the geographic locations of incidents, the type of facility they occur in and the demographics of victims.

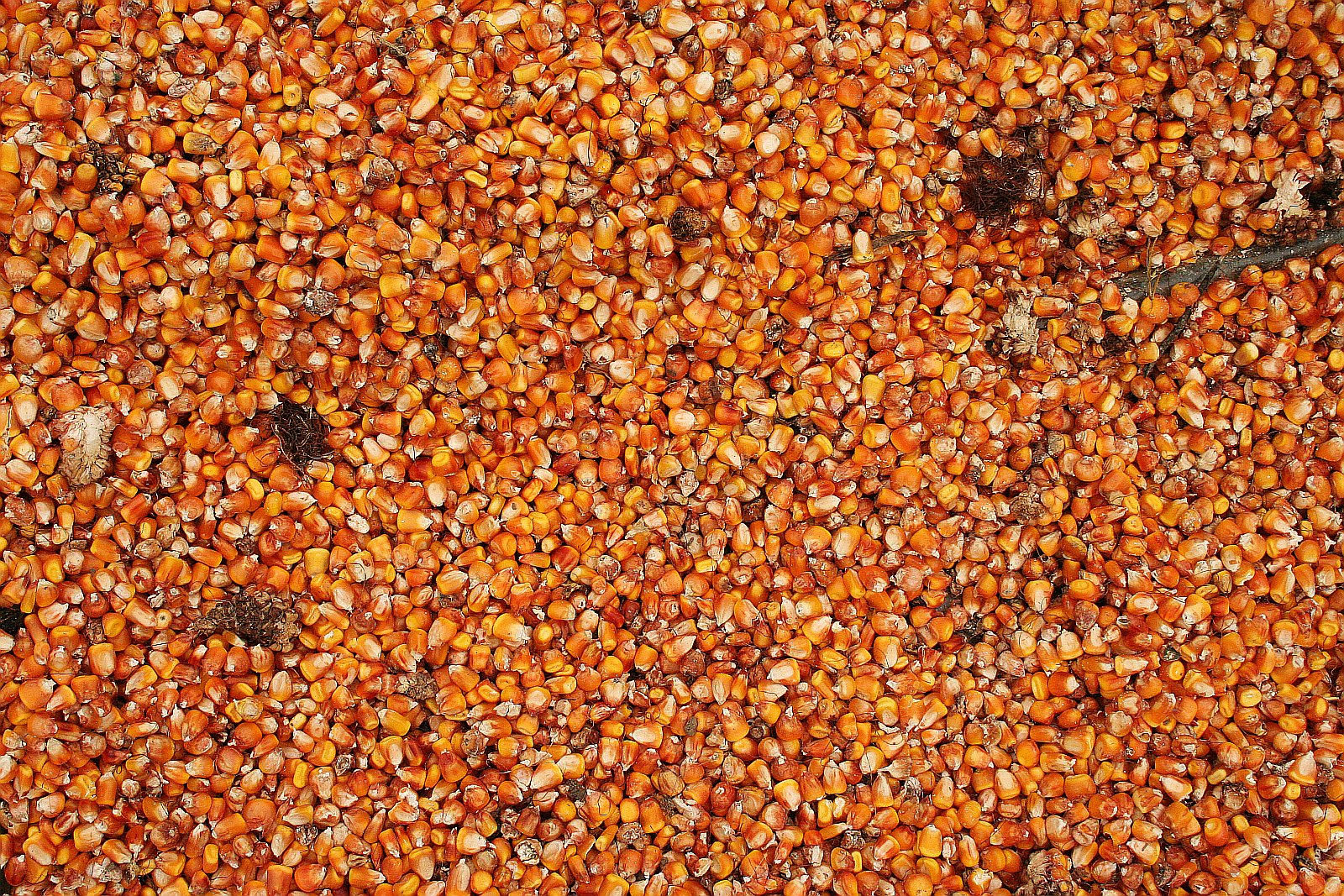
Most recorded grain entrapments have occurred in corn.

More than half the recorded entrapments and engulfments have occurred in corn, and overwhelmingly corn stored in bins. Other grains in which victims have become entrapped include soybeans, oats, wheat, flax and canola. Given the predominance of corn as an entrapment medium, most incidents occur in the Corn Belt states (Illinois, Indiana, Iowa, Minnesota and Ohio) where that grain is grown and stored in quantity. Iowa has had the most accidents in some years, but Indiana has the most total with 165 as of 2019. The Purdue researchers attribute that to more extensive efforts to document those incidents in that state; based on annual grain production and storage capacity not only Iowa but Illinois and Minnesota probably have more.

Farms in states in the Upper Midwest and West, where humidity is lower and smaller grains are preferred, report fewer incidents. Over 70 percent of entrapments have occurred on small or family farms of the type exempt from OSHA grain-handling regulations, which account for two-thirds of U.S. grain storage capacity.

Recorded victims were exclusively male until 2018, when a minor died in a grain wagon at her family's farm. Three-quarters of them have been farmers, farm workers, or members of farm families. The average age of victims is in the 40s, but a disproportionate share are under 18 (youths 16 or older can work in agriculture without any restrictions). Statistics on ages of victims may be misleading, as the Purdue researchers note that in 21 of 2018's 30 reported entrapment incidents, the age of the person trapped was not given. According to Purdue professor Bill Field, entrapments in vehicles are particularly devastating for farm families, as 95 percent of the 140 deaths that occurred that way were boys under the age of 11.

In 2010, the researchers noted that 38 incidents had occurred during 2009, when the national corn harvest set a new record. This was not only the highest since 1993, it capped a period in which the five-year average had steadily increased. This rose to a record-setting 51 in 2010, when a similarly large corn harvest had a high moisture content and low test weight. Observers speculate that the demand for ethanol fuel production has fostered the increase of corn in storage. The record entrapments ran counter to the trend of declining accidents in agriculture.

At the same time, more victims are being rescued. Before 2005, a quarter of the victims were saved. Since then, the rate has improved to half. In 2011, when entrapments declined to 27, only eight resulted in fatalities.

=== Outside the U.S. ===
In Canada, CASA's Canadian Agricultural Injury Reporting system recorded 29 grain-related suffocation deaths between 1990 and 2008; however, the organization believes there were likely more due to the paucity of information available. In 2015, it counted six deaths, including three sisters in central Alberta who were buried in canola seed while playing in a grain truck on their family's farm as it was being loaded, and two rescues, based purely on media reports. CASA president Blahey told The Western Producer in 2017 that he believes there are three or four deaths annually across Canada from grain entrapment. "We never know about close calls because they're not reported."

Grain entrapment deaths occur all over the world. A 2018 BBC Brasil report found that since 2009, the latter half of a period in which that country had been rapidly increasing its grain production and storage capacity, 109 farmworkers had died while working in grain storage facilities, most of them after being buried by the material therein, usually soybeans. That death rate makes that work one of the most likely to result in death on the job after occupations where traffic accidents are a possibility, and in the uppermost quartile overall. While the dead were mostly workers, at least one rescuer asphyxiated on the gases that had accumulated in the facility; another was a woman bringing food to her husband while he worked. Several children also died. The state of Mato Grosso, which produces most of Brazil's grain, had 28 grain entrapment deaths during that period, the highest among the 13 states that record this information; within Mato Grosso, the municipality of Sorriso had the most, with seven.

In a 2017 accident in China's Shandong province, six workers died in a grain avalanche. Elsewhere, a German farmworker died after being buried up to his chest in corn, a crop grown there in large amounts only since the 1960s, while cleaning a silo in 2008. In 1997, a 14-year-old British student doing a work placement on a farm died after falling into wheat as it was being drained from a silo. U.K. statistics record four cases of grain entrapment among the 336 agricultural deaths it notes between 2005 and 2015; Purdue identifies 16 in that period.

Seven grain entrapment deaths were reported in Australia between 1991 and 2010, with one in New Zealand. Purdue's data base identifies three deaths in Ireland, two in South Africa and one apiece in Saudi Arabia, Spain and Sweden.

== 2011 proposed U.S. regulations ==
After a 2010 entrapment at a commercial grain elevator complex in Illinois killed two workers aged 14 and 19, while a third survived with injuries, OSHA assessed fines of over half a million dollars against the operators (eventually collecting little over a quarter-million). It sent letters to other grain-handling facilities afterwards reminding them of their legal and moral obligations to prevent such deaths. A year later, after another incident in Oklahoma where two teenaged boys lost legs to a sweep auger, the agency proposed new rules on child labor in agriculture.

They were the most extensive changes proposed in that area in a half-century. Most minors working in agriculture work for farms with fewer than ten employees, which are exempt from most federal workplace-safety laws and regulations. Children who work on their parents' farm are completely outside the scope of those laws. The proposed regulations, which took up 49 pages in the Federal Register, would have changed that. In its preface to the proposed regulations, the department noted that while agriculture employs only 4 percent of the country's underage workers, those workers account for 40 percent of overall deaths on the job.

The proposed rules drew opposition as well. While they preserved the exemption for small family farms, some observers argued they had overreached in scope and would prevent children of farm families from learning important skills. Some family members of teenage boys who had died in entrapments opposed them. Congressional opponents worried that they would prevent children from doing chores on their parents' farms. Several Democratic senators from rural states facing hotly contested elections, such as Jon Tester, Claire McCaskill and Debbie Stabenow, let President Barack Obama know they did not support the changes.

In 2012, the Labor Department withdrew them, taking the unusual step of indicating, as it did so, that "this regulation will not be pursued for the duration of the Obama administration." Instead, the department said it would continue to work with youth-oriented agricultural organizations like the 4-H and Future Farmers of America to increase awareness of safe work practices on farms. It has also begun levying more and heavier fines for safety violations.

== See also ==
- Occupational hazards of grain facilities
