= Grain =

Edible dry seed

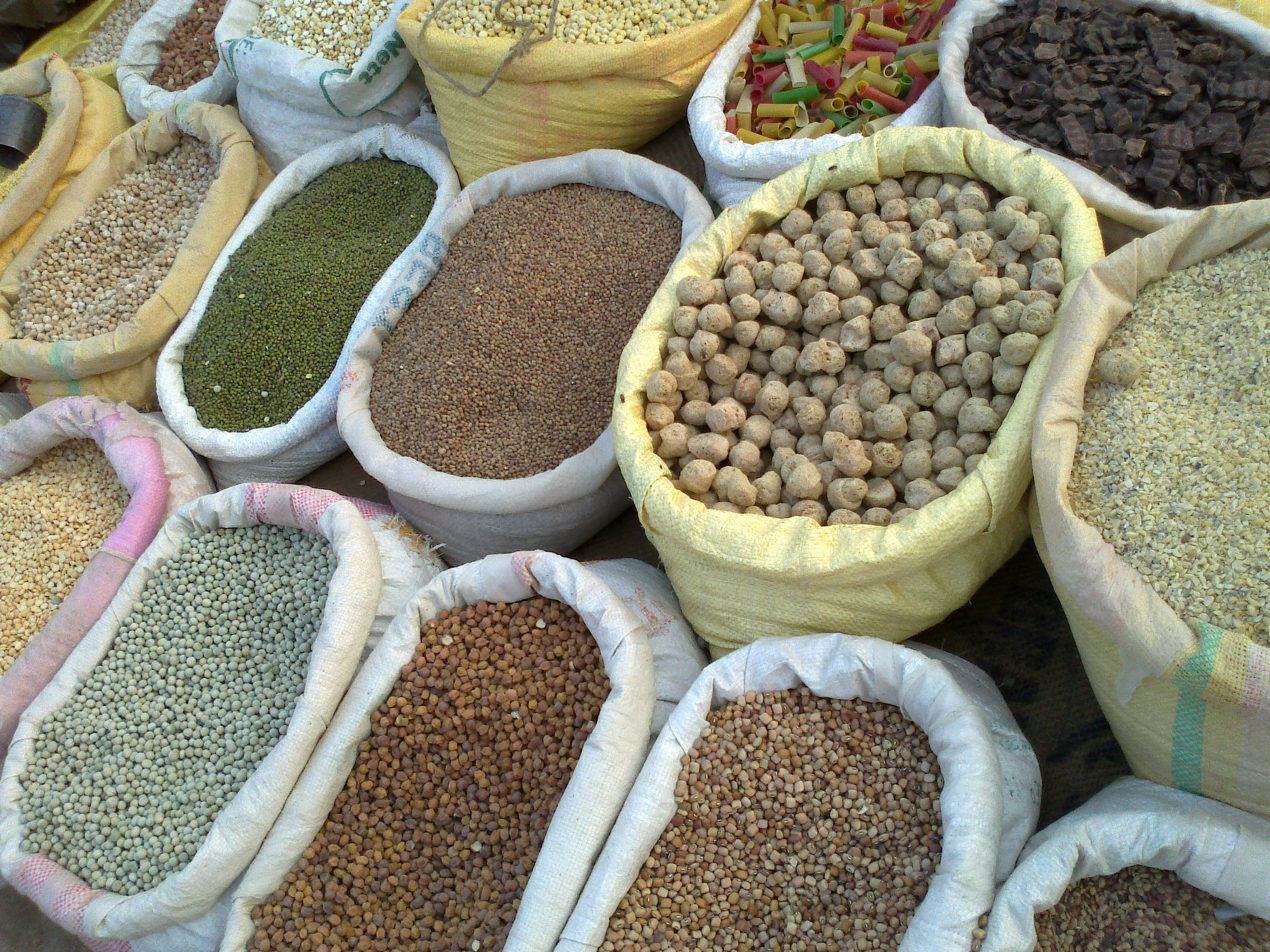
Various food grains at a market in India

A grain is a small, hard, dry fruit (caryopsis)–with or without an attached hull layer–harvested for human or animal consumption. A grain crop is a grain-producing plant. The two main types of commercial grain crops are cereals and legumes.

After being harvested, dry grains are more durable than other staple foods, such as starchy fruits (plantains, breadfruit, etc.) and tubers (sweet potatoes, cassava, and more).This durability has made grains well suited to industrial agriculture, since they can be mechanically harvested, transported by rail or ship, stored for long periods in silos, and milled for flour or pressed for oil. The grain market is a major global agricultural market that includes crops such as maize, rice, soybeans, wheat, and other grains.

== Cereal and non-cereal grains ==
In the grass family, a grain (narrowly defined) is a caryopsis, a fruit with its wall fused on to the single seed inside, belonging to a cereal such as wheat, maize, or rice. More broadly, in agronomy and commerce, seeds or fruits from other plant families are called grains if they resemble cereal caryopses. For example, amaranth is sold as "grain amaranth", and amaranth products may be described as "whole grains". The pre-Columbian civilizations of the Andes had grain-based food systems, but at higher elevations none of the grains belonged the cereal family. All three grains native to the Andes (kaniwa, kiwicha, and quinoa) are broad-leaved plants rather than grasses.

== Cereal grains ==
Many different species of cereal are cultivated for their grains.

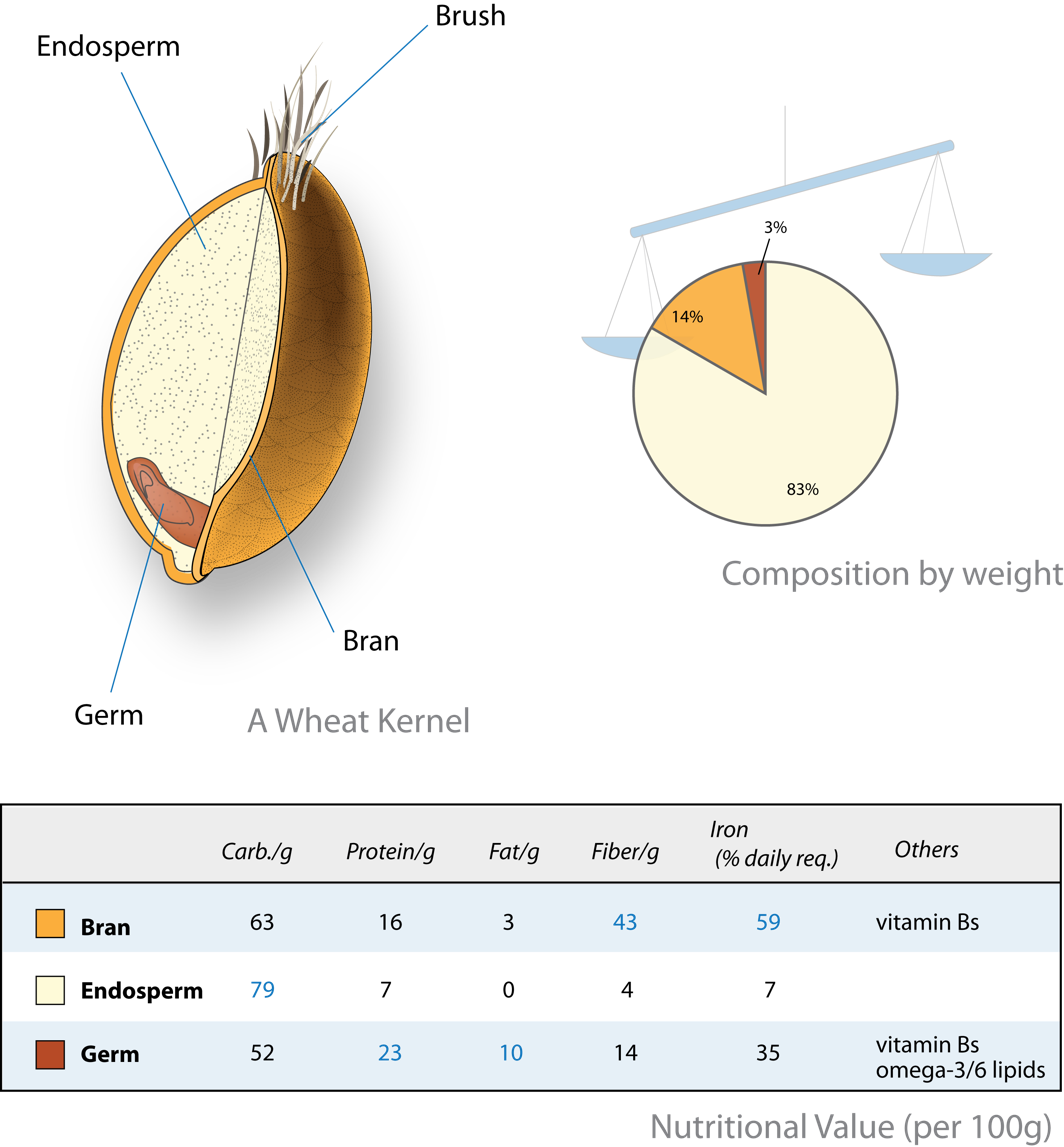
A wheat kernel, its composition and the nutritional values of its parts.

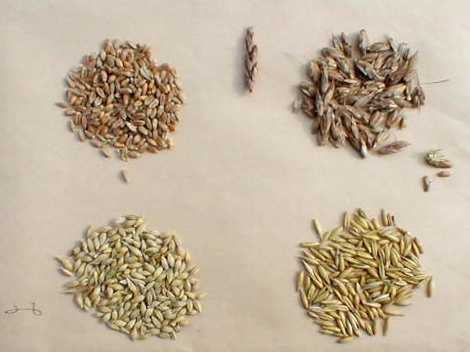
Cereal grain seeds clockwise from top-left: wheat, spelt, oat, barley

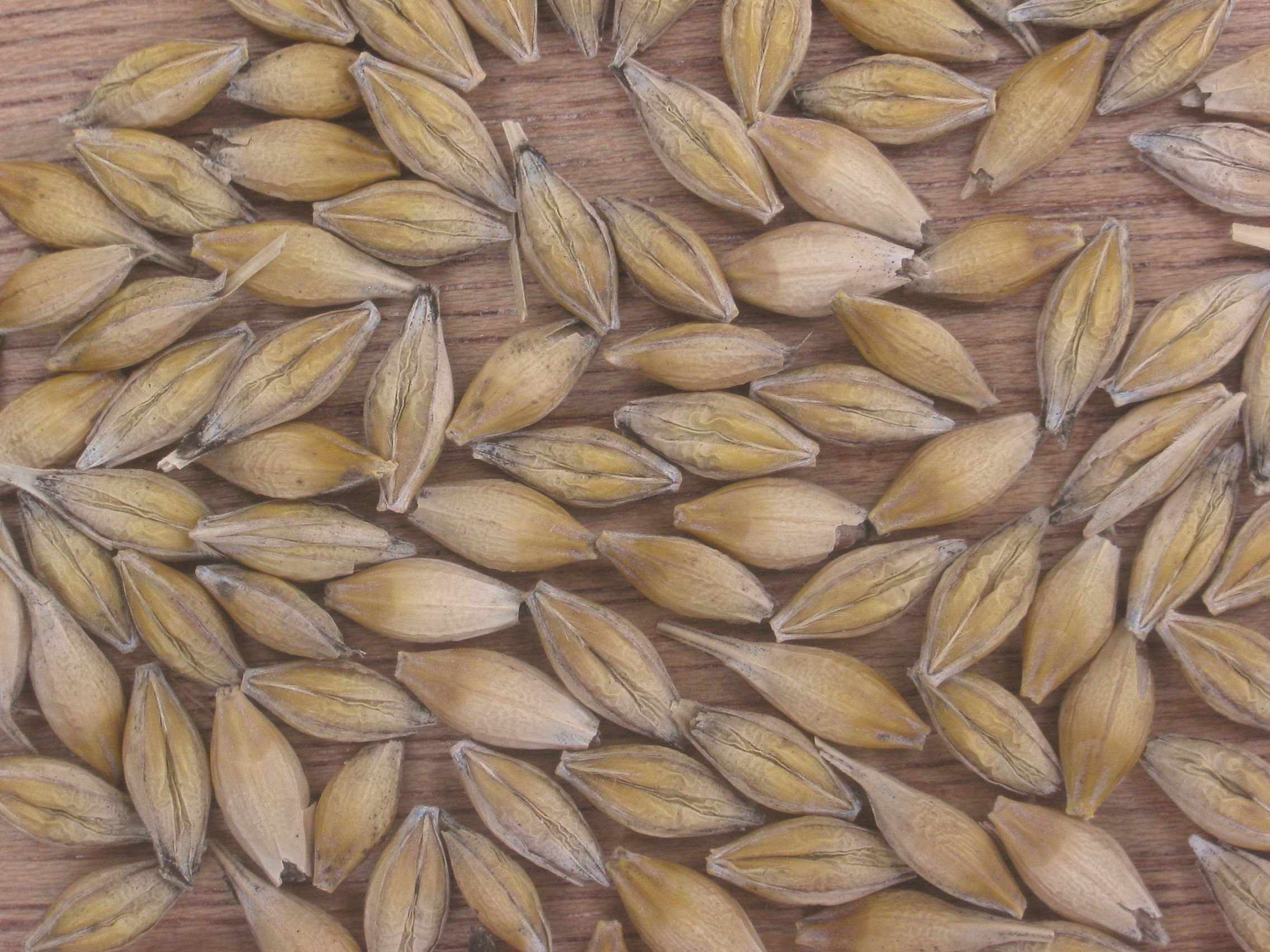
Barley

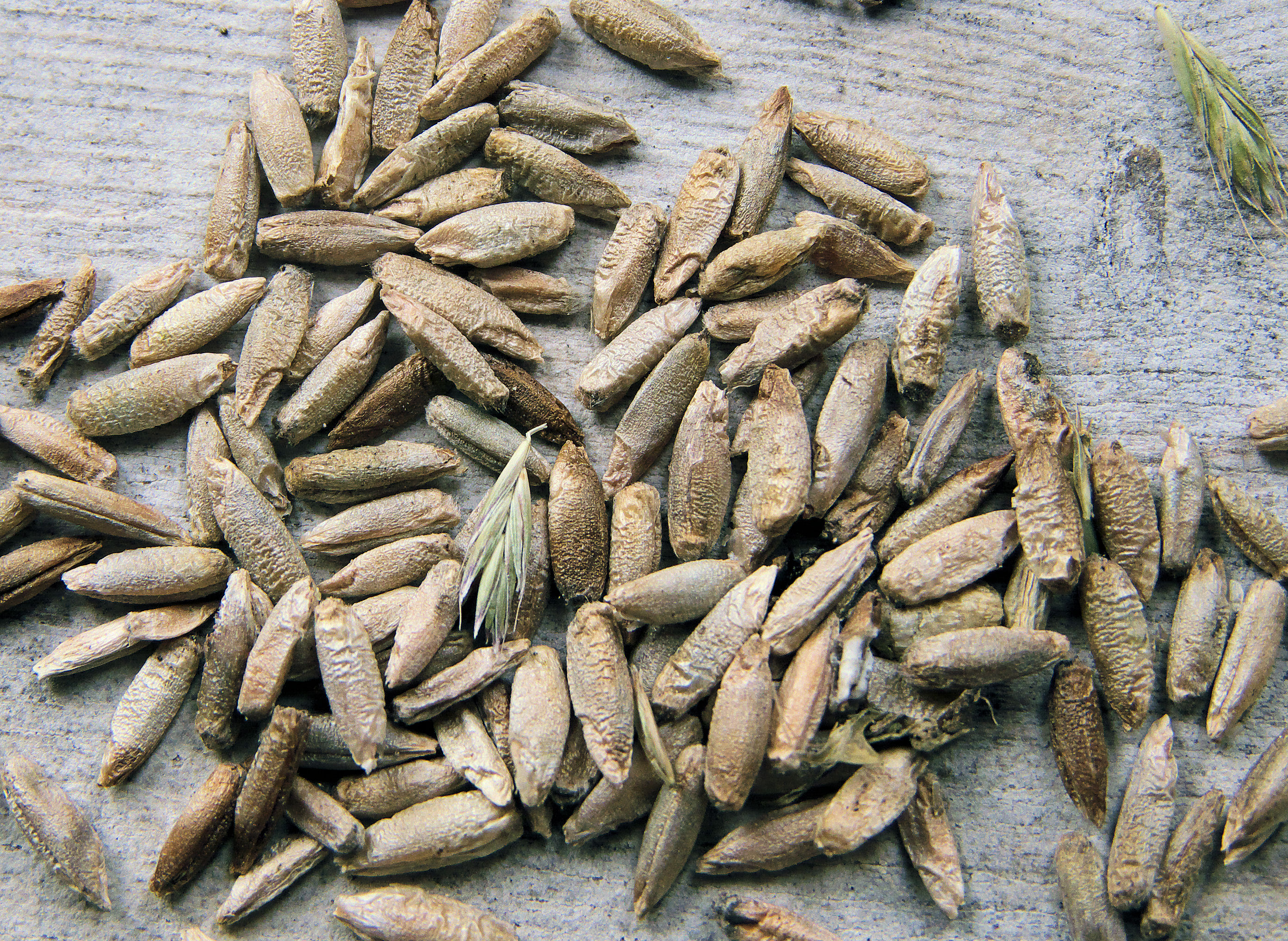
Rye

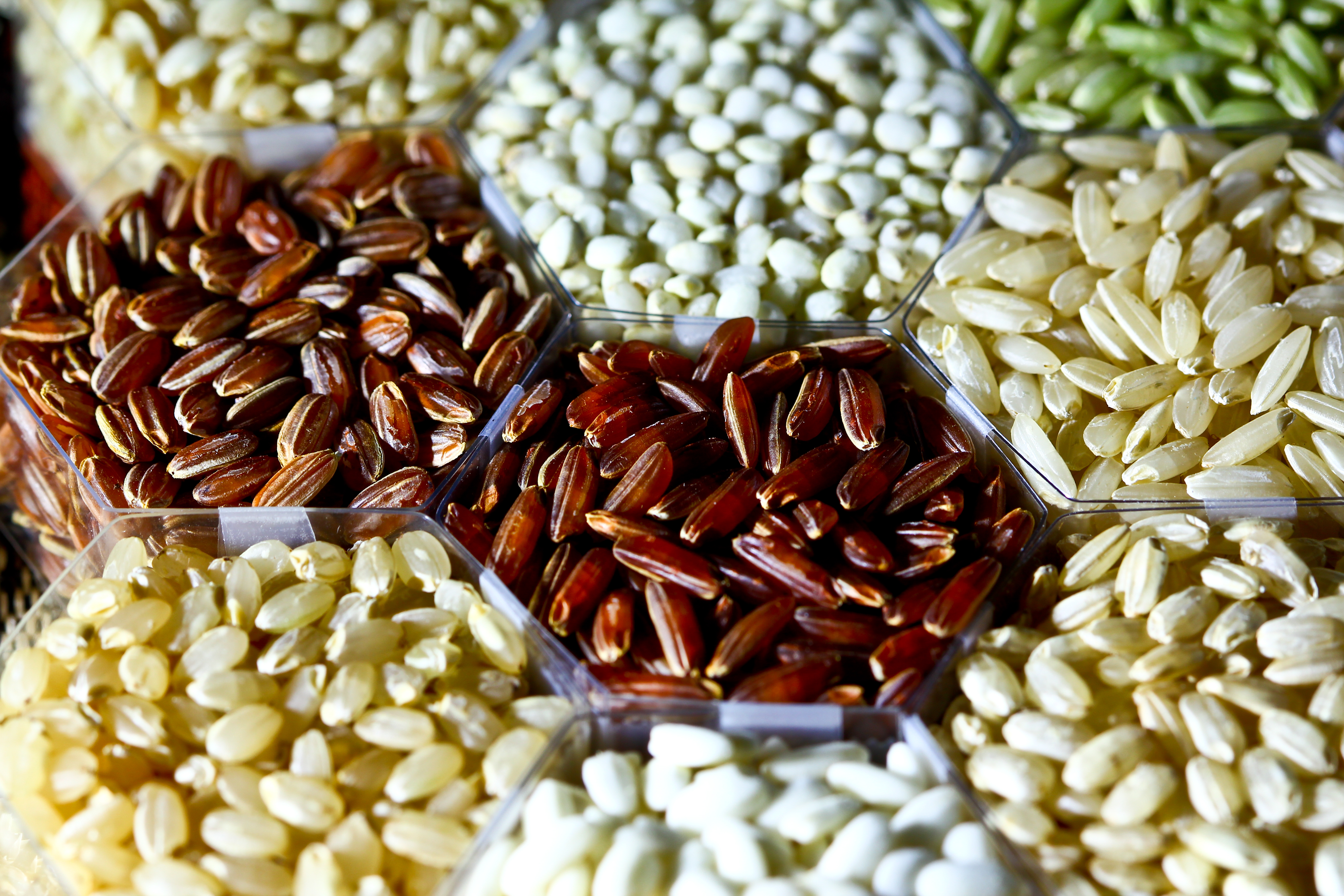
Rice grains

=== Warm-season cereals ===
- fonio
- maize (corn)
- millets (of multiple species)
- sorghum

=== Cool-season cereals ===
- barley
- oats
- rice
- rye
- spelt
- teff
- triticale
- wheat
- wild rice

== Pseudocereal grains ==
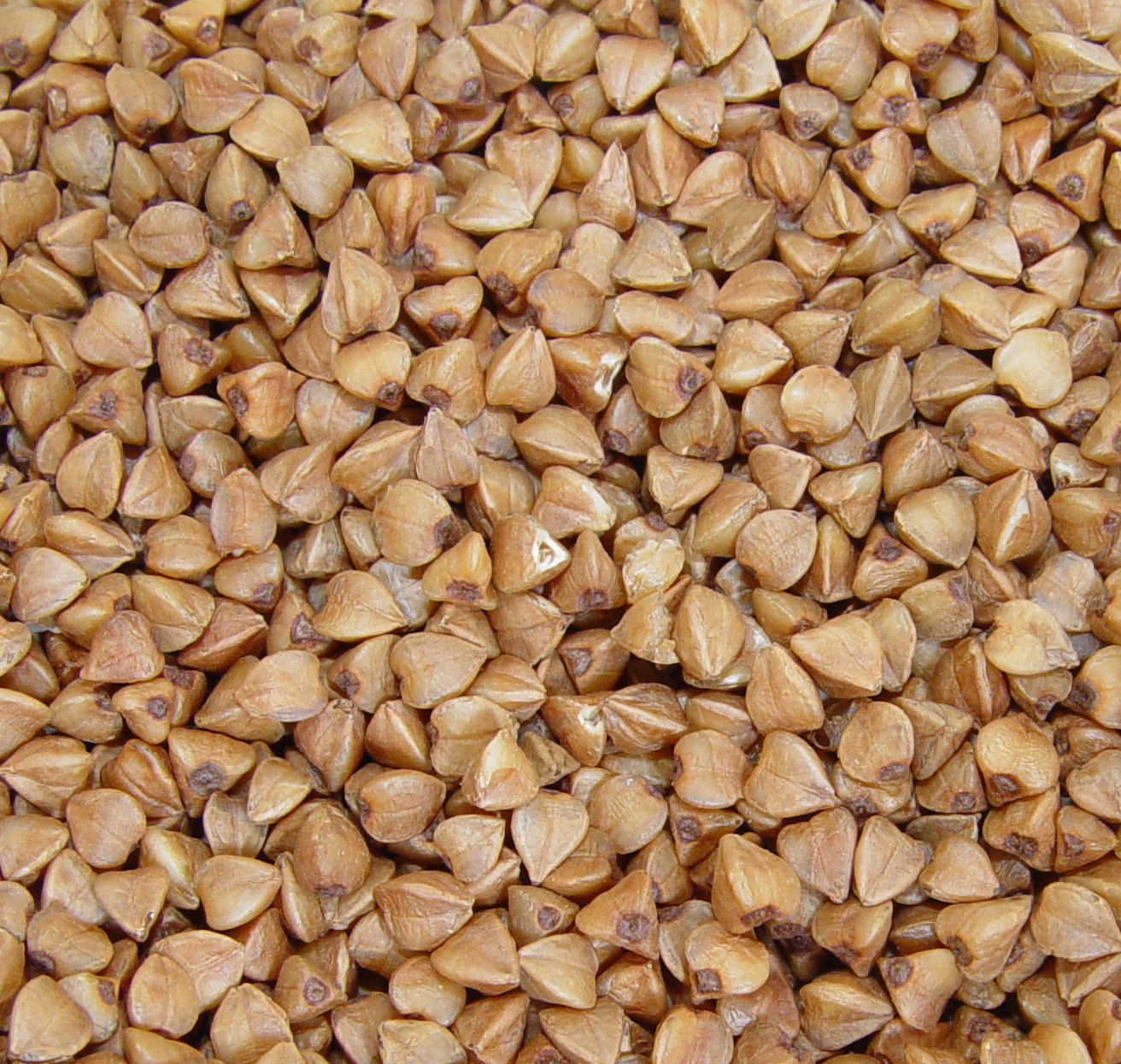
Buckwheat

Starchy grains from broadleaf (dicot) plant families are cultivated as nutritious alternatives to cereals. The three major pseudocereal grains are:

- amaranth (Amaranth family) also called kiwicha
- buckwheat (Smartweed family)
- quinoa (Amaranth family, formerly classified as Goosefoot family)

== Pulses or grain legumes ==
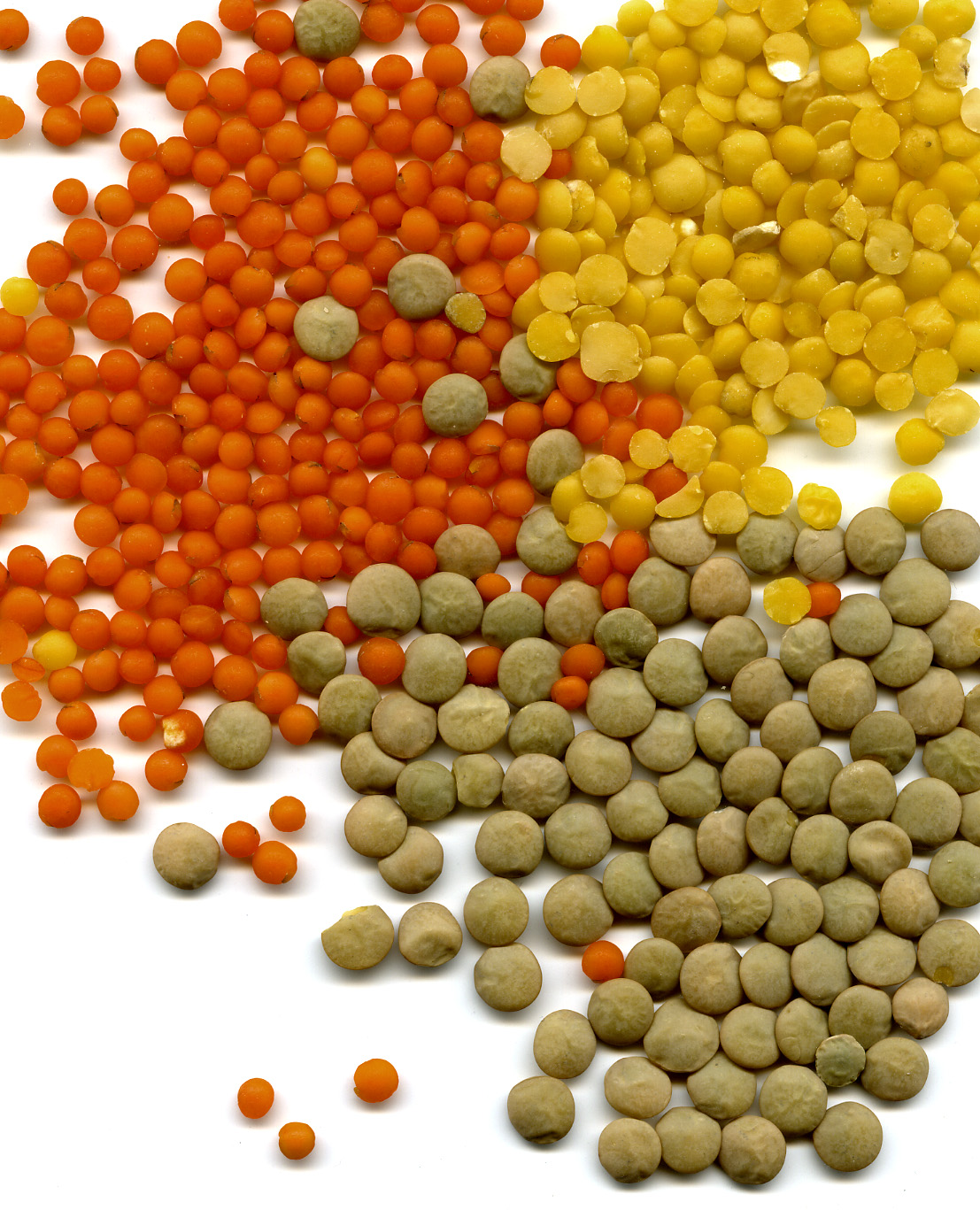
Lentil, a pulse or grain legume

Pulses (the dried seeds of legumes, members of the pea family), have a higher protein content than most other plant foods, at around 20%, while soybeans have as much as 35%. As is the case with all other whole plant foods, pulses also contain carbohydrates and fat. Common pulses include:

- chickpeas
- common beans
- common peas (garden peas)
- fava beans
- lentils
- lima beans
- lupins
- green gram
- black gram
- peanuts
- pigeon peas
- runner beans
- soybeans

== Oilseed grains ==
Oilseed grains are grown primarily for the extraction of their edible oil. Vegetable oils provide dietary energy and some essential fatty acids. They are also used as fuel and lubricants.

=== Mustard family ===
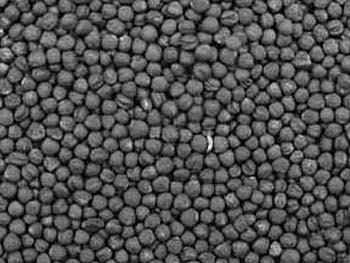
Rapeseed

- black mustard
- India mustard
- rapeseed (including canola)

=== Aster family ===
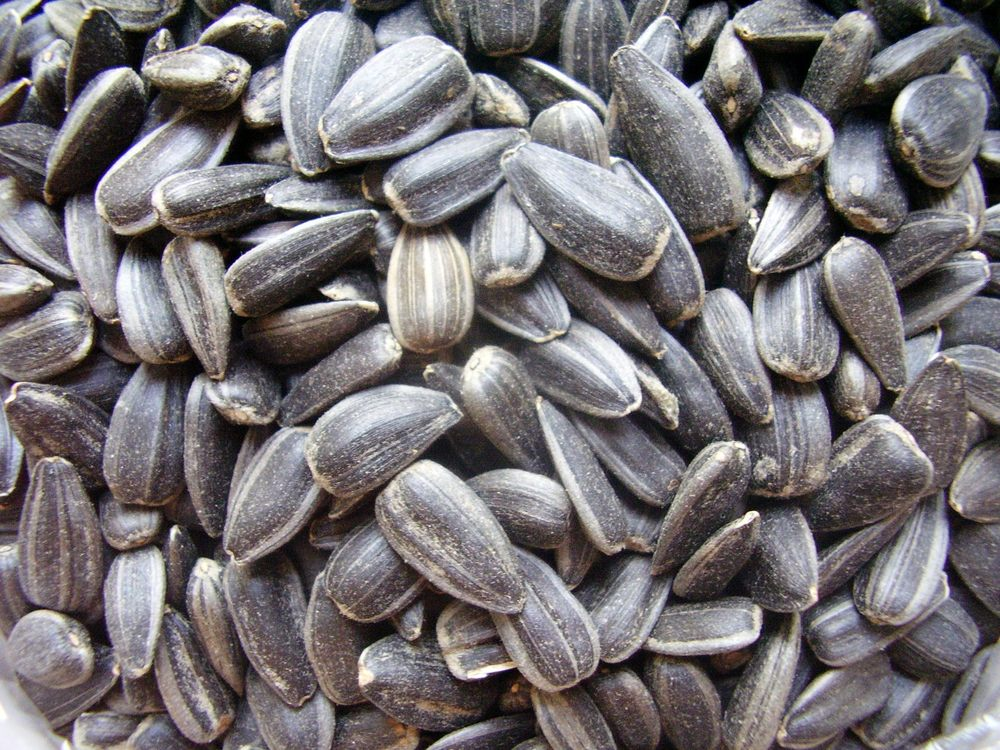
Sunflower seeds

- safflower
- sunflower seed

=== Other families ===
- flax seed (Flax family)
- hemp seed (Hemp family)
- poppy seed (Poppy family)

== Historical importance ==
Because grains are small, hard and dry, they can be stored, measured, and transported more readily than can other kinds of food crops such as fresh fruits, roots and tubers. The development of grain agriculture allowed excess food to be produced and stored easily which could have led to the creation of the first temporary settlements and the division of society into classes.

This assumption that grain agriculture led to early settlements and social stratification has been challenged by James C. Scott in his book Against the Grain. He argues that the transition from hunter-gatherer societies to settled agrarian communities was not a voluntary choice driven by the benefits of increased food production due to the long storage potential of grains, but rather that the shift towards settlements was a coerced transformation imposed by dominant members of a society seeking to expand control over labor and resources.

== Trade ==
The grain trade refers to the local and international trade in cereals such as wheat, barley, maize, rice, and other food grains. Grain is an important trade item because it is easily stored and transported with limited spoilage, unlike other agricultural products. Healthy grain supply and trade is important to many societies, providing a caloric base for most food systems as well as important role in animal feed for animal agriculture.

The grain trade began as early as agricultural settlement, identified in many of the early cultures that adopted sedentary farming. Major societal changes have been directly connected to the grain trade, such as the fall of the Roman Empire. From the early modern period onward, grain trade has been an important part of colonial expansion and foreign policy. The geopolitical dominance of countries like Australia, the United States, Canada, and the Soviet Union during the 20th century was connected with their status as grain surplus countries.

More recently, international commodity markets have been an important part of the dynamics of food systems and grain pricing. Speculation, as well as other compounding production and supply factors leading up to the 2008 financial crisis, created rapid inflation of grain prices during the 2007–2008 world food price crisis. More recently, the dominance of Ukraine and Russia in grain markets such as wheat meant that the Russian invasion of Ukraine in 2022 caused increased fears of a global food crisis in 2022. Changes to agriculture caused by climate change are expected to have cascading effects on global grain markets.

== Occupational safety and health ==
Those who handle grain at grain facilities may encounter numerous occupational hazards and exposures. Risks include grain entrapment, where workers are submerged in the grain and unable to extricate themselves and dust explosions caused by fine particles of grain dust.

== See also ==
- Domestication
- Grain drying
- List of dried foods
- Mycoestrogen
- Perennial grain
- Staple foods
- Vegetable fats and oils
- Gluten
