= National Poisons Information Service =

English-based information service

- Abbreviation: NPIS
- Formation: 1963
- Type: Government agency
- Purpose: Toxicological advice for UK hospitals
- Location(s): Birmingham, Cardiff, Edinburgh and Newcastle
- Region served: UK and Ireland
- Members: British toxicologists
- Main organ: NPIS Clinical Standards Group
- Parent organization: UK Health Security Agency (formerly Public Health England)
- Affiliations: TOXBASE database, Advisory Council on the Misuse of Drugs, Chemicals Regulation Directorate
- Website: NPIS

The National Poisons Information Service is a poison control centre commissioned originally by Public Health England, and currently by the UK Health Security Agency as its successor agency, on behalf of the UK health departments. Poisoning accounts for 1% of NHS admissions. Pesticides used in agriculture (particularly organophosphorus insecticides) are extremely toxic, but 87% of around 120,000 annual poisoning cases in the UK take place in the home.

== History ==
In August 1962 the Ministry of Health announced it was forming a poisons information service following the publication of the Emergency Treatment in Hospital of Cases of Acute Poisoning report by the Central Health Services Council in March 1962 which recommended such a service. Many more household chemicals were on the market, and the chemical composition was only known to the manufacturers. 4,000 to 5,000 people each year were lethally poisoned, with 6,085 in 1962; however, many of the deaths were (non-accidental) suicides.

It started in 1963 by Dr Roy Goulding at the Medical Toxicology Unit of Guy's Hospital, with a staff of 65. By the late 1960s, recreational drugs were presenting a widespread danger. Other centres were soon set up in Edinburgh, Belfast and Cardiff.

In 1995, the service took on the National Teratology Information Centre (itself having been founded in 1983 at St Thomas' Hospital in London), today known as the UK Teratology Information Service, responsible for advising on the safety of medications during pregnancy and breastfeeding.

== Structure ==
It has four units in Birmingham, Cardiff, Edinburgh and Newcastle. It is a member of the European Association of Poisons Centres and Clinical Toxicologists.

- NPIS Birmingham Unit (West Midlands Poisons Unit), City Hospital, Birmingham - Dr Sally Bradberry
- NPIS Cardiff Unit, Llandough Hospital - Dr Laurence Gray
- NPIS Edinburgh Unit (Scottish Poisons Information Bureau), Royal Infirmary of Edinburgh - Dr. Aravindan Veiraiah.
- NPIS Newcastle Unit, Regional Drug and Therapeutics Centre, Newcastle University - Professor Simon Thomas

NPIS Birmingham has the NPIS Product Data Centre, provided by manufacturer's information, and deals with around 2,300 companies.

NPIS supports (24 hours) NHS Direct (for England and Wales) and (24 hours) NHS 24 for Scotland. Northern Ireland has its Northern Ireland Regional Medicines and Poisons Information Service in Belfast, and NPIS is used when this is not available. The Republic of Ireland uses the service, via the TOXBASE database, which is used by the country's National Poisons Information Centre.

Of all UK nations, Wales has the highest proportionate number of enquiries to the service, with Northern Ireland the fewest. Within England, there is a distribution of higher number of enquiries to the service in the north than the south, with NHS North East having the highest and NHS South of England having the least proportionate number of enquiries. The vast majority (95%) of enquiries come from A&E departments. Around 65% of poisoning is from pharmaceuticals (paracetamol, ibuprofen, citalopram, diazepam and zopiclone) and 15% from household chemicals (detergents, bleach, and isopropanol). There are very dangerous chemicals stored in most UK kitchens.

Wednesday is the busiest day of the week for enquiries, with the fewest at the weekend.

== Function ==
The NPIS operates a 24-hour telephone advice service and internet database TOXBASE (www.toxbase.org for registered healthcare departments only). TOXBASE is free for UK NHS departments, and available by subscription to departments outside the UK NHS. The TOXBASE app is also available for Apple and Android devices. The app is free for individual NHS users.

The TOXBASE database contains information on approximately 17,000 products, together with generic advice on the management of poisoning. In excess of 1.5 million product accesses are made to the database each year. Most of the accesses are made by A&E staff. TOXBASE is not available for public access, and much of its information is exempt from disclosure under the Freedom of Information Act 2000.

NHS 111, NHS 24 and NHS Direct all use the TOXBASE database. In the UK poisons information can also be found in the British National Formulary.

== See also ==
- College of Emergency Medicine
- DrugScope
- Porton Down
