= Grain damage =

Grain damage is any degradation in the quality of grain. In the current grain trade, this damage can affect price, feed quality, food product quality, and susceptibility to pest contamination.

Between the field and the end use, grain may go through any number of handling operations which can each contribute to grain damage. For example, grain might encounter free fall, conveyors, spouts, grain throwers, elevators, hoppers, dryers, and many more. Overall, these handling methods can be evaluated as to what effect they have on the grain. Damaged grain can often be characterized by the extent to which it reduces storage time. For example, cracked or broken kernels are more susceptible to insect or bacteria as well as chemical degradation. The damage to the actual grain is only one example of losses incurred after harvest. To quantify grain damage, one must also understand grain quality. Grain quality is a very broad term and can relate to many topics such as foreign material, chemical compositions, mechanical damage, insect infestations, and many more. These references to quality are highly dependent on the end use of the grain. Certain types of damage may be acceptable to specific industries, whereas others cannot use grain with these issues.

== Definition ==
Grain damage is such a broad term that it can be difficult to pinpoint all factors that can be considered damage. In addition, these factors are not easily measured. Many common methods for determining grain damage levels include some type of visible inspection, which can carry with it a large amount of error.

The United States Department of Agriculture(USDA) has for many years listed standards for many types of grains. In those standards, they have identified a normalized grading scale based on factors such as test weight and limits of damaged kernels and foreign material. Throughout these standards, the definitions listed for damage can be open to interpretation by the person evaluating the grain. For example, "damaged kernels" for maize (corn) refers to kernels that are "badly ground-damaged, badly weather-damaged, diseased, frost-damaged, germ-damaged, heat-damaged, insect-bored, mold-damaged, sprout-damaged, or otherwise materially damaged." These characteristics are largely subjective and not easily measured.

In the USDA's scale, as the grade number decreases, the quality of grain increases. A summary of these standards for maize, soybeans, and wheat are listed in the tables below (as effective September 1996). The USDA also lists these standards for many less popular grains such as barley, canola, flaxseed, oat, rye, sorghum, and sunflower seed.

U.S. Standards for Grain
Grade	U.S. Grades for (corn) maize			U.S. Grades for soybeans			U.S. Grades for wheat		
	Maximum Heat Damaged Kernels (%)	Maximum Broken Corn & Foreign Material (%)	Maximum Total Damaged Kernels (%)	Maximum Heat Damaged Kernels (%)	Maximum Splits (%)	Maximum Total Damaged Kernels (%)	Maximum Heat Damaged Kernels (%)	Maximum Shrunken/Broken Kernels (%	Maximum Total Damaged Kernels (%)
U.S. No. 1	0.1	2.0	3.0	0.2	10.0	2.0	0.2	3.0	2.0
U.S. No. 2	0.2	3.0	5.0	0.5	20.0	3.0	0.2	5.0	4.0
U.S. No. 3	0.5	4.0	7.0	1.0	30.0	5.0	0.5	8.0	7.0
U.S. No. 4	1.0	5.0	10.0	3.0	40.0	8.0	1.0	12.0	10.0
U.S. No. 5	3.0	7.0	15.0	---	---	---	3.0	20.0	15.0

== Types ==
=== Broken/Cracked Kernels ===
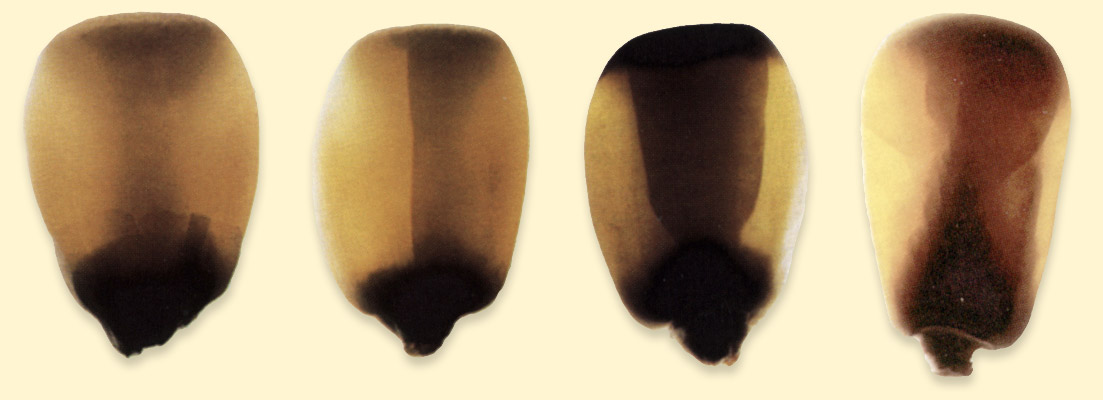
Maize kernels arranged by number of stress cracks, from zero (left) to multiple (right).

One of the most common form of grain damage is broken or cracked kernels. This is likely to happen during handling processes and transportation.

The USDA lists the cutoffs for broken maize as anything that falls through a 12/64 round-hole sieve, and broken soybeans as anything that falls through an 8/64 round-hole sieve. These standards to do not directly account for any cracks that are present in the seed coat. These cracks in kernels are known to cause deterioration of the grain more quickly through accelerated insect and fungal infestation and a quicker susceptibility to breaking during further handling. The allowable storage time for maize was found to decrease with an increase in mechanical damage (broken/cracked kernels). The storage time was found to decrease as mechanical damage increased from zero to forty percent. With this research, it is necessary to attempt to minimize the amount of mechanical damage in grains. In addition to exterior cracks, stress cracks can form inside of the kernel. These stress cracks usually come from the combination of thermal and mechanical handling processes, such as drying. Kernels with internal stress cracks are found to have a higher breakage susceptibility and can break more quickly during further handling.

Measuring Broken/Cracked Kernels

There are many methods available for determining mechanical grain damage. The simplest method involves visible inspection of the grain. The USDA lists the threshold for broken grain to be anything that will fit through a 12/64 and 8/64 inch round-hole sieve for maize and soybeans respectively as listed above. This does not account for any cracks or defects in the leftover grain itself.

In 1976, Chowdhury and Buchele developed a Numerical Damage Index for maize. They proposed a system that characterized the damage to each kernel on a scale from D1 (no defects) to D5 (very severely damaged). The procedure then takes a weighted average of the number of kernels assigned to each level to obtain a standardized measure of mechanical damage. This approach is based on visual observations, which carry with them a large amount of variability due to the individual conducting the test.

Other researchers have attempted to measure mechanical damage in more concrete ways. One method is to use a dye that will adhere only to the broken areas of the kernel. From there, the dye is washed off with some type of solvent and measured using a colorimetric technique. A more recently developed technique uses the dielectric properties of the grain to measure the damage level; this method proved to very accurately measure the number of damaged kernels.

=== Fungal and insect infestation ===
Images of mold and insect infestation in maize and wheat kernels
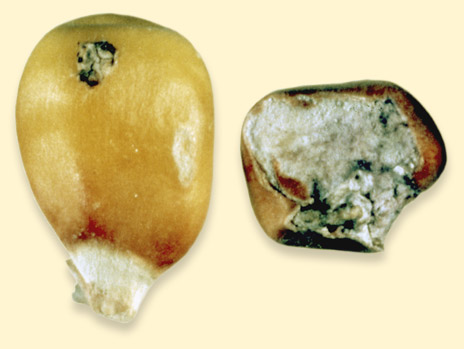
Kernels which contain any mold on the exposed part of the kernel are considered damaged

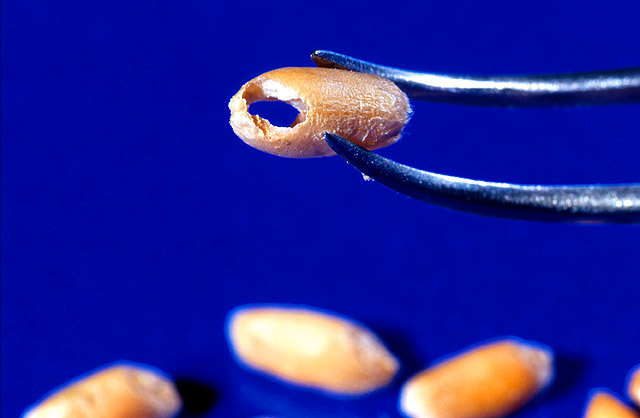
Insect-damaged wheat kernels are caused by internal-feeding grain insects.

Fungal and insect infestations can cause dry matter losses which in turn make the grain less valuable. Insect infestation and growth of fungi (including mold) go hand in hand, as many insects actually feed on the storage molds created through the deterioration of grain. Insect infestations can result in not only grain damage as understood by shorter storage times, but can also affect the actual weight of the grain, leading to lower prices at market. In addition, these problems can reduce the nutritional or chemical value of the grain, which can be very important based on the end use. Mold growth can be triggered by moisture, mechanical damage, storage temperature, and other factors. Mycotoxins refers to the toxic fungal chemicals that grow on crops. Of these, the most researched of these is aflatoxin, which have the potential to be carcinogenic (cancer-causing).

Identifying fungal and insect infestation

The appearance of mycotoxins in grain may have different affects. Some noticeable effects include color changes or mold spots as shown in the images, or even an odor coming from the grain. However, more underlying effects of fungal infection may be subtle and hard to notice without testing. As with broken and cracked kernels, mold damage is usually graded on a visual inspection basis, which can be subjective and have a large variation. Ng et al. used a machine vision method of evaluating mold damage by calculating the number of pixels in an image of grain that included mold, and representing that as a fraction of the total surface area. Infestation by insects such as the maize weevil can sometimes be easier to identify visually, but difficult to quantify on a large scale.

=== Damage caused by pests ===
Moths are common pests of grain storage facilities, and are most often found when the grain is stored improperly. Species such as Pyralis farinalis live in grain silos where moisture has been able to infiltrate the grain supply. These moths will lay their eggs in the grain and all parts of the grain will be eaten by the caterpillars after they hatch.

Rats and mice can damage stored grain because they eat it for vitamins and eat primarily the embryo. This can damage the nutrition and germination of the grain.

=== Heat damage ===
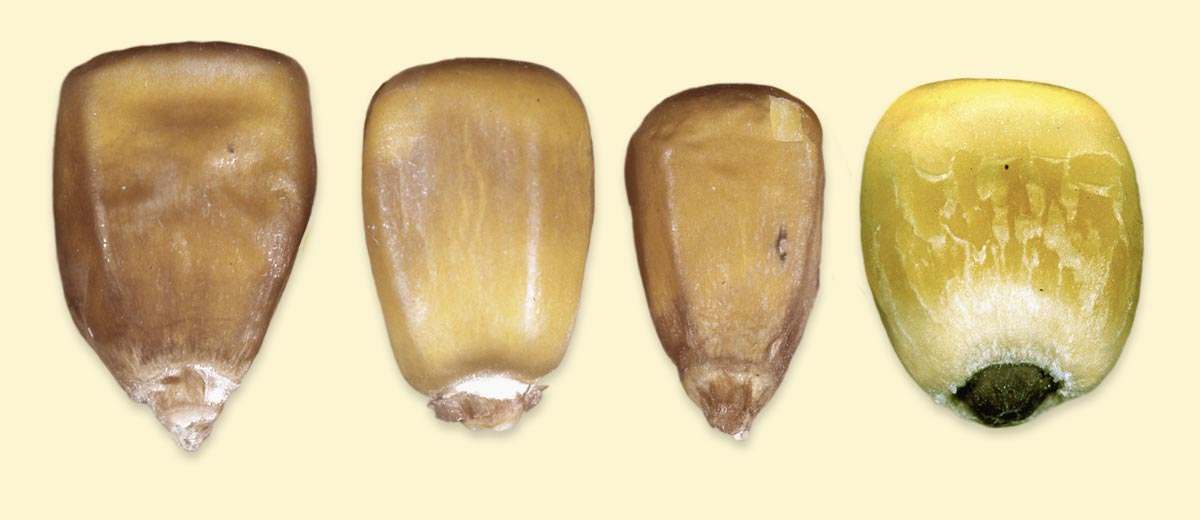
Heat damaged maize kernels may have a discolored, wrinkled, and blistered, be puffed and/or swollen, or their seed coats may begin peeling off.

Heat damage most likely comes from drying of grain. It is a subset of damage including broken or cracked kernels but is identified as its own type of damage by the USDA. The elevated temperatures used during the drying process to eliminate moisture can have adverse effects on the kernels themselves. The most common signs of heat damage include breakage/cracks, discoloration, and shrinkage. When grain goes through the drying process, temperature and moisture gradients in the grain which can cause stress cracks both on the interior and exterior of the kernels. These cracks can pose problems for grain quality as listed in the two previous types of grain damage.

Brown et al. showed that as moisture content increases, the percentage of stress-cracked kernels also increases for multiple types of drying. Some research has also been done on the effect of different types of convective dryers. Jayas and Ghosh found that the percentage of stress cracked kernels was largest with cross-flow driers and smallest with concurrent-flow dryers.

Measuring heat damage

Heat damage can be measured in a number of ways. First of all is always visual inspection. A noticeable change in color is a distinct effect of heat damage. Some researchers have developed their own methods for identifying color differences through the use of what they call a color difference meter. This meter measures color by three parameters based on lightness and darkness of the sample. A more recent method of assessing heat damage has been created for wheat by Wang, Dowell, and Chung using near-infrared spectroscopy. Their process for using the near-infrared spectroscopy process could classify heat damaged kernels at a rate of approximately 96 percent accuracy.

== Causes ==
=== Damage during harvest ===
This article focuses on the damage incurred to grain between the field and its end use. Therefore, the first cause of grain damage is harvesting itself. A large cause of grain damage is mechanical damage incurred during the threshing process in a combine. This process of stripping the grain from the plant can often cause cracks and other damage. Many researches have attempted to find methods to minimize grain damage without inhibiting harvest productivity. Many harvest factors can effect the amount of damage that grain will incur during harvest. Some of these are uncontrollable by the operator such as moisture content. However, many of the parameters of the combine can be varied in an attempt to reduce grain damage and obtain better yields. Some of these parameters include rotor speed, ground speed, concave settings, sieve settings, and fan speeds. Research indicates that the rotor speed has the largest effect on grain damage, with damage increasing exponentially with rotor speed. In addition, grain damage can actually increase as the forward speed, or ground speed, of the machine is decreased. Similar ground speed trends were found in wheat. The settings of the concave can also increase grain damage if the gap of the concave is too narrow or as the length of the concave increases.

=== Damage during handling ===
==== Filling ====
Free fall and spouting

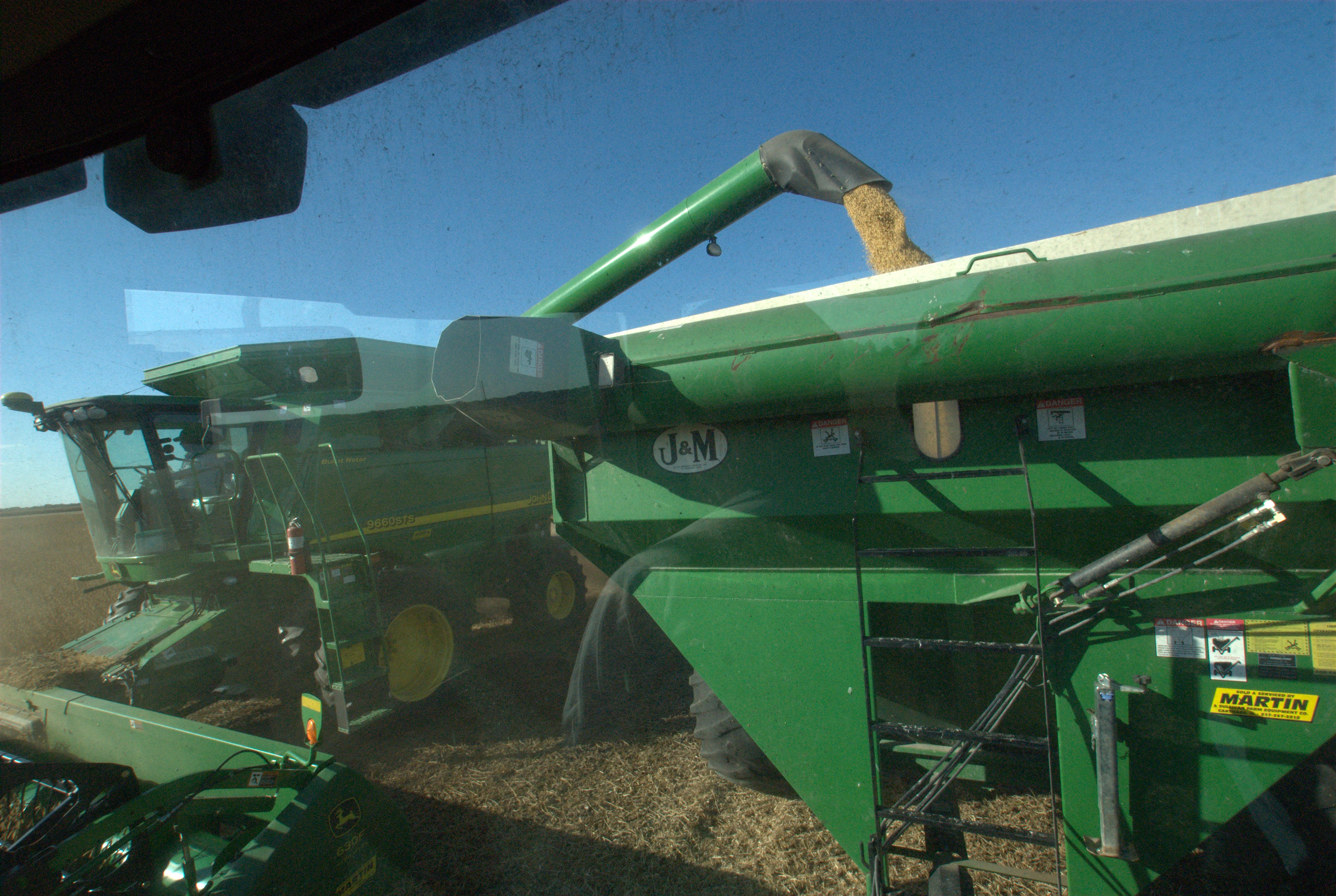
Combine using auger to unload into grain cart.

Grain undergoes free fall during many handling processes. For example, the grain is conveyed out of the combine and dropped into some other storage device, usually a grain cart or semi. It also undergoes free fall when unloaded into bins or silos. Grain can be damaged from free fall anytime it is dropped into a new storage device. This damage is dependent on many factors such as type of grain, the height of travel, contact surfaces, discharge size, and impact angle. As grain drop height increases, so does the amount of mechanical damage incurred due to the impact. For the same distance dropped, the highest percent of breakage will be in maize, followed by soybeans and then wheat. Grain throwers may be used spread grain in an attempt to reach the full load capacity of a storage space, and can increase damage due to the grain undergoing yet another handling process.

==== Conveyors ====
There are many options for moving grain from one location to another. Some of these options include conveyors such as belt conveyors, drag conveyors, screw conveyors, and pneumatic conveyors. Belt conveyors cause the least damage to grain due to the lack of contact forces, however, they cannot be used for steep inclines. Another commonly used conveyor is screw conveyors. Screw conveyors, also known as augers, are conveyors made from a helical blade with rotational motion to move grain. They are on many types of farm equipment, including combines and grain carts for example. Augers generally have a high power requirements, but are portable and low cost. In addition, augers tend to cause high levels of mechanical damage to the grain. Much research has been completed to quantify the amount of grain damage caused by various screw conveyors. The percentage of grain damage is decreased when the auger is operated at capacity because the grain cannot bounce around and strike surfaces as easily. In addition, grain damage increases with increased rotational speed. For this research with screw conveyors, the angle of the incline was found to have no significant effect on the grain damage.

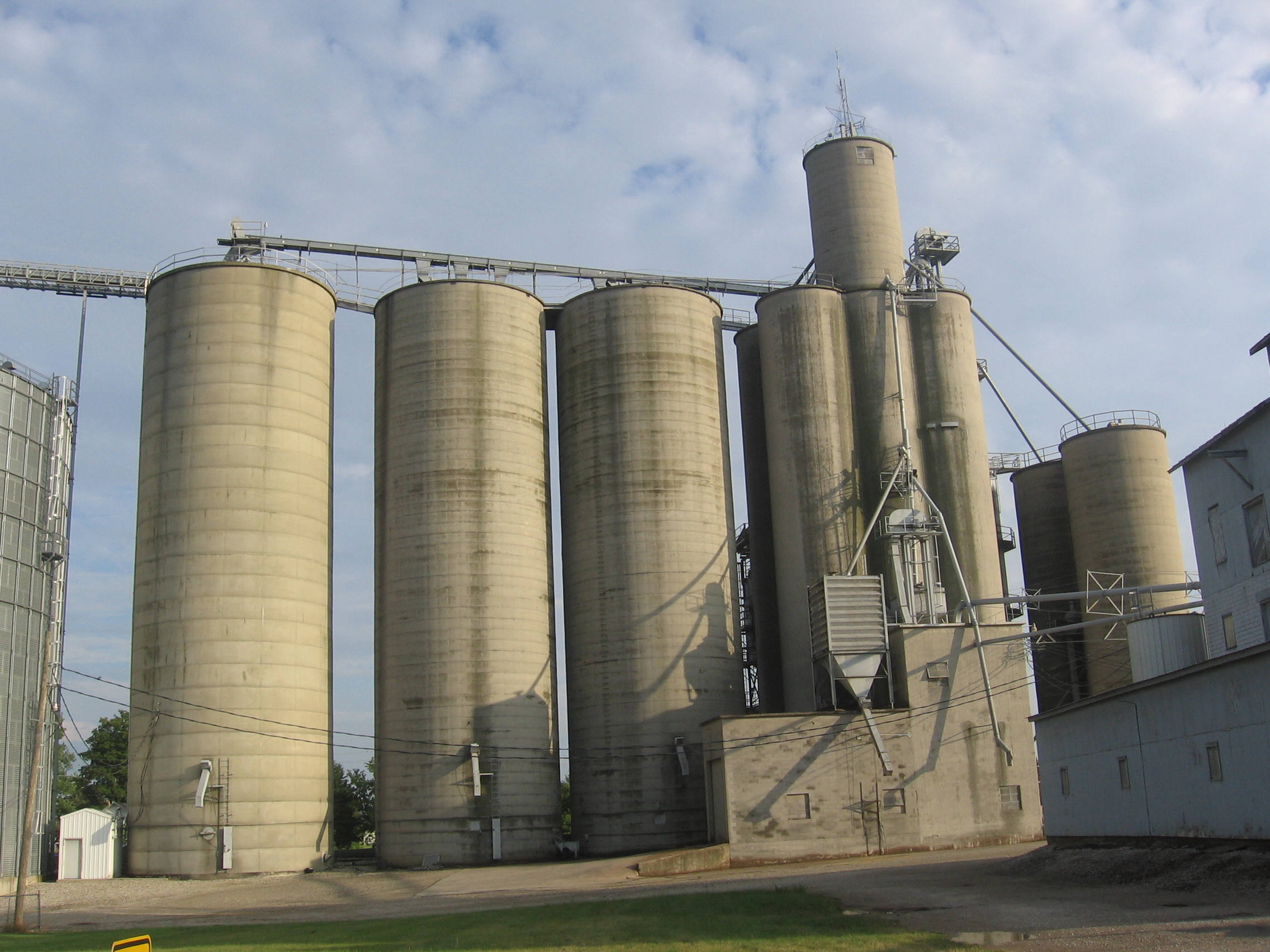
Grain elevator in Edon, Ohio

Pneumatic conveyors use a moving air-stream to propel grain, and are used in situations when the path of the grain is complex. Grain damage can occur especially at any changes in the tube path, but can be minimized when air speeds are kept below 25 meters per second. It is shown that grain damage increases exponentially above air velocities of 20 meters per second. In research by Baker et al. breakage levels of maize in pneumatic conveyors were found to be similar to those of bucket or drag conveyors.

==== Elevators ====
The grain elevator may contain several types of these conveyors, such as belt or drag conveyors. In addition, they use bucket elevators to lift the grain from the drop off point to the storage bins. Bucket elevators can be used in many places of final storage or use, after grain is dropped off by whatever form of transportation was used to get it there. Bucket conveyors often impart little mechanical damage because the grains are not continually moving with respect to each other. Grain damage is only imparted when the kernels are loaded into the buckets at the bottom of the elevator and when they are discharged at the top.
