= Occupational hazards of grain facilities =

Factor affecting health and safety of people at work

Occupational hazards of grain facilities can be mitigated through diligence and proper safety procedures. These hazards represent the health and safety risks to which an employee is vulnerable. Grain facility occupation exposure is the quantifiable expression of workplace health and safety hazards to which a grain-handling facility employee is vulnerable in performing their assigned duties. Exposure represents the probability that a given hazard will have some level of effect of a receptor of interest.

The agricultural industry is consistently ranked as one of the most dangerous. Its annual fatality rate of 24.9 deaths per 100,000 is nearly seven times higher than the rate for all private industry workers, which is 3.5 deaths per 100,000. From 2003 to 2011, work-related injuries in agriculture caused 5,816 fatalities. On average, 243 agricultural workers suffer a serious lost-work-time injury each day, and five percent of these incidents result in permanent impairment. In 2012, agricultural facilities had 475 fatalities, giving the sector the highest fatal injury rate of any industry for the second consecutive year, at 21.2 fatal injuries per 100,000 full-time workers.

== Exposure hazards ==
=== Grain entrapment ===
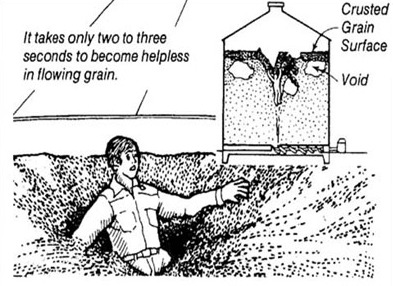
This OSHA diagram warns of the dangers of grain entrapment.

Grain entrapment occurs when a person is partially submerged in grain and cannot get out; grain engulfment occurs when a person is completely submerged. Engulfment mainly happens at grain storage facilities such as silos or grain elevators, but can also occur anywhere with large quantities of grain, including freestanding outdoor piles. A worker can be submerged in moments, suffocate within minutes, and take hours to locate and recover. Rescuing an engulfed person may be possible if their airway remains unobstructed.

In the United States in 2010, 57 workers were engulfed in grain, resulting in 26 fatalities. In 2012, 19 workers were engulfed in grain, resulting in 8 fatalities.

Research has identified a link between out-of-condition grain and engulfment incidents. Out-of-condition grain is stored grain that has become wet, clumped, or spoiled. This grain tends to clump together, increasing the risk of engulfment. Workers enter grain bins to loosen crusted grain that cakes to the walls of storage bins to facilitate its removal. A typical engulfment scenario begins when wet or moldy grain is stored, which then cakes to the side of the bin or "bridges" across the top. A worker enters the unit to dislodge the material, which then collapses and engulfs the worker.

Workers can become entrapped in three main ways: by entering a storage bin while grain is flowing; by standing on an apparently stable surface that is actually a "grain bridge" with a hollow cavity underneath; or when a vertical mass of grain settled against a wall suddenly gives way during clearing. If a worker enters a bin and an auger starts removing grain, the worker can become entrapped within four to five seconds and fully engulfed within 11 seconds.

Other factors with a statistically significant relationship with grain engulfment include the type of grain, geographic location, type of facility, and victim demographics. More than half of recorded incidents occur in corn; other grains include soybeans, oats, wheat, flax, and canola. Because corn is largely produced in the Corn Belt states of Illinois, Indiana, Iowa, Minnesota, and Ohio, most engulfment incidents occur there. One study of 60 grain entrapment cases found that 43% involved corn and 22% involved soybeans.

More than 70% of entrapments have occurred on small or family farms, which are typically exempt from OSHA grain-handling regulations. All engulfment victims have been male, and 75% have been farmers, farm workers, or members of farm families. The average age of victims is around 40, but a disproportionate share are under 18 years old.

=== Grain dust explosions ===
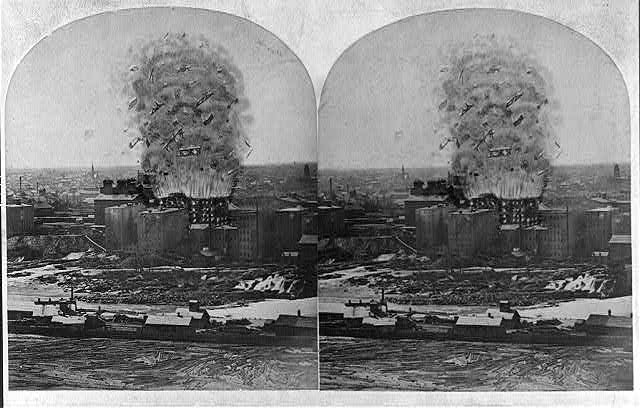
This stereograph shows the Washburn 'A' Mill after a grain dust explosion in Minneapolis, c. 1878.

Nearly any finely-divided organic substance becomes an explosive material when dispersed as an air suspension. The fine flour found in grain-handling facilities can become dangerously explosive in this state.

The dust explosion pentagon illustrates the five elements required for a combustible dust explosion.

A fire requires three elements, forming a fire triangle: combustible dust (fuel), an ignition source (heat), and oxygen (oxidizer). A combustible dust explosion requires two additional elements: the dispersion of dust particles in sufficient quantity and concentration, and the confinement of the dust cloud.

=== Falls ===
In 2011, the Bureau of Labor Statistics (BLS) reported a non-fatal, fall-related injury rate of 48.2 per 100,000 workers in the agricultural industry, a rate higher than in the transportation, mining, or manufacturing industries. The BLS also reported 167 worker fatalities in the agriculture industry between 2007 and 2011.

Relatively short falls, from 12 to 20 feet (3.7 to 6.1 m), can be fatal. Falling hazards in a grain-handling facility include floors, machinery, structures, roofs, skylights, unguarded holes, wall and floor openings, ladders, unguarded catwalks, platforms, and manlifts. Workers are also exposed to potentially fatal falls when they move from the vertical exterior ladders on grain bins to the bin roof or through a bin entrance. Between 1985 and 1989, falls from heights were the second leading cause of grain-handling worker fatalities. Falls from machinery and structures were the second largest single cause of grain- and silage-handling fatalities during this period; falls from structures accounted for 79 percent of these fatalities.

=== Amputations ===
Mechanical equipment in grain storage structures, such as augers and conveyors, presents serious entanglement and amputation hazards. Workers can get their limbs caught in improperly guarded moving parts. Although many pieces of equipment have safety features such as guards, covers, and shields, workers increase their risk of injury when they attempt to disable these protective features.

=== Airborne contaminants ===
Hazardous atmospheres can develop in grain storage structures due to gases from fermenting grains or fumigation. Fumigants are commonly used for insect control. Exposure can cause central nervous system damage, heart and vascular disease, lung edema, and cancer. In addition to direct health risks, exposure to these gases can incapacitate a worker, leading to injury from falling or suffocation from engulfment. Workers who handle fumigants or fumigated grain are exposed to these contaminants. Fermenting grain produces nitric oxide (NO) and respiratory irritants such as nitrogen dioxide (NO_{2}) and nitrogen tetroxide (N_{2}O_{4}). Low NO_{2} concentrations can cause coughing, labored breathing, or nausea; high concentrations can cause fluid to fill the lungs, which can be fatal.

Hazardous gas concentrations are generally highest within the first 48 hours after silage is added to a container but may persist for about four weeks. The hazardous gases from fermenting silage (NO_{2} and N_{2}O_{4}) are heavier than air and can typically be reduced in silos by opening the container's chute doors. Even after airing out the bin, potentially fatal concentrations may remain in the air space between the bottom of the silo chute door and the top of the silage. Workers can be exposed if they fall, bend over, or if the gas is stirred up by a draft or their activity.

=== Young workers ===
More than 60% of all recorded grain engulfment cases occur at facilities not subject to OSHA regulations, mainly on-farm family grain storage units. Of these cases at OSHA-exempt facilities, 70% involve children. In 2011, the Department of Labor proposed sweeping regulations that would have prohibited underage workers from entering grain silos and performing other hazardous activities. Another study found that roughly one in five grain entrapments involve a child.

== Mitigation ==
Risks can be reduced through engineering controls, administrative controls, and personal protective equipment. Common administrative controls include safety training and restricting access to hazardous areas, such as by locking ladders at a height of 6–8 feet (1.8–2.4 m) to prevent unauthorized access. Lockout-tagout procedures are critical for preventing amputations and entrapments by ensuring machinery cannot be energized during maintenance. For airborne contaminants, bins are ventilated for at least 30 minutes prior to and during entry. Additional time is needed for silos larger than 24 feet (7.3 m) in diameter or if the silage surface is more than 15 feet (4.6 m) from the top. Dust explosions are mitigated through housekeeping practices that eliminate combustible dust accumulation and by performing hazard assessments of materials, operations, and potential ignition sources.

Personal protective equipment includes body harnesses and lifelines for workers entering bins, which is a federal requirement under certain conditions. Fall protection also involves harnesses and lanyards, along with ensuring ropes and ladders are in good condition. OSHA's Amputations National Emphasis Program specifically targets compliance with machine guarding standards.

== See also ==
- Agricultural safety and health
