= National Action Plan for Children =

A "National Plan of Action for Children" (NPA) is a national report in follow-up to the 2002 Special Session on Children of the UN General Assembly in New York. Many countries have been developing their own NPAs since 2002.
