= Canadian Agricultural Safety Association =

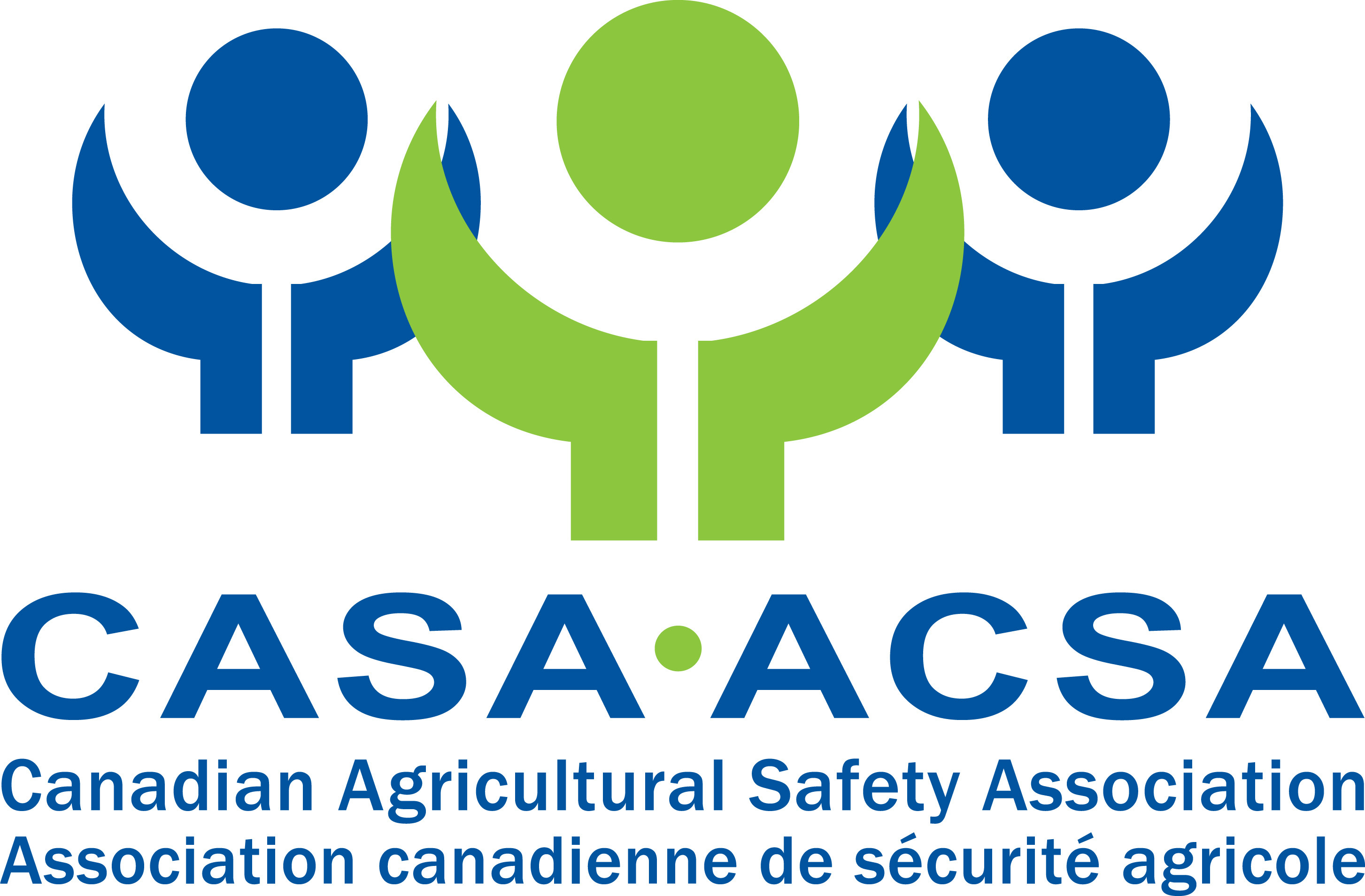
CASA was established in 1993 in response to an identified need for a national farm safety networking and coordinating agency to address problems of illness, injuries and accidental death in farmers, their families and agricultural workers.

The Canadian Agricultural Safety Association was established in 1993 in response to an identified need for a national farm safety networking and coordinating agency to address problems of illness, injuries and accidental death in farmers, their families and agricultural workers. Since then, CASA has worked to improve the health and safety conditions of those who live and work on Canadian farms.

CASA is funded by Agriculture and Agri-Food Canada's Renewal Chapter and has applied for similar support under the federal government's Growing Forward program for 2009–2013.

In the past, CASA acted as facilitator and enabler. For instance, in 2007-08, CASA extended $637,365 to 20 organizations for 24 farm safety projects, directly reaching more than 376,000 producers across Canada.

In the future, CASA will operate as a national health and safety initiator and service provider.

Canada's agricultural industry is one of the top three most hazardous industries in which to work. And yet, farmers themselves believe their safety habits are better than fair. Farm Credit Canada recently conducted a national survey to determine farmer's attitudes toward safety. The final report is a self-assessment of how farmers visualize their safety performance. They gave themselves a "B".

CASA has dedicated itself to close the gap between what they believe and what is actually occurring.

CASA has developed a new 5-year strategic plan. The strategic plan includes the following 13 key result activities:
1. Develop and market national training products and resources
2. Develop a national social marketing campaign to promote prevention
3. Identify and support provincial safety and health champions
4. Expand Progressive Agricultural Foundation Safety Days across Canada
5. Play more of a role in guiding research and development of innovations and services to reduce injuries
6. Continue with "Canadian Agricultural Safety and Health Program" (CASHP) granting proposal
7. Develop and offer workplace safety training and instruction (AH&S core competencies) to those working in the agricultural health and safety field
8. Implement a national health and safety communication strategy
9. Promote and implement national prevention initiatives across Canada, such as engineering solutions, case study training, farm safety plans, etc.
10. Partner with Public Health Agency of Canada to facilitate injury surveillance data and conduct injury analysis
11. Continue to update machinery standards through the Canadian Standards Association
12. Act as funding intermediary for Canadian Farmers with Disabilities
13. Seek out additional funding sources.

At CASA's Safety Summit of October 2008, in Saskatoon, there was consensus that CASA must move forward with the proposed strategic plan. Many of the participants committed, on behalf of their organizations, to support the strategy with time and resources.

== Recent Successes ==
Contributing to a sector that is competitive and innovative:

- Return on investment - every dollar allocated to CASA is matched in cash or in-kind.
- Credible central source of agricultural safety e.g. Discovery Channel.
- Agricultural Injury/Fatality data collected and compiled. Reports produced.
- Contact list has grown to over 840 people and organizations.
- Two research centers now have a rural/agricultural component as part of their mandate and producing reports and recommendations.
- Prairie Agricultural Machinery Institute has developed guarding retrofits for augers and machines and refined a pot-lifting device to improve ergonomics in Nurseries. Funding for a pilot program to retrofit tractors without Roll Overprotective Structures (ROPS) is underway.
- Successful projects developed in one province modified for national reach. e.g.: Confined spaces training by the Union des producteurs agricoles, Work Horse training by Institute for Agricultural and Rural Environmental Health.
- U.S. farm foundation is working to create a CASA-like organization in the U.S.

Enabling a sector that contributes to society's priorities:

- Funding of Canadian Farmers with Disabilities Registry (CFWDR) has permitted networking for disabled farmers.
- Partnership with the Progressive Agriculture Safety Days allows CASA to reach over 7,000 Canadian rural youth and volunteers annually.
- CASA regularly receives media requests and e-mail requests for information.
- Website statistics continue to show increased traffic and downloads.
- Producer organizations are actively involved in Canadian Agricultural Safety Week launches. The campaign was awarded an *International Association of Business Communicators (IABC) Ottawa Excel Award in the Public Relations category.

Building a sector that is proactive in managing risks:

- Trend data indicates decrease in tractor and child related injuries.
- CASA has influenced editorial content of agricultural publications.
- Farmers are supporting safety initiatives with resolutions at AGMs such as Dairy Farmers and KAP.
- Farm machinery manufacturers are involved in CSA standards updates.

== Governance ==
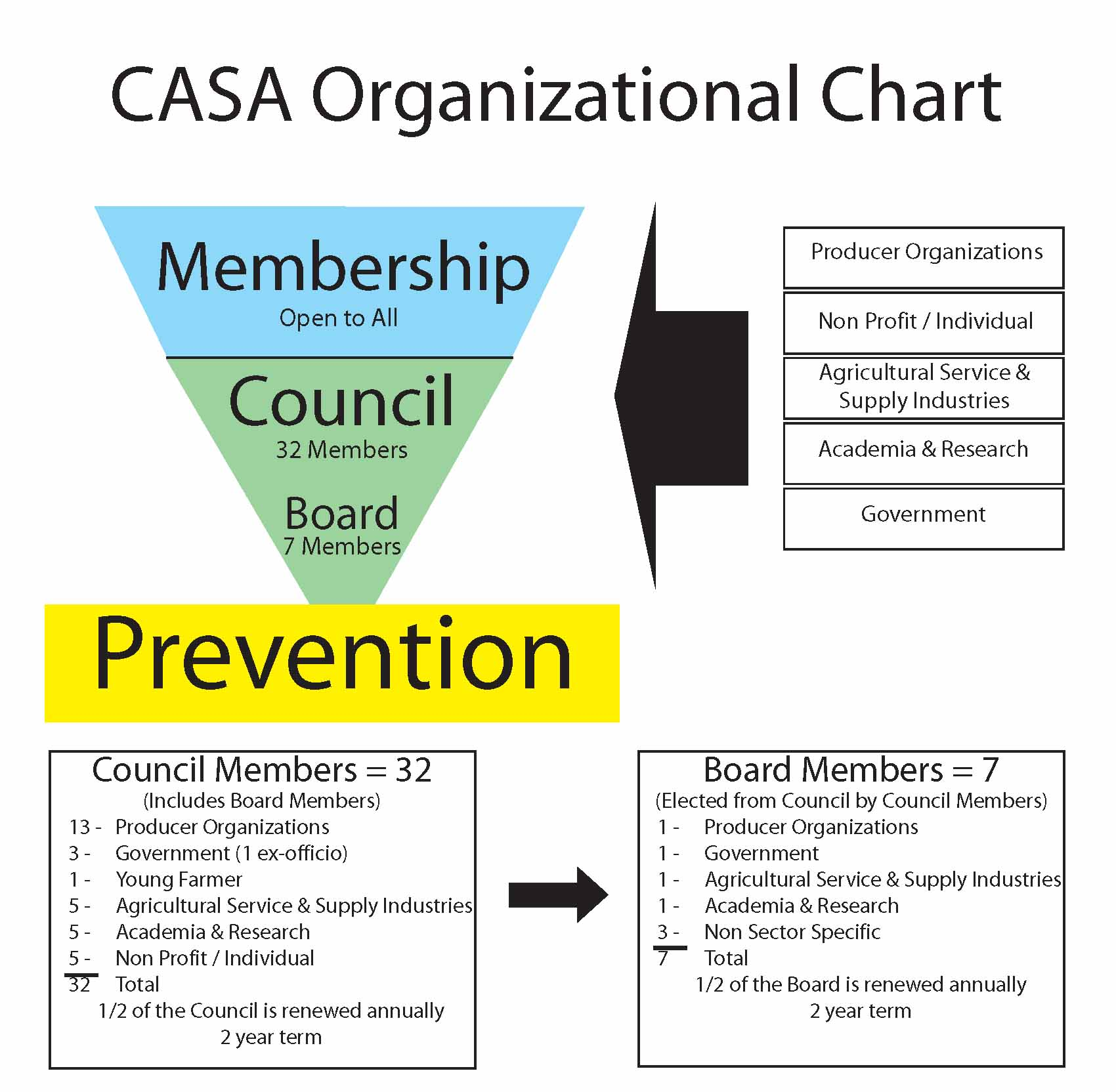
CASA is led by a seven-person Board of Directors elected for three-year terms by the 32 member Council. The Board elects its Executive annually.

CASA is led by a seven-person Board of Directors elected for three-year terms by the 32-member Council. The Board elects its Executive annually. Visit the CASA/ACSA website for information about the current Board of Directors.

== Canadian Agricultural Injury Reporting (CAIR) ==
Canadian Agricultural Injury Reporting (CAIR) formerly the Canadian Agricultural Injury Surveillance Program (CAISP) - is an integrated national surveillance project of the Canadian Agricultural Safety Association that guides and informs the national agricultural health and safety agenda.

CAISP's latest national report Agricultural Injuries in Canada for 1990–2005 can be downloaded free.

It describes the occurrence of fatal agricultural injuries in Canada by age group and mechanism of injury. There were 1,769 agricultural fatalities in Canada from 1990 to 2005. Overall, more than half of the agricultural fatalities were due to four machine-related causes: machine rollovers, machine runovers, machine entanglements and traffic collisions. The top five causes of agricultural fatalities in Canada were machine rollovers (20.5%), machine runovers (18.6%), machine entanglements (8.3%), traffic collisions (7.3%), and being pinned or struck by a machine (7.0%).

Their recent fifteen-year summary reports on fatal agricultural rollovers, runovers, animal injuries, injuries to older adults and injuries to children can be downloaded here.

== Canadian Agricultural Safety and Health Program (CASHP) ==
Under the Federal-Provincial-Territorial Framework Agreement on Agricultural and Agri-Food Policy, the Canadian Agricultural Safety Association (CASA) has been recognized as the association to provide a forum for directing and coordinating activities with a national, multi-provincial or provincial scope specifically related to farm safety and rural health issues.

In 2008-09, CASA approved $283,642.50 for 16 projects under CASHP.

In 2008-09, 13 groups or individuals qualified to receive CASHP funding. Applicants may be:
- Individuals
- Producer organizations
- Not-for profit organizations
- Agricultural service/supply industry
- Academia and research
- Provincial and municipal governments

== Progressive Agriculture Safety Days ==
CASA supports the Progressive Agriculture Safety Days in Canada. This educational program has helped children across Canada learn about dangers and potential deadly outcomes of unsafe behaviour on the farm.

"When an individual or community partners with the Progressive Agriculture Safety Day program, they are provided planning resources to help each Safety Day become a success" says Susan Reynolds, Executive Director-Programs of the Progressive Agriculture Safety Day. "Through our program, each lead coordinator is provided training on how to organize a Safety Day and is offered year-round support."

Each safety day is organized locally, allowing communities to meet local priorities in their area. Children rotate among different safety stations, allowing each child the opportunity to participate in interactive and engaging activities."

In 2009, 72 Safety Days are planned for Alberta, Saskatchewan, Manitoba, Ontario, Quebec, Nova Scotia and New Brunswick involving more than 13,000 youth and over 3000 adult volunteers!

Founded by The Progressive Farmer magazine in the U.S. in 1995, the program trains and provides the resources that local communities need to conduct one-day safety programs that are age-appropriate, hands-on, fun, and safe for children. While the basic program reaches children ages of 8 to 13, safety days may also be conducted for 4- to 7-year-olds or even entire families.

The mission of the Progressive Agriculture Safety Days is to make farm and ranch life safer and healthier for all children through education and training.
