= Positive semidefinite =

In mathematics, positive semidefinite may refer to:

- Positive semidefinite function
- Positive semidefinite matrix
- Positive semidefinite operator
- Positive semidefinite quadratic form
- Positive semidefinite bilinear form
