= Test weight =

Test weight refers to the average weight of a cereal as measured in pounds per bushel (1bu. = 8 gallons or 2150.42 cu. inches). Test weight is an important predictor of milling yield for rice and flour extraction rate for wheat. USDA’s official weight per bushel for the highest grade for major cereals and oilseeds include: wheat and soybeans (60 lbs./bu.); corn, sorghum, and rye (56 lbs./bu.); barley (48 lbs./bu.); oats (32 lbs./bu.); and rice (45 lbs./bu.). When producers deliver grain that is significantly below the official weights the prices are discounted. Official U.S. Grain Standards (developed and used under authority of the United States Grain Standards Act, USGSA) include test weight criteria.
