= Pesticides Safety Directorate =

UK government agency based in York, England

PSD

The Pesticides Safety Directorate was an agency of the Department for Environment, Food and Rural Affairs (Defra). It was based in York, England, with about 200 scientific, policy and support staff and was responsible for the authorisation of plant protection products and, from 2005, detergents, in the United Kingdom.

In April 2008, it joined the Health and Safety Executive (HSE), and in April 2009, became part of a newly formed Chemicals Regulation Directorate (CRD) at the HSE.

== Aims of the Pesticides Safety Directorate ==
- To ensure the safe use of pesticides and detergents for people and the environment.
- To harmonise pesticide regulation within the European Community and provide a level playing field for crop protection.
- As part of the strategy for sustainable food and farming, to reduce negative impacts of pesticides on the environment.
