= Sorbey =

Sorbey may refer to the following places in France:

- Sorbey, Meuse, a commune in the Meuse department
- Sorbey, Moselle, a commune in the Moselle department

== See also ==
- Sorby, a surname
- Sorby Research Institute, a Second World War medical research facility in Sheffield, England
- Sörby (disambiguation)
