= Sorby =

Sorby is an English family name and may refer to the following people:

- Angela Sorby, American poet, professor and literary scholar
- Henry Clifton Sorby (1826–1908), English microscopist and geologist
- Sheryl Sorby, American mechanical engineer and professor
- Sunniva Sorby, Norwegian-Canadian expeditioner, historian and guide
- Thomas Sorby (1856–1930), English international footballer
- Thomas Charles Sorby (1836–1924), English architect who emigrated to Canada
- Warren Sorby (born 1965), Fijian Olympic swimmer

== See also ==
- Sorby Research Institute, a Second World War medical research facility in Sheffield, England
- Sörby (disambiguation)
- Sorbey, Meuse, France, a commune
- Sorbey, Moselle, France, a commune
