= Billy-sous-Mangiennes =

- Commune
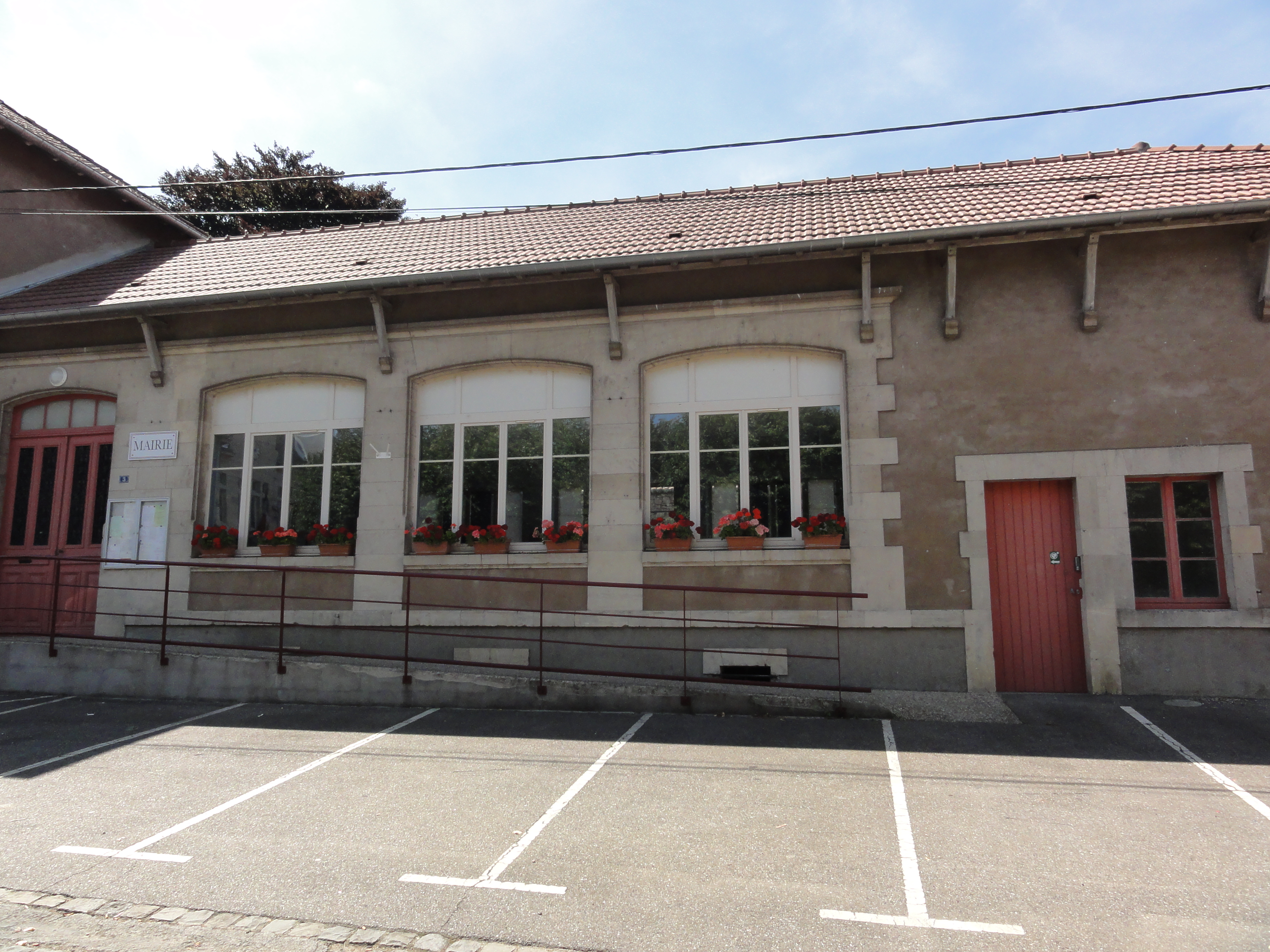
- The town hall in Billy-sous-Mangiennes

- Coat of arms
- Location of Billy-sous-Mangiennes
- Location within France Location within Grand Est
- Coordinates: 49°20′00″N 5°34′34″E
- Country: France
- Region: Grand Est
- Department: Meuse
- Arrondissement: Verdun
- Canton: Bouligny
- Intercommunality: Damvillers Spincourt

Government
  - Mayor (2020–2026): Bénédicte Gonzalez
- Area^{1}: 24.66 km^{2} (9.52 sq mi)
- Elevation: 209 m (686 ft)
- Highest elevation: 250 m (820 ft)
- Lowest elevation: 202 m (663 ft)
- Population (2023): 349
  - Density: 14.2/km^{2} (36.7/sq mi)
- Time zone: UTC+01:00 (CET)
  - Summer (DST): UTC+02:00 (CEST)
- INSEE/Postal code: 55053 /55230
- ^{1} French Land Register data, which excludes lakes, ponds, glaciers > 1 km^{2} (0.386 sq mi or 247 acres) and river estuaries.

Billy-sous-Mangiennes (French pronunciation: [biji su mɑ̃ʒjɛn]; literally "Billy under Mangiennes") is a commune in the Meuse department, in the Grand Est in northeastern France.

== Population ==
Historical population
Year	Pop.	±% p.a.
1968	394	—
1975	383	−0.40%
1982	366	−0.65%
1990	355	−0.38%
1999	297	−1.96%
2007	375	+2.96%
2012	380	+0.27%
2017	373	−0.37%
2023	349	−1.10%
Source: INSEE

== See also ==
- Communes of the Meuse department
