= Vaudoncourt =

Vaudoncourt may refer to the following places in France:

- Vaudoncourt, Meuse, a commune in the Meuse department
- Vaudoncourt, Vosges, a commune in the Vosges department
