= Villers-lès-Mangiennes =

- Commune
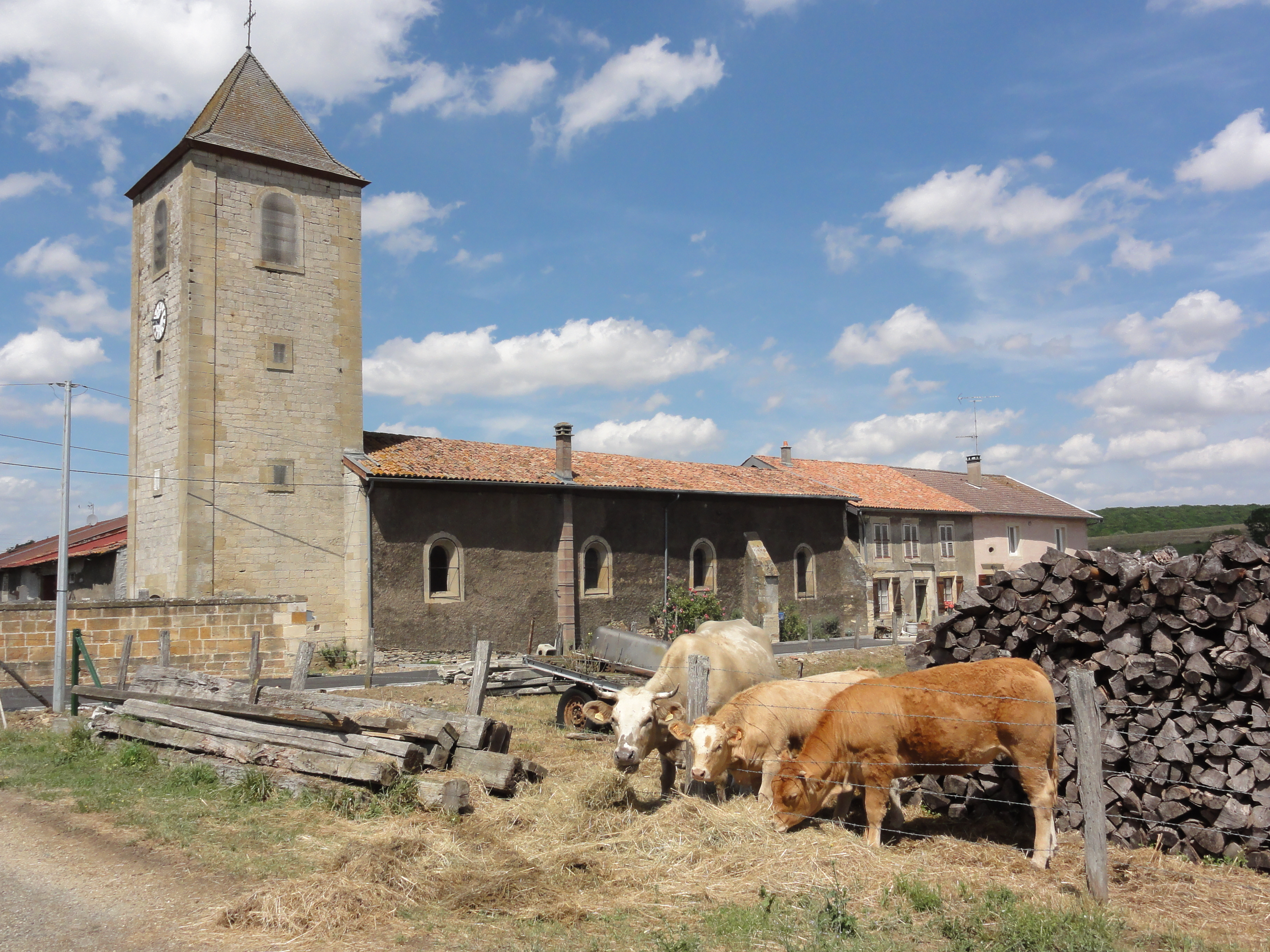
- The church in Villers-lès-Mangiennes
- Location of Villers-lès-Mangiennes
- Location within France Location within Grand Est
- Coordinates: 49°22′00″N 5°30′00″E
- Country: France
- Region: Grand Est
- Department: Meuse
- Arrondissement: Verdun
- Canton: Bouligny
- Intercommunality: CC Damvillers Spincourt

Government
  - Mayor (2020–2026): Noël Macel
- Area^{1}: 8 km^{2} (3.1 sq mi)
- Elevation: 210 m (690 ft)
- Population (2023): 72
  - Density: 9.0/km^{2} (23/sq mi)
- Time zone: UTC+01:00 (CET)
  - Summer (DST): UTC+02:00 (CEST)
- INSEE/Postal code: 55563 /55150
- ^{1} French Land Register data, which excludes lakes, ponds, glaciers > 1 km^{2} (0.386 sq mi or 247 acres) and river estuaries.

Villers-lès-Mangiennes (French pronunciation: [vilɛʁ lɛ mɑ̃ʒjɛn], literally Villers near Mangiennes) is a commune in the Meuse department in Grand Est in north-eastern France.

== See also ==
- Communes of the Meuse department
