= Muzeray =

- Commune
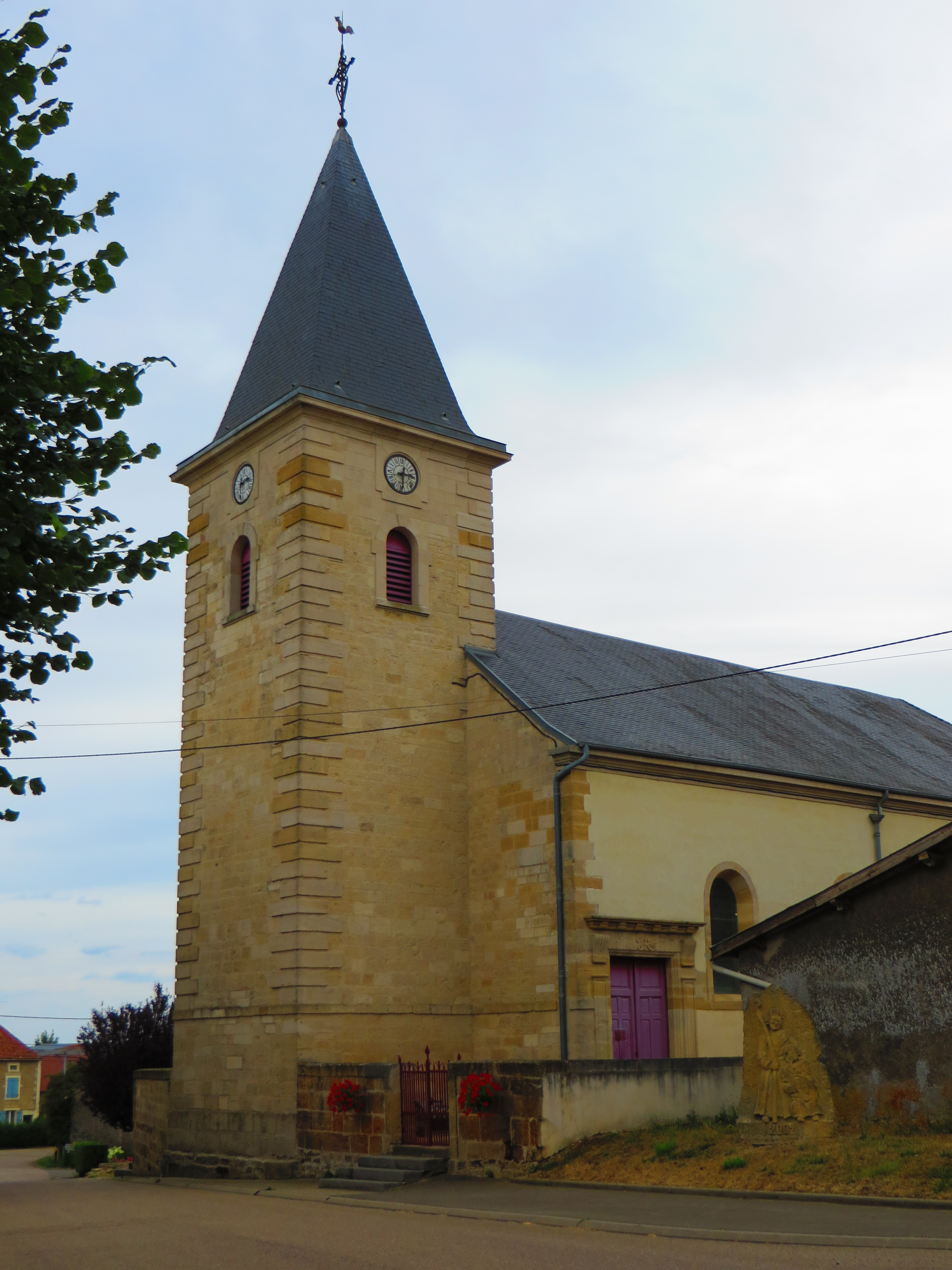
- The church in Muzeray
- Location of Muzeray
- Location within France Location within Grand Est
- Coordinates: 49°20′27″N 5°37′30″E
- Country: France
- Region: Grand Est
- Department: Meuse
- Arrondissement: Verdun
- Canton: Bouligny
- Intercommunality: CC Damvillers Spincourt

Government
  - Mayor (2020–2026): Alexandre Marbehant
- Area^{1}: 8.45 km^{2} (3.26 sq mi)
- Elevation: 240 m (790 ft)
- Population (2023): 133
  - Density: 15.7/km^{2} (40.8/sq mi)
- Time zone: UTC+01:00 (CET)
  - Summer (DST): UTC+02:00 (CEST)
- INSEE/Postal code: 55367 /55230
- ^{1} French Land Register data, which excludes lakes, ponds, glaciers > 1 km^{2} (0.386 sq mi or 247 acres) and river estuaries.

Muzeray is a commune in the Meuse department in Grand Est in north-eastern France.

== Geography ==
The river Othain forms most of the commune's eastern border.

== See also ==
- Communes of the Meuse department
