= Éton =

- Commune
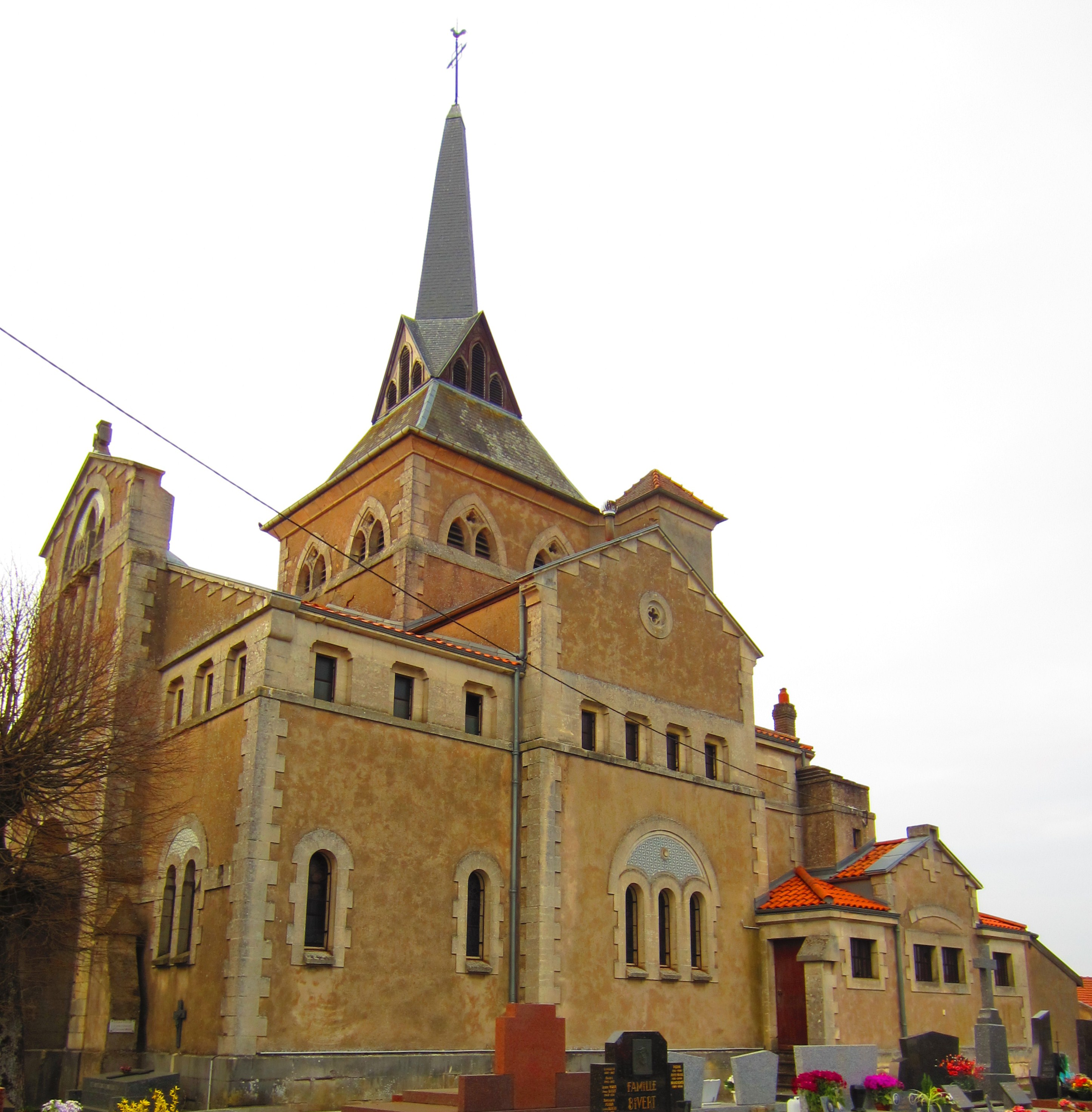
- St. John the Baptist's Church

- Coat of arms
- Location of Éton
- Location within France Location within Grand Est
- Coordinates: 49°16′59″N 5°40′01″E
- Country: France
- Region: Grand Est
- Department: Meuse
- Arrondissement: Verdun
- Canton: Bouligny
- Intercommunality: CC Damvillers Spincourt

Government
  - Mayor (2020–2026): Jean-Claude Jennesson
- Area^{1}: 11 km^{2} (4.2 sq mi)
- Elevation: 245 m (804 ft)
- Population (2023): 195
  - Density: 18/km^{2} (46/sq mi)
- Time zone: UTC+01:00 (CET)
  - Summer (DST): UTC+02:00 (CEST)
- INSEE/Postal code: 55182 /55240
- ^{1} French Land Register data, which excludes lakes, ponds, glaciers > 1 km^{2} (0.386 sq mi or 247 acres) and river estuaries.

Éton (French pronunciation: [etɔ̃]) is a commune in the Meuse department in Grand Est in north-eastern France.

== See also ==
- Communes of the Meuse department
