= Nouillonpont =

- Commune
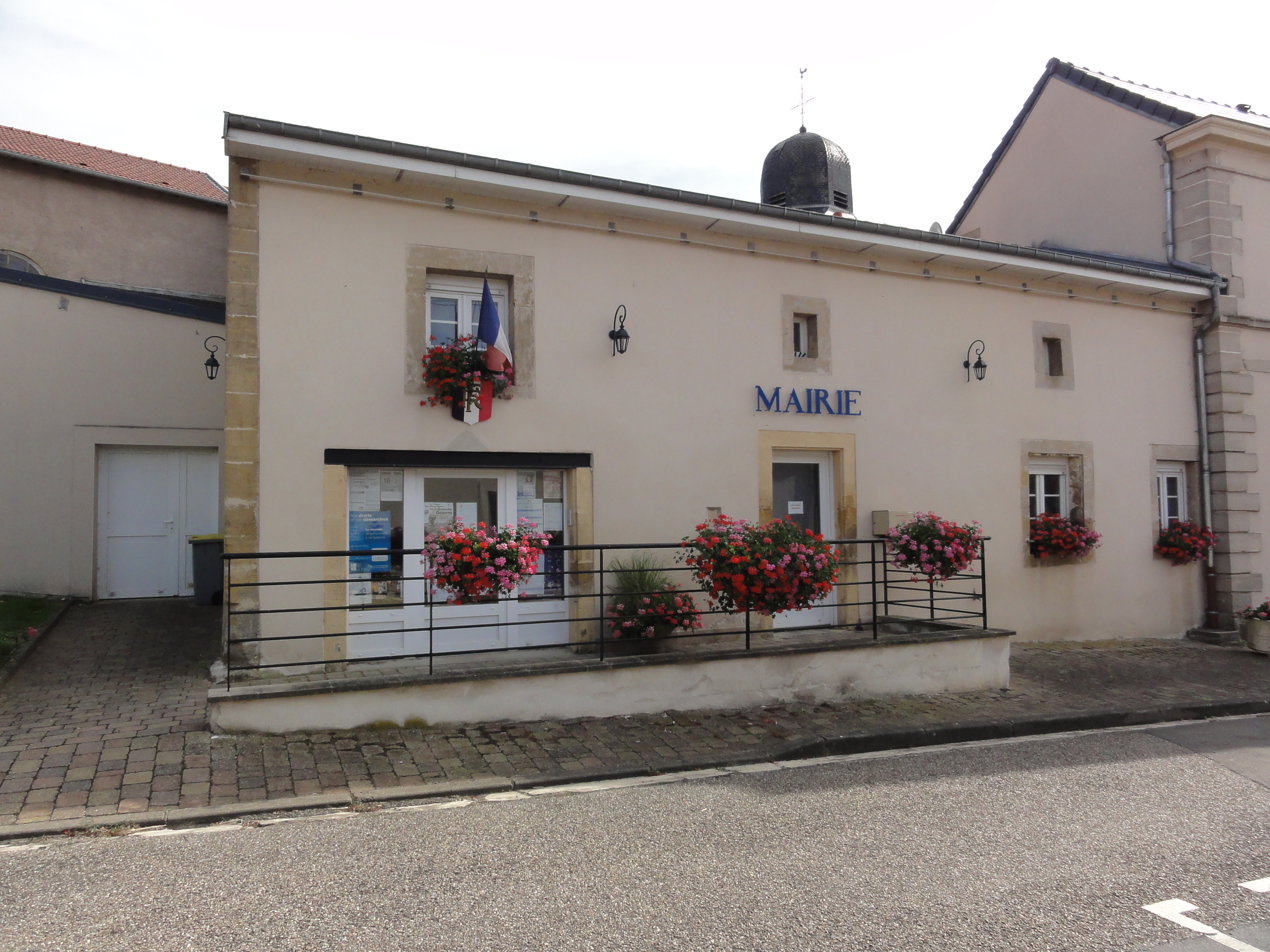
- The town hall in Nouillonpont

- Coat of arms
- Location of Nouillonpont
- Location within France Location within Grand Est
- Coordinates: 49°21′39″N 5°38′27″E
- Country: France
- Region: Grand Est
- Department: Meuse
- Arrondissement: Verdun
- Canton: Bouligny
- Intercommunality: CC Damvillers Spincourt

Government
  - Mayor (2020–2026): Thierry Mazet
- Area^{1}: 10.32 km^{2} (3.98 sq mi)
- Elevation: 225 m (738 ft)
- Population (2023): 243
  - Density: 23.5/km^{2} (61.0/sq mi)
- Time zone: UTC+01:00 (CET)
  - Summer (DST): UTC+02:00 (CEST)
- INSEE/Postal code: 55387 /55230
- ^{1} French Land Register data, which excludes lakes, ponds, glaciers > 1 km^{2} (0.386 sq mi or 247 acres) and river estuaries.

Nouillonpont (French pronunciation: [nujɔ̃pɔ̃]) is a commune in the Meuse department in Grand Est in north-eastern France.

== Geography ==
The village lies on the right bank of the Othain, which forms most of the commune's western border

== See also ==
- Communes of the Meuse department
