= Arrancy-sur-Crusnes =

- Commune
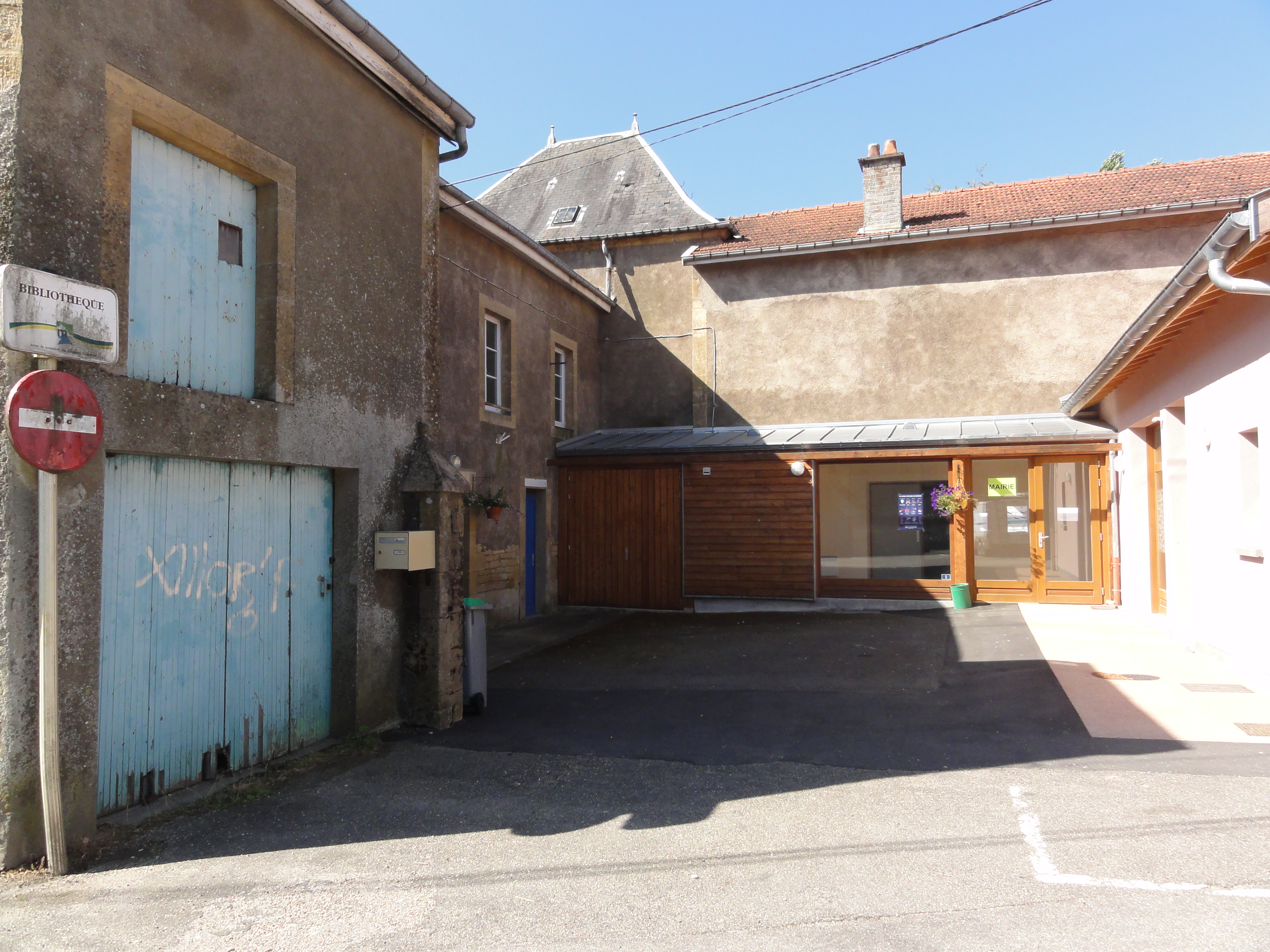
- The town hall in Arrancy-sur-Crusne

- Coat of arms
- Location of Arrancy-sur-Crusnes
- Location within France Location within Grand Est
- Coordinates: 49°24′51″N 5°39′33″E
- Country: France
- Region: Grand Est
- Department: Meuse
- Arrondissement: Verdun
- Canton: Bouligny
- Intercommunality: CC Damvillers Spincourt

Government
  - Mayor (2020–2026): Massimo Trinoli
- Area^{1}: 20.16 km^{2} (7.78 sq mi)
- Elevation: 288 m (945 ft)
- Highest elevation: 309 m (1,014 ft)
- Lowest elevation: 216 m (709 ft)
- Population (2023): 466
  - Density: 23.1/km^{2} (59.9/sq mi)
- Time zone: UTC+01:00 (CET)
  - Summer (DST): UTC+02:00 (CEST)
- INSEE/Postal code: 55013 /55230
- ^{1} French Land Register data, which excludes lakes, ponds, glaciers > 1 km^{2} (0.386 sq mi or 247 acres) and river estuaries.

Arrancy-sur-Crusnes (French pronunciation: [aʁɑ̃si syʁ kʁyn]; before 2022: Arrancy-sur-Crusne) is a commune in the Meuse department in the Grand Est region in northeastern France.

== Population ==
Historical population
Year	Pop.	±% p.a.
1968	447	—
1975	406	−1.36%
1982	361	−1.66%
1990	365	+0.14%
1999	322	−1.38%
2007	430	+3.68%
2012	486	+2.48%
2017	491	+0.20%
2023	466	−0.87%
Source: INSEE

== See also ==
- Communes of the Meuse department
