= Duzey =

- Commune
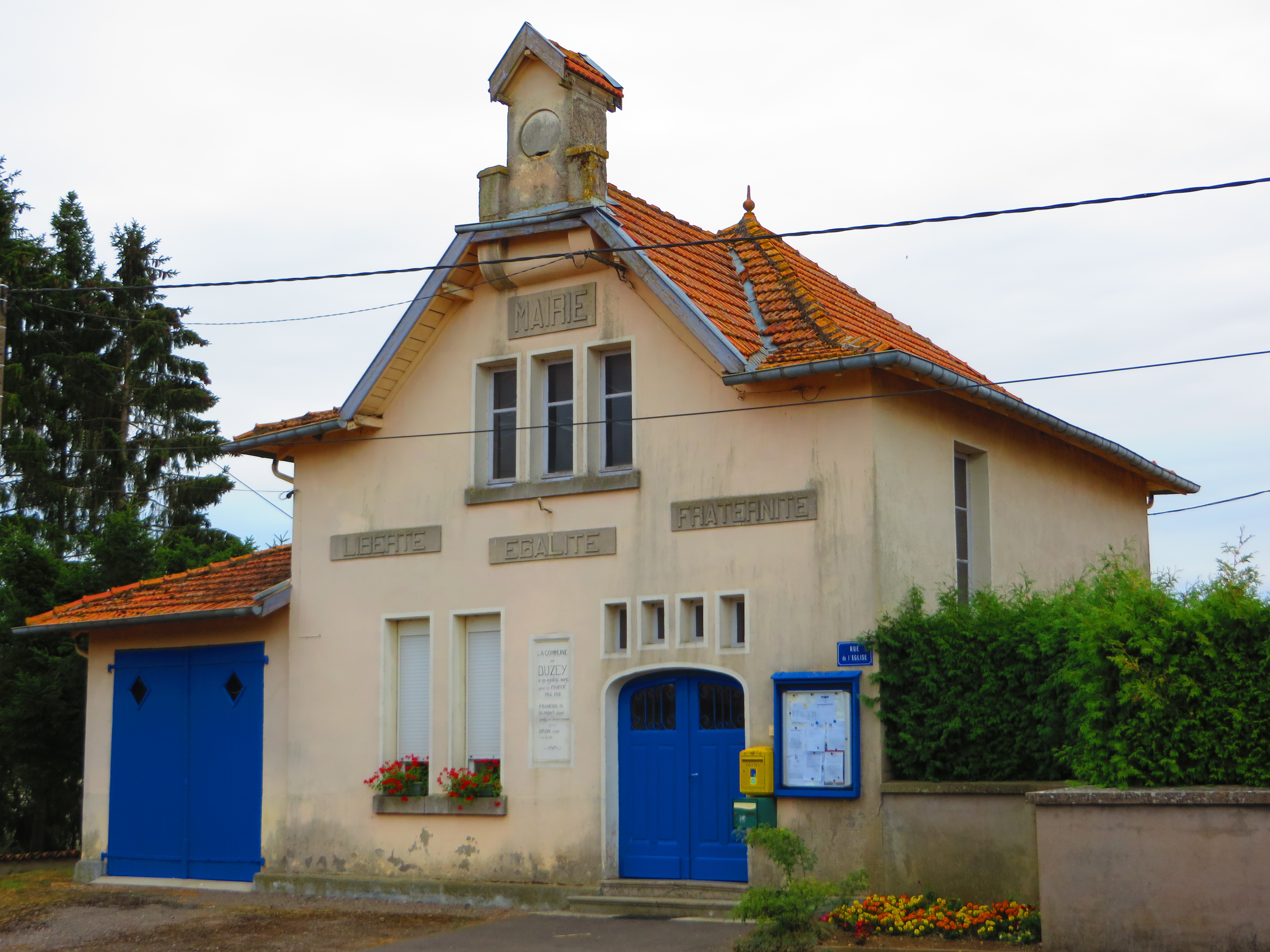
- The town hall in Duzey

- Coat of arms
- Location of Duzey
- Location within France Location within Grand Est
- Coordinates: 49°21′43″N 5°38′03″E
- Country: France
- Region: Grand Est
- Department: Meuse
- Arrondissement: Verdun
- Canton: Bouligny
- Intercommunality: CC Damvillers Spincourt

Government
  - Mayor (2020–2026): Dominique Gobert
- Area^{1}: 5.5 km^{2} (2.1 sq mi)
- Elevation: 222 m (728 ft)
- Highest elevation: 278 m (912 ft)
- Lowest elevation: 221 m (725 ft)
- Population (2023): 46
  - Density: 8.4/km^{2} (22/sq mi)
- Time zone: UTC+01:00 (CET)
  - Summer (DST): UTC+02:00 (CEST)
- INSEE/Postal code: 55168 /55230
- ^{1} French Land Register data, which excludes lakes, ponds, glaciers > 1 km^{2} (0.386 sq mi or 247 acres) and river estuaries.

Duzey (French pronunciation: [dyzɛ]) is a commune in the Meuse department in Grand Est in north-eastern France.

== Geography ==
The village lies on the left bank of the Othain, which flows northwestward through the north-eastern part of the commune.

== See also ==
- Communes of the Meuse department
