= Pillon, Meuse =

Pillon
- Commune
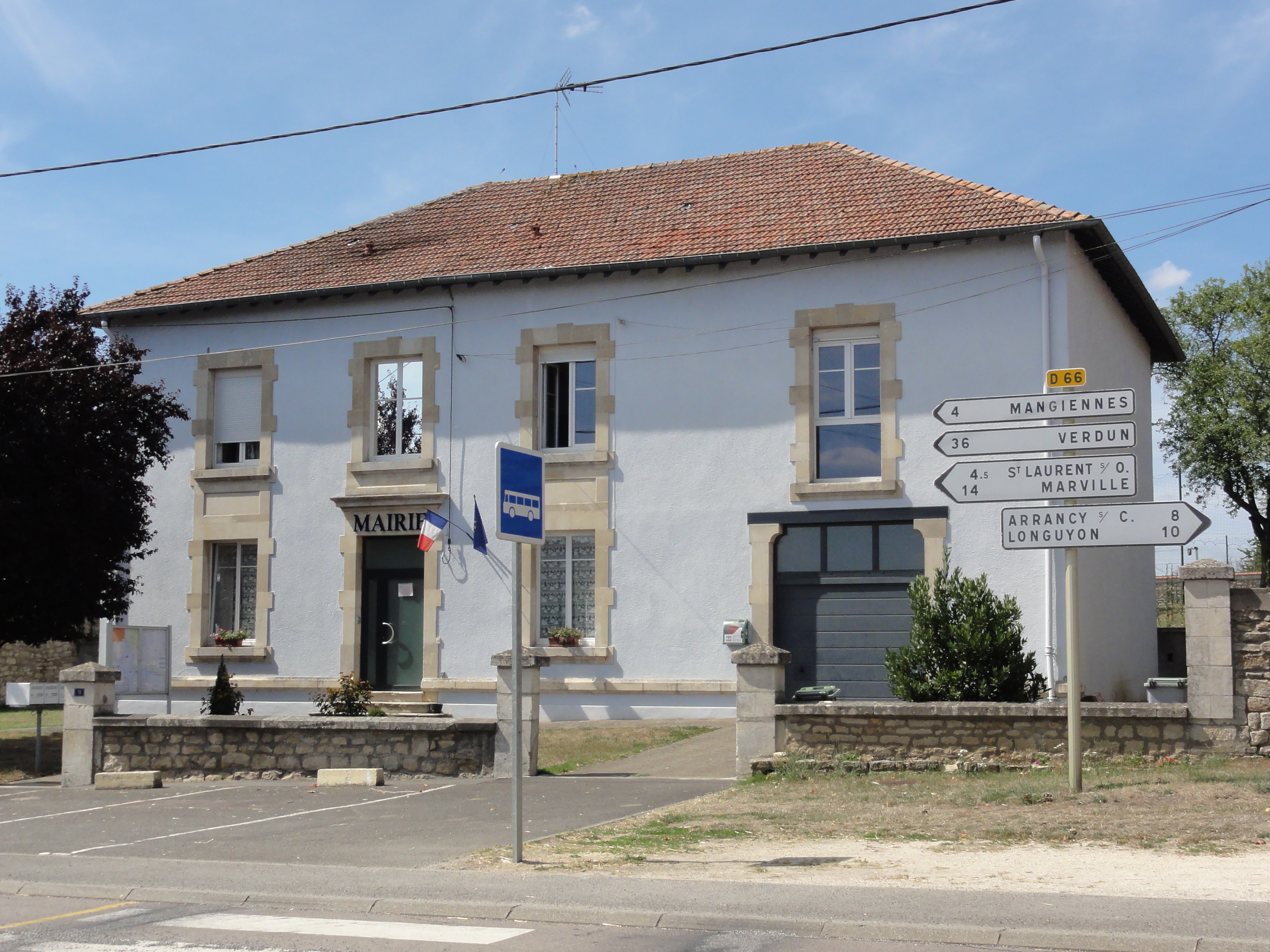
- The town hall in Pillon

- Coat of arms
- Location of Pillon
- Location within France Location within Grand Est
- Coordinates: 49°22′41″N 5°34′25″E
- Country: France
- Region: Grand Est
- Department: Meuse
- Arrondissement: Verdun
- Canton: Bouligny
- Intercommunality: CC Damvillers Spincourt

Government
  - Mayor (2020–2026): Christian Pergent
- Area^{1}: 15.69 km^{2} (6.06 sq mi)
- Highest elevation: 270 m (890 ft)
- Lowest elevation: 217 m (712 ft)
- Population (2023): 251
  - Density: 16.0/km^{2} (41.4/sq mi)
- Time zone: UTC+01:00 (CET)
  - Summer (DST): UTC+02:00 (CEST)
- INSEE/Postal code: 55405 /55230
- ^{1} French Land Register data, which excludes lakes, ponds, glaciers > 1 km^{2} (0.386 sq mi or 247 acres) and river estuaries.

Pillon is a commune in the Meuse department in Grand Est in north-eastern France.

== Geography ==
The river Othain forms most of the commune's eastern border.

== See also ==
- Communes of the Meuse department
