= Saint-Pierrevillers =

- Commune
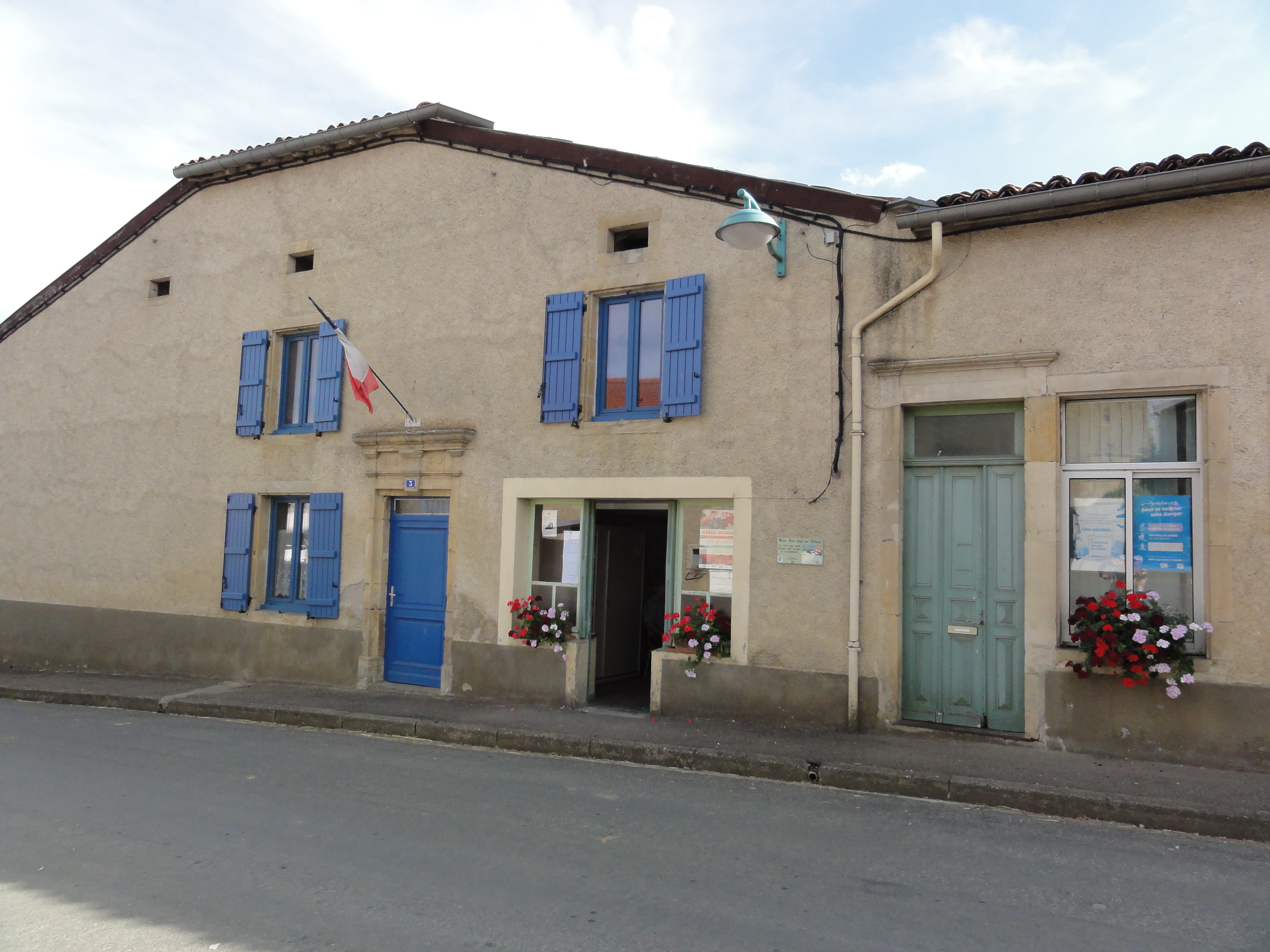
- The town hall in Saint-Pierrevillers

- Coat of arms
- Location of Saint-Pierrevillers
- Location within France Location within Grand Est
- Coordinates: 49°22′37″N 5°41′04″E
- Country: France
- Region: Grand Est
- Department: Meuse
- Arrondissement: Verdun
- Canton: Bouligny

Government
  - Mayor (2020–2026): Jean-Marie Missler
- Area^{1}: 10.6 km^{2} (4.1 sq mi)
- Population (2023): 149
  - Density: 14.1/km^{2} (36.4/sq mi)
- Time zone: UTC+01:00 (CET)
  - Summer (DST): UTC+02:00 (CEST)
- INSEE/Postal code: 55464 /55230
- ^{1} French Land Register data, which excludes lakes, ponds, glaciers > 1 km^{2} (0.386 sq mi or 247 acres) and river estuaries.

Saint-Pierrevillers (French pronunciation: [sɛ̃ pjɛʁvile]) is a commune in the Meuse department in Grand Est in north-eastern France.

== See also ==
- Communes of the Meuse department
