= Edward Impey =

British historian and archaeologist

Edward Impey FSA FRHistS
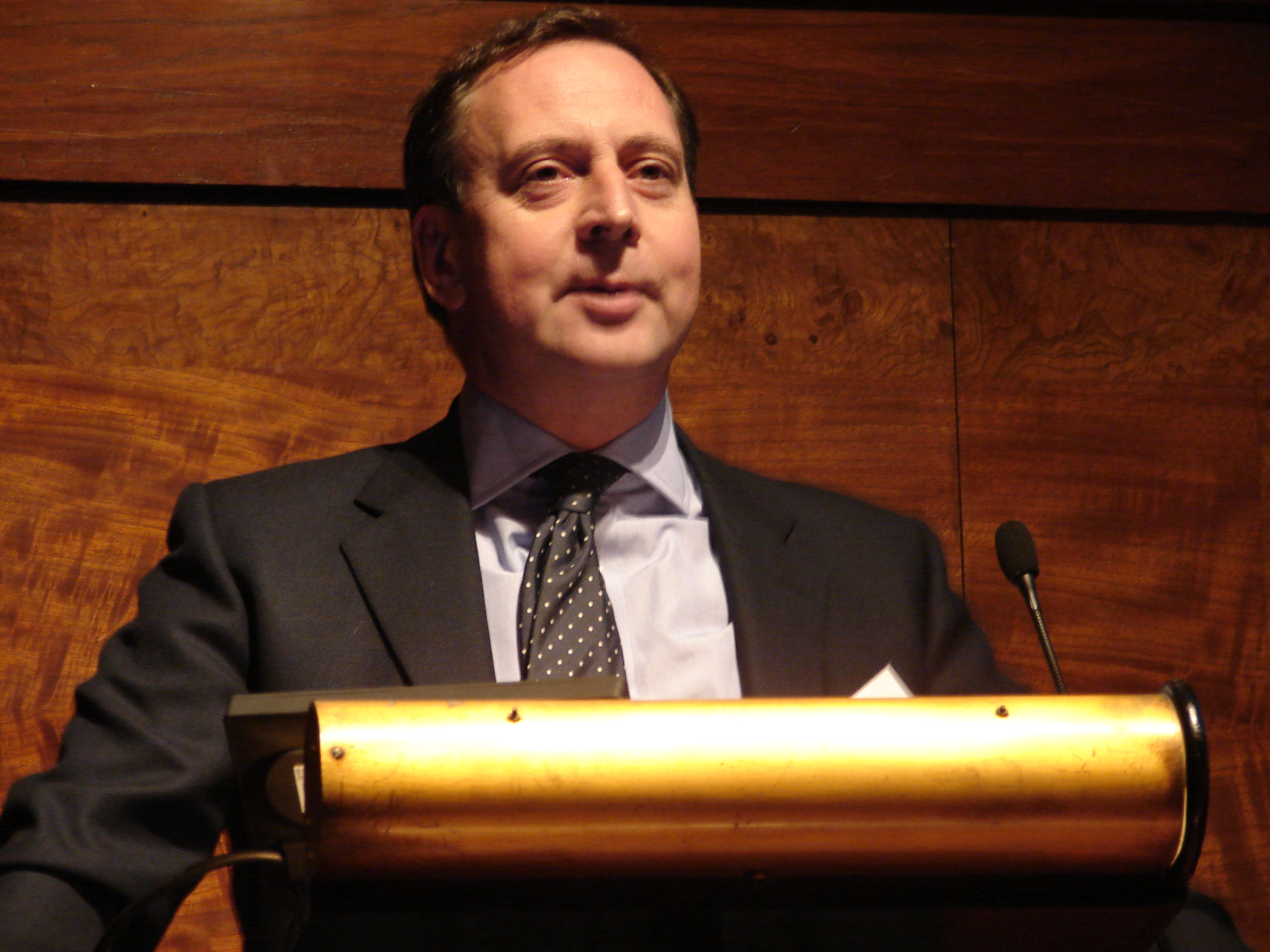
- Impey addressing a conference in 2010
- Born: Edward Alexander Impey; 28 May 1962 (age 64)
- Occupation: Museum director
- Known for: Director General of the Royal Armouries (2013—2022)
- Title: Master of the Armouries
- Spouse: Karen Lundgren (m. 2008)
- Children: Two
- Awards: Fellow of the Society of Antiquaries of London; Fellow of the Royal Historical Society

Academic background
- Education: Dragon School; Bedales School
- Alma mater: Oriel College, Oxford
- Thesis: The origins and development of non-conventual monastic dependencies in England and Normandy 1000–1350 (1991)

Academic work
- Discipline: History and archaeology

Edward Alexander Impey, FSA, FRHistS (born 28 May 1962) is a British historian, archaeologist, and museum curator. Between October 2013 and January 2022 he was Master of the Armouries and Director General of the Royal Armouries.

== Early life and education ==
Impey was born on 28 May 1962 to Oliver Impey and Jane Mellanby. His father was a zoologist by training who became specialist in Japanese art, and his mother was a neuroscientist. His grandfather Kenneth Mellanby was a biochemist. He grew up in the City of Oxford where his father was a curator at the Ashmolean Museum. He was educated at the Dragon School, a preparatory school in Oxford, and at Bedales School, a private school near Petersfield, Hampshire.

Impey has degrees in history and archaeology. He studied at Oriel College, Oxford, graduated with a Bachelor of Arts (BA) degree and a Master of Philosophy (MPhil) degree. At Oxford, the BA is promoted to a Master of Arts (MA Oxon) degree a number of years after graduating, and an MPhil is a two-year taught master's degree. He remained at the University of Oxford to undertake postgraduate research, and completed his Doctor of Philosophy (DPhil) degree in 1991. His doctoral thesis was titled The origins and development of non-conventual monastic dependencies in England and Normandy 1000–1350.

== Career ==
Impey worked as a curator at Historic Royal Palaces and served as Director of Heritage Protection and Planning at English Heritage. On 30 July 2013, he was announced as the next Master of the Armouries and Director General of the Royal Armouries. In 2022, however, he retired from this job and from work. He took up the appointments in October 2013 in succession to Lieutenant-General Jonathon Riley. Along with John Goodall, Impey is a patron of the Castle Studies Trust, a UK registered charity.

== Personal life ==
In 2008, Impey married Karen Lundgren. Together, they have two daughters.

== Honours ==
On 2 May 1996, Impey was elected a Fellow of the Society of Antiquaries of London (FSA). In 2011, he was elected a Fellow of the Royal Historical Society (FRHistS).

Cultural offices
Preceded by Lieutenant-General Jonathon Riley	Master of the Armouries; 2013 to 2022	Succeeded by Nat Edwards
