= Kenneth Mellanby =

English ecologist and entomologist

Major Kenneth Mellanby CBE (26 March 1908 – 23 December 1993) was an English ecologist and entomologist. He received the OBE for his work on the scabies mite.

== Life and work ==
Mellanby was educated at Barnard Castle School and then at King's College, Cambridge in Biology. He gained his PhD at the London School of Hygiene and Tropical Medicine on the ability of parasites to survive desiccation. He then worked as a Sorby Research Fellow of the Royal Society in Sheffield.

In the Second World War, he studied the control of scabies mite, an infection that was keeping thousands of soldiers in hospital. Mellanby meticulously counted all female mites that had burrowed into 886 soldiers, and determined that the average scabies sufferer harbours only 11.3 mites.

He carried out research on volunteers, mainly conscientious objectors, at the Sorby Research Institute, which he founded. He showed that the mite was largely unable to survive in bedding. He demonstrated that the disease is spread by the female mite and not males, immature forms, or eggs. He furthermore showed that a single treatment with benzyl benzoate provided a prompt cure. Based on his research, the ministry of health officially determined that disinfection of bedding and garments (known as 'stoving') was not required to properly treat scabies, thus saving the military an estimated half a million pounds per year. In 1945, he was awarded the OBE for this work.

Mellanby helped to found Nigeria's first university, the University of Ibadan, and was its first principal (1947–1953). Mellanby Hall, the university's first student hall of residence, is named after him.

On his return to England, he worked at the London School of Hygiene and Tropical Medicine and then became head of the Entomology Department at Rothamsted Experimental Station. In 1961, Mellanby founded and served as director of the Monks Wood Experimental Station, an ecological research center in Huntingdon, England. He started the journal Environmental Pollution in 1970, and was the author of many books.

Mellanby was a proponent for using DDT for the eradication of pests known to spread malaria. On p. 75 of his book The DDT Story, Mellanby famously wrote:

[The] consumption of smaller doses in the milligram range appears to be quite harmless. I know that I myself, when lecturing about DDT during the years immediately after World War II, frequently consumed a substantial pinch of DDT, to the consternation of the audience, but with no apparent harm to myself, either then or during the next 40 years.

Mellanby married twice. His first wife, Helen Nielson Dow Mellanby, was a biologist and medical doctor; they had a daughter, biochemist Jane Mellanby. One of his grandsons is curator Edward Impey.

== Bibliography ==
- Scabies. Oxford University Press, 1944. (2nd ed., Hampton, Classey, 1972. ISBN 0-900848-61-8)
- Human Guinea Pigs. London, Gollancz, 1945 (2nd, expanded, ed., London, Merlin Press, 1973. ISBN 0-85036-175-3)
- University College, Ibadan. The site and its acquisition. Ibadan, 1954
- The birth of Nigeria's university. London, Methuen, 1958
- Pesticides and Pollution. London, Collins, 1967. (2nd rev. ed., 1972. ISBN 0-00-213177-3)
- The Mole. London, Collins, 1971. New Naturalist monograph. ISBN 0-00-213145-5
- The Biology of Pollution. London, Edward Arnold, 1972. ISBN 0-7131-2380-X (2nd ed. 1980: ISBN 0-7131-2776-7)
- Can Britain feed itself? London, Merlin Press, 1975. ISBN 0-85036-194-X
- Talpa, the story of a mole. [Children's book]. London, Collins, 1976. ISBN 0-00-195504-7
- Farming and wildlife. London, Collins, 1981. ISBN 0-00-219239-X
- Air pollution, acid rain and the environment (ed. by Mellanby). London, Watt Committee on Energy. ISBN 1-85166-222-7
- The DDT story. Farnham, British Crop Protection Council, 1992. ISBN 0-948404-53-1
- Waste and Pollution. London, Harper Collins, 1992. ISBN 0-00-219182-2

== Sources ==
- Tekena Tamuno (1981). Ibadan Voices: Ibadan University in Transition. Ibadan University Press. ISBN 978-978-121-109-6.
- Kenneth Mellanby (1958). The birth of Nigeria's university. Methuen.
