= Foameix-Ornel =

- Commune
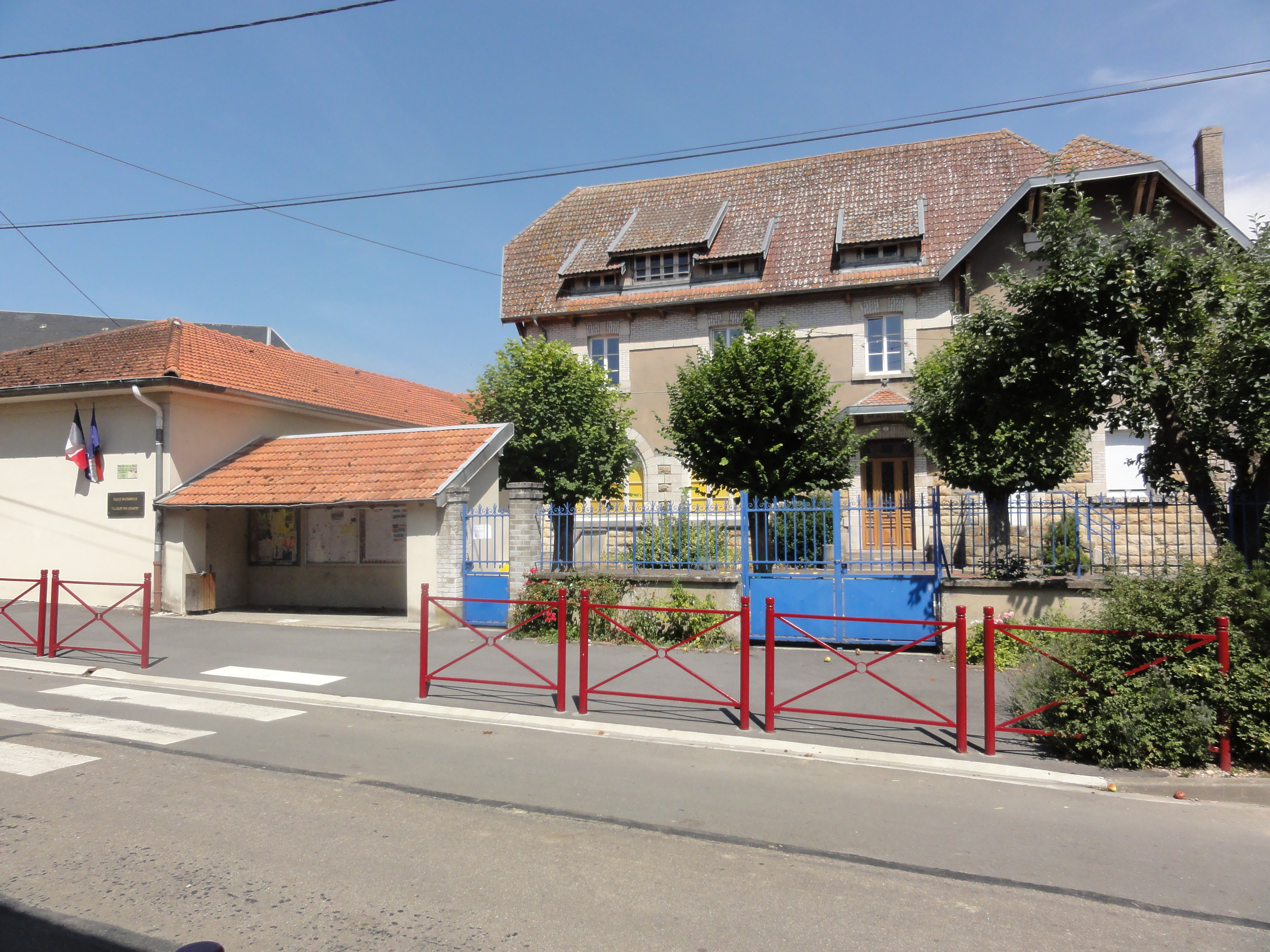
- The town hall in Foameix-Ornel

- Coat of arms
- Location of Foameix-Ornel
- Location within France Location within Grand Est
- Coordinates: 49°14′05″N 5°36′24″E
- Country: France
- Region: Grand Est
- Department: Meuse
- Arrondissement: Verdun
- Canton: Bouligny
- Intercommunality: Pays d'Étain

Government
  - Mayor (2020–2026): Gérard Christophe
- Area^{1}: 11.07 km^{2} (4.27 sq mi)
- Elevation: 222 m (728 ft)
- Highest elevation: 223 m (732 ft)
- Lowest elevation: 200 m (660 ft)
- Population (2023): 229
  - Density: 20.7/km^{2} (53.6/sq mi)
- Time zone: UTC+01:00 (CET)
  - Summer (DST): UTC+02:00 (CEST)
- INSEE/Postal code: 55191 /55400
- ^{1} French Land Register data, which excludes lakes, ponds, glaciers > 1 km^{2} (0.386 sq mi or 247 acres) and river estuaries.

Foameix-Ornel (French pronunciation: [fɔamɛ ɔʁnɛl]) is a commune in the Meuse department in Grand Est in north-eastern France. It was created in 1973 by the merger of two former communes: Foameix and Ornel.

== See also ==
- Communes of the Meuse department
