= Bouligny =

- Commune
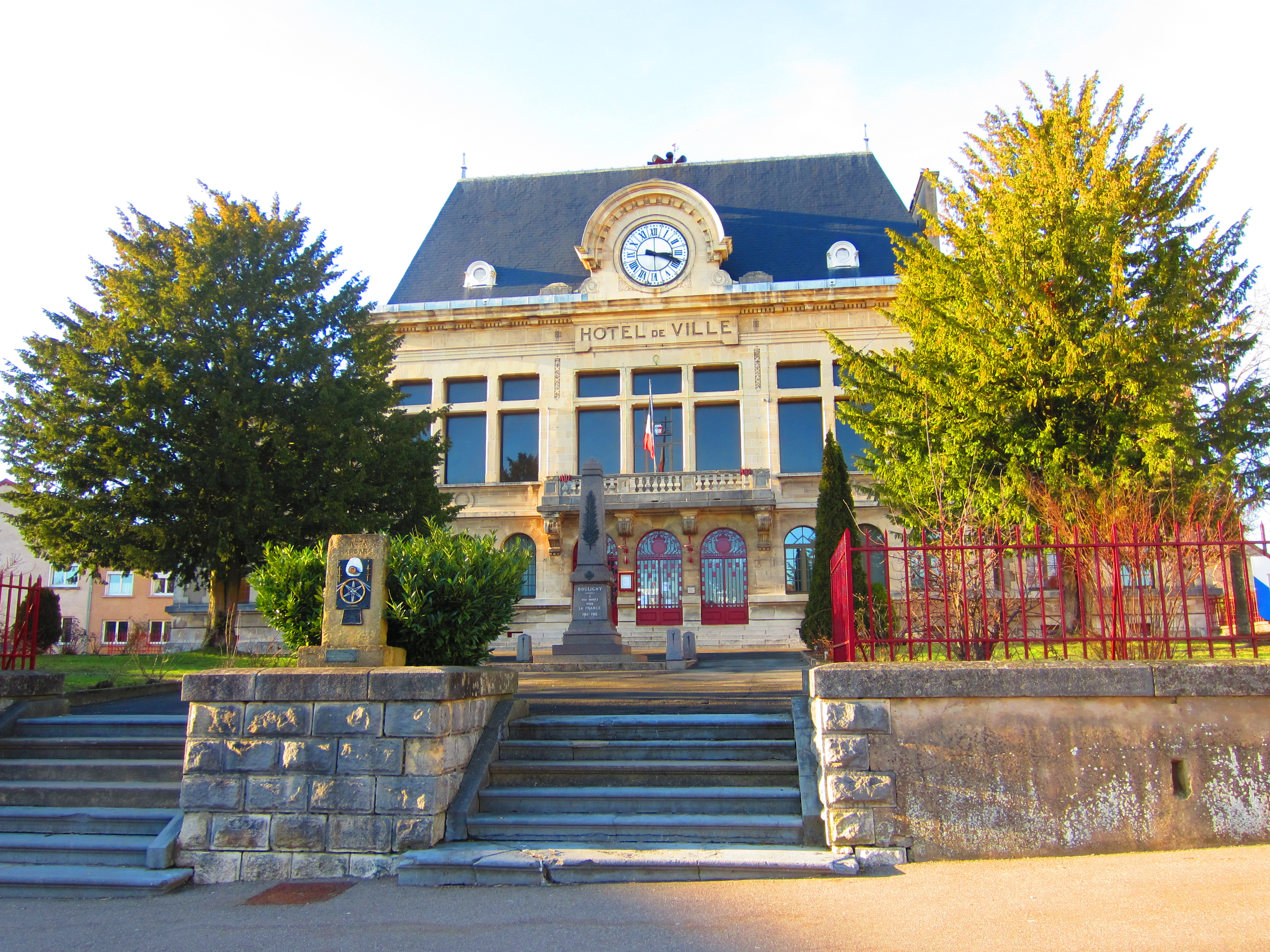
- The town hall in Bouligny

- Coat of arms
- Location of Bouligny
- Location within France Location within Grand Est
- Coordinates: 49°17′33″N 5°44′36″E
- Country: France
- Region: Grand Est
- Department: Meuse
- Arrondissement: Verdun
- Canton: Bouligny

Government
  - Mayor (2020–2026): Éric Bernardi
- Area^{1}: 10.99 km^{2} (4.24 sq mi)
- Elevation: 298 m (978 ft)
- Highest elevation: 316 m (1,037 ft)
- Lowest elevation: 238 m (781 ft)
- Population (2023): 2,507
  - Density: 228.1/km^{2} (590.8/sq mi)
- Time zone: UTC+01:00 (CET)
  - Summer (DST): UTC+02:00 (CEST)
- INSEE/Postal code: 55063 /55240
- ^{1} French Land Register data, which excludes lakes, ponds, glaciers > 1 km^{2} (0.386 sq mi or 247 acres) and river estuaries.

Bouligny (French pronunciation: [buliɲi]) is a commune in the Meuse department in Grand Est in northeastern France.

== Population ==
Historical population
Year	Pop.	±% p.a.
1968	4,647	—
1975	4,022	−2.04%
1982	3,575	−1.67%
1990	2,951	−2.37%
1999	2,813	−0.53%
2007	2,740	−0.33%
2012	2,697	−0.32%
2017	2,558	−1.05%
2023	2,507	−0.34%
Source: INSEE

== See also ==
- Communes of the Meuse department
