= Domremy-la-Canne =

- Commune
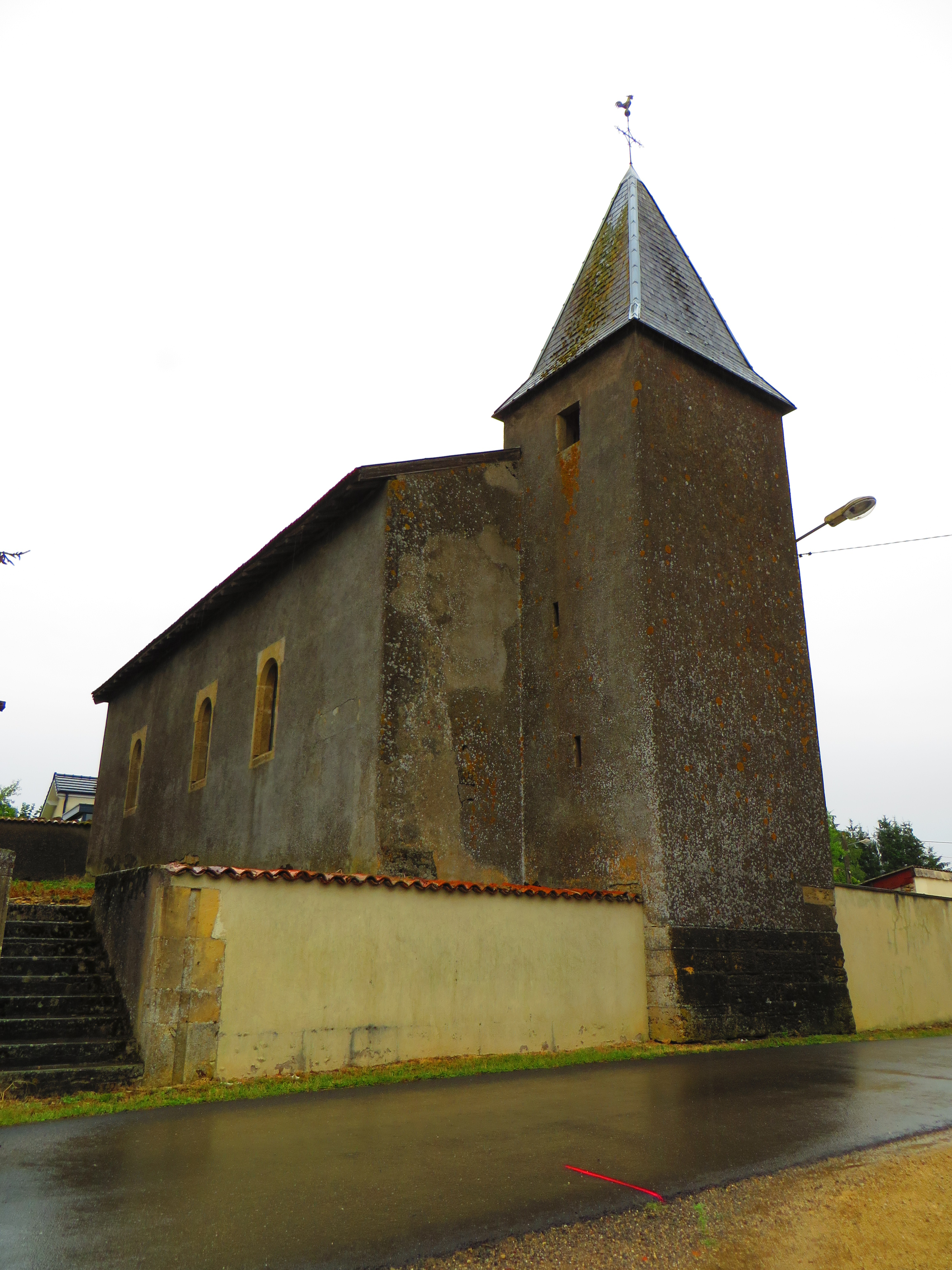
- The church in Domremy-la-Canne

- Coat of arms
- Location of Domremy-la-Canne
- Location within France Location within Grand Est
- Coordinates: 49°17′58″N 5°41′42″E
- Country: France
- Region: Grand Est
- Department: Meuse
- Arrondissement: Verdun
- Canton: Bouligny
- Intercommunality: CC Damvillers Spincourt

Government
  - Mayor (2020–2026): Jean-Paul Henry
- Area^{1}: 3.11 km^{2} (1.20 sq mi)
- Population (2023): 27
  - Density: 8.7/km^{2} (22/sq mi)
- Time zone: UTC+01:00 (CET)
  - Summer (DST): UTC+02:00 (CEST)
- INSEE/Postal code: 55162 /55240
- ^{1} French Land Register data, which excludes lakes, ponds, glaciers > 1 km^{2} (0.386 sq mi or 247 acres) and river estuaries.

Domremy-la-Canne (French pronunciation: [dɔ̃ʁemi la kan]) is a commune in the Meuse department in Grand Est in north-eastern France.

It is a small village of 35 inhabitants (2018). Located at 240 metres altitude, Domremy-la-Canne extends 3 km ². The mayor appoints Jean-Paul Henry.

== Geography ==
The village lies in the middle of the commune, on the right bank of the Othain, which flows northwestward through the commune.

== See also ==
- Communes of the Meuse department
