= Jane Mellanby =

British neuroscientist (1938–2021)

- Born: 14 April 1938; Sheffield, England
- Died: 8 February 2021 (aged 82)
- Occupations: Neuroscientist, academic
- Children: 4, including Edward Impey
- Parent: Kenneth Mellanby
- Relatives: Edward Mellanby (uncle)

Jane H. F. Mellanby (14 April 1938 – 8 February 2021) was a British neuroscientist and academic. She was a doctoral student of biochemist Hans Krebs, and was a fellow at St. Hilda's College, Oxford from 1971 to 2006.

== Early life ==
Mellanby was born in Sheffield, the daughter of entomologist Kenneth Mellanby and Canadian-born biomedical researcher Agnes Helen Nielson Dow Mellanby. Her uncle was biochemist Edward Mellanby. She read botany, physiology and chemistry at Somerville College, Oxford. In 1962, she completed doctoral studies in biochemistry at Oxford with Hans Krebs as her advisor.

== Career ==
Mellanby worked on tetanospasmin and botulinum toxins as a postdoctoral research associate at Sir William Dunn School of Pathology. In 1970, she and Larry Weiskrantz founded the Neurochemistry unit in Oxford's Experimental Psychology department. She was a Fellow at St. Hilda's College, Oxford from 1971. From 1977 to 2006, she was an Official Fellow in Experimental Psychology at St. Hilda's; she was also vice-principal of the college, from 1990 to 1996. In 2016, she was elected an honorary fellow of the Royal College of Physicians.

Mellanby's research included a focus on temporal lobe epilepsy. She took a particular interest in secondary education and served as a governor of a local comprehensive school. She helped to develop the VESPARCH test for evaluating verbal and spatial reasoning skills in students, as director of the Oxford Group For Children's Potential. She also studied gender differences in undergraduate science education. Her research appeared in academic journals including Nature, Neuroscience, Journal of Physiology, Journal of Psychopharmacology, British Journal of Psychology, Journal of Deaf Studies and Deaf Education, Higher Education, Biochemical Journal, and Medical Teacher.

== Publications ==
- "Enzymic determination of d(−)-β-hydroxybutyric acid and acetoacetic acid in blood" (1962, with Dermot H. Williamson and Hans A. Krebs)
- "The equilibrium constant of the β-hydroxybutyric-dehydrogenase system" (1962, with Dermot H. Williamson and Hans A. Krebs)
- "Specific Precocious Protective Action of Toxoids" (1964, with W. E. van Heyningen)
- "The effect of tetanus toxin in the goldfish" (1971, with J. Diamond)
- "The effect of tetanus toxin at the neuromuscular junction in the goldfish" (1972, with P. A. Thompson)
- "A note on the specific fixation, specific deactivation and non-specific inactivation of bacterial toxins by gangliosides" (1973, with W. E. van Heyningen)
- "D-(–)-3-Hydroxybutyrate" (1974, with Dermot H. Williamson)
- "How does tetanus toxin act?" (1981, with Jane Green)
- "The effect of Ro 15-4513, an inverse agonist at the benzodiazepine receptor, on the exploratory response to novelty in the playground maze" (1994, with Briony Nicholls and Stephen Smith)
- "The 'gender gap' in final examination results at Oxford University" (2000, with Maryanne Martin and John O'Doherty)
- "Attitudes to e-learning, learning style and achievement in learning neuroanatomy by medical students" (2008, with Elena Svirko)
- "Deep learning questions can help selection of high ability candidates for universities" (2009, with Mario Cortino-Borja and John Stein)
- "Verbal and Spatial Analogical Reasoning in Deaf and Hearing Children: The Role of Grammar and Vocabulary" (2011, with Lindsey Edwards, Berta Figueras, and Dawn Langdon)
- "Trait anxiety and final degree performance at the University of Oxford" (2011, with Anna Zimdars)
- Education and Learning: An Evidence–based Approach (2014, with Katy Theobald)
- "Teaching neuroanatomy using computer-aided learning: What makes for successful outcomes?" (2017, with Elena Svirko)

== Personal life ==
Mellanby married zoologist and curator Oliver R. Impey in 1961. They had four children, including Edward Impey. She was widowed when Impey died in 2005; she died from cancer in 2021, aged 82 years.
