= Gouraincourt =

- Commune
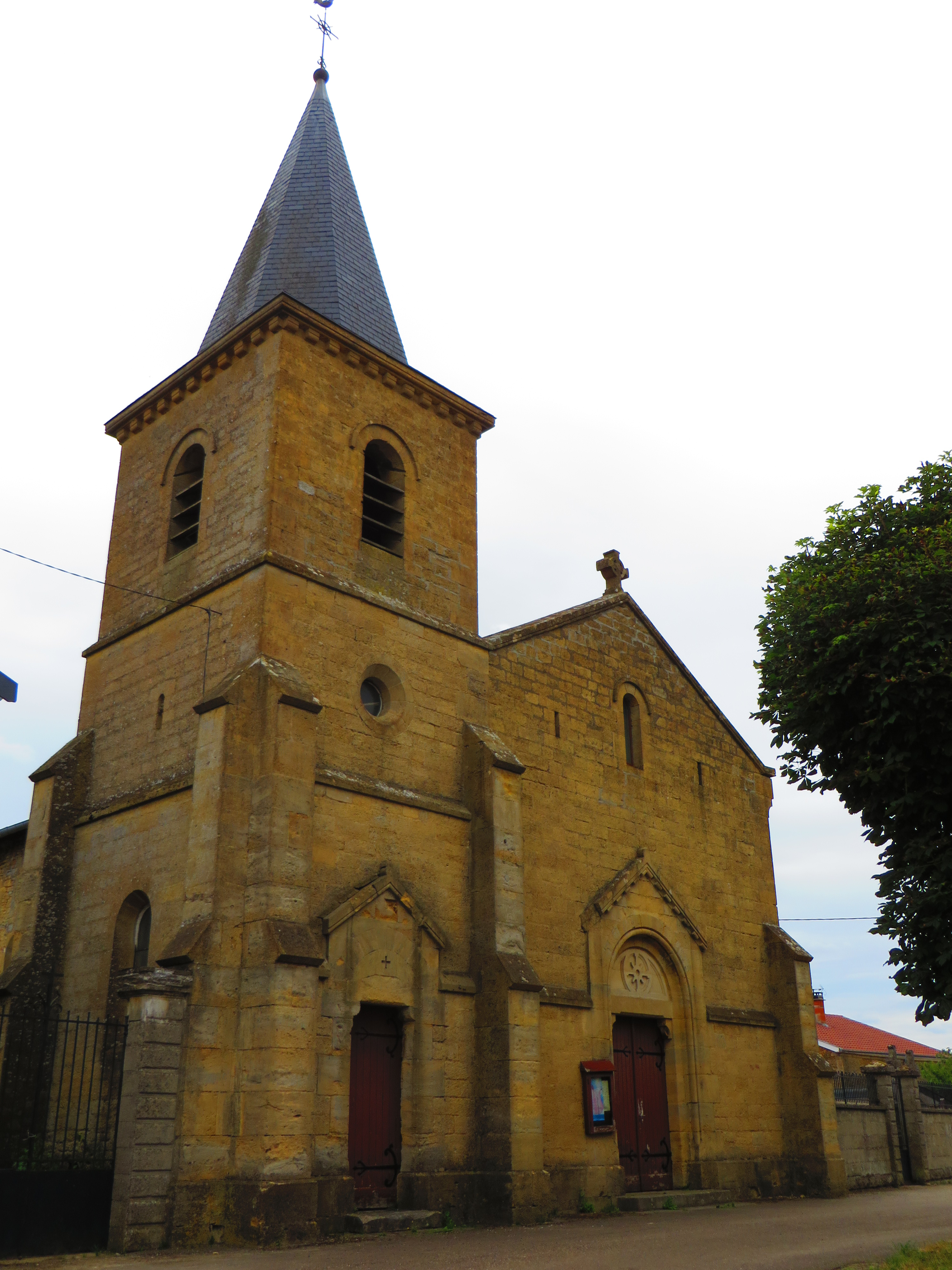
- The church in Gouraincourt
- Location of Gouraincourt
- Location within France Location within Grand Est
- Coordinates: 49°17′42″N 5°39′49″E
- Country: France
- Region: Grand Est
- Department: Meuse
- Arrondissement: Verdun
- Canton: Bouligny
- Intercommunality: CC Damvillers Spincourt

Government
  - Mayor (2020–2026): Jean Lambert
- Area^{1}: 5.71 km^{2} (2.20 sq mi)
- Elevation: 250 m (820 ft)
- Population (2023): 73
  - Density: 13/km^{2} (33/sq mi)
- Time zone: UTC+01:00 (CET)
  - Summer (DST): UTC+02:00 (CEST)
- INSEE/Postal code: 55216 /55230
- ^{1} French Land Register data, which excludes lakes, ponds, glaciers > 1 km^{2} (0.386 sq mi or 247 acres) and river estuaries.

Gouraincourt (French pronunciation: [ɡuʁɛ̃kuʁ]) is a commune in the Meuse department in Grand Est in north-eastern France.

== Geography ==
The river Othain forms part of the commune's north-eastern border.

== See also ==
- Communes of the Meuse department
