= Dommary-Baroncourt =

- Commune
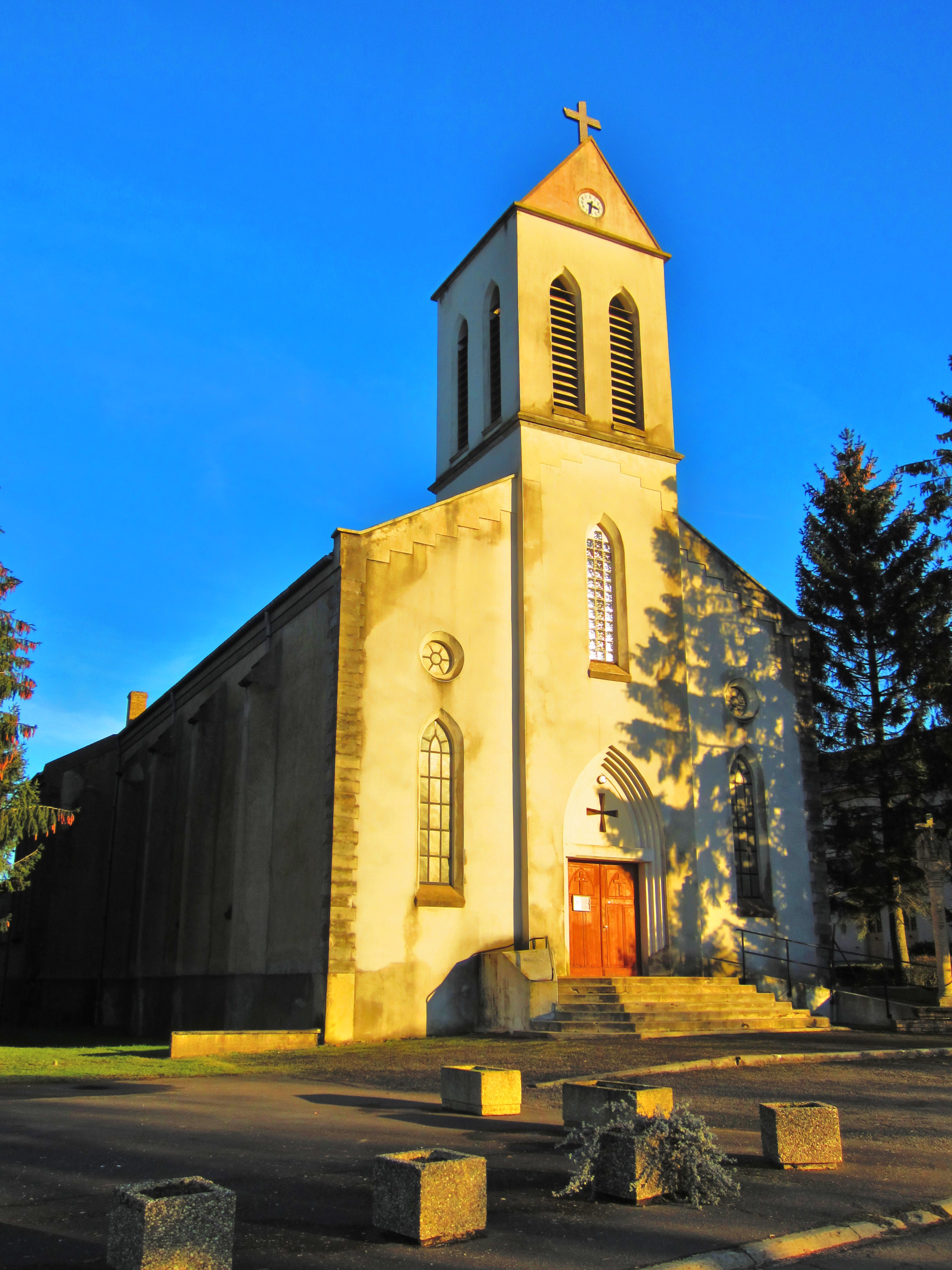
- The church in Dommary-Baroncourt

- Coat of arms
- Location of Dommary-Baroncourt
- Location within France Location within Grand Est
- Coordinates: 49°17′N 5°42′E
- Country: France
- Region: Grand Est
- Department: Meuse
- Arrondissement: Verdun
- Canton: Bouligny
- Intercommunality: CC Damvillers Spincourt

Government
  - Mayor (2020–2026): Christophe Caput
- Area^{1}: 12.49 km^{2} (4.82 sq mi)
- Elevation: 240 m (790 ft)
- Highest elevation: 291 m (955 ft)
- Lowest elevation: 235 m (771 ft)
- Population (2023): 753
  - Density: 60.3/km^{2} (156/sq mi)
- Time zone: UTC+01:00 (CET)
  - Summer (DST): UTC+02:00 (CEST)
- INSEE/Postal code: 55158 /55240
- ^{1} French Land Register data, which excludes lakes, ponds, glaciers > 1 km^{2} (0.386 sq mi or 247 acres) and river estuaries.

Dommary-Baroncourt (French pronunciation: [dɔmaʁi baʁɔ̃kuʁ]) is a commune in the Meuse department in Grand Est in north-eastern France.

== Geography ==
The river Othain flows northwestward through the commune and crosses the village.

== See also ==
- Communes of the Meuse department
