= Canton of Bouligny =

Coordinates: 49.29°N 5.74°E

The canton of Bouligny is an administrative division of the Meuse department, northeastern France. It was created at the French canton reorganisation which came into effect in March 2015. Its seat is in Bouligny.

It consists of the following communes:

1. Amel-sur-l'Étang
2. Arrancy-sur-Crusnes
3. Billy-sous-Mangiennes
4. Bouligny
5. Dommary-Baroncourt
6. Domremy-la-Canne
7. Duzey
8. Éton
9. Foameix-Ornel
10. Gouraincourt
11. Lanhères
12. Loison
13. Mangiennes
14. Morgemoulin
15. Muzeray
16. Nouillonpont
17. Pillon
18. Rouvres-en-Woëvre
19. Rouvrois-sur-Othain
20. Saint-Laurent-sur-Othain
21. Saint-Pierrevillers
22. Senon
23. Sorbey
24. Spincourt
25. Vaudoncourt
26. Villers-lès-Mangiennes
