= Morgemoulin =

- Commune
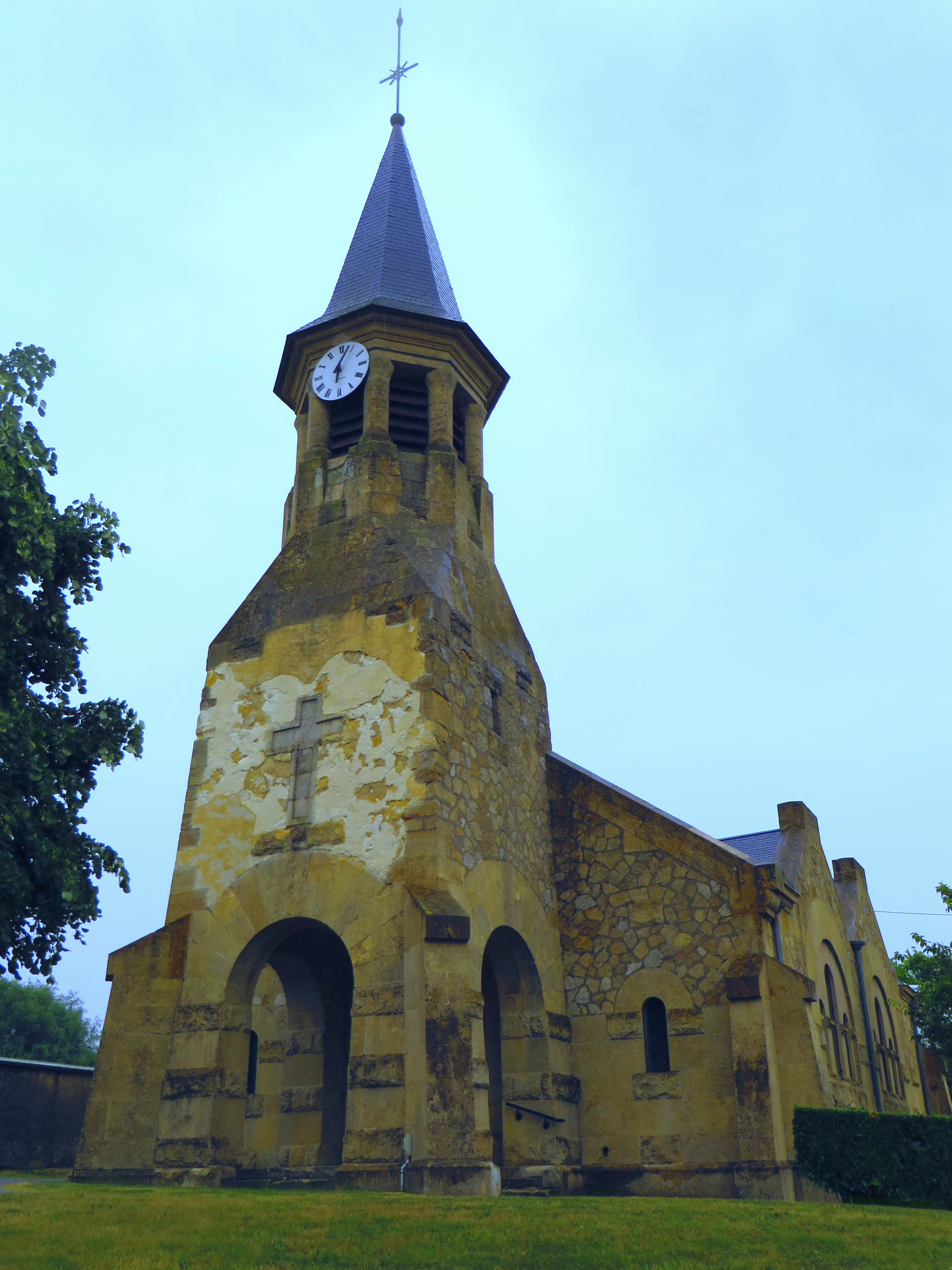
- The church in Morgemoulin
- Location of Morgemoulin
- Location within France Location within Grand Est
- Coordinates: 49°14′05″N 5°34′55″E
- Country: France
- Region: Grand Est
- Department: Meuse
- Arrondissement: Verdun
- Canton: Bouligny
- Intercommunality: CC du pays d'Étain

Government
  - Mayor (2020–2026): Michel Leturc
- Area^{1}: 6.85 km^{2} (2.64 sq mi)
- Elevation: 210 m (690 ft)
- Highest elevation: 227 m (745 ft)
- Lowest elevation: 205 m (673 ft)
- Population (2023): 109
  - Density: 15.9/km^{2} (41.2/sq mi)
- Time zone: UTC+01:00 (CET)
  - Summer (DST): UTC+02:00 (CEST)
- INSEE/Postal code: 55357 /55400
- ^{1} French Land Register data, which excludes lakes, ponds, glaciers > 1 km^{2} (0.386 sq mi or 247 acres) and river estuaries.

Morgemoulin (French pronunciation: [mɔʁʒəmulɛ̃]) is a commune in the Meuse department in Grand Est in north-eastern France.

The village's name comes from the mill belonging to the family "Morge" in 1610. It was destroyed during the 1914-1918 war and rebuilt.

== See also ==
- Communes of the Meuse department
