= Lanhères =

- Commune
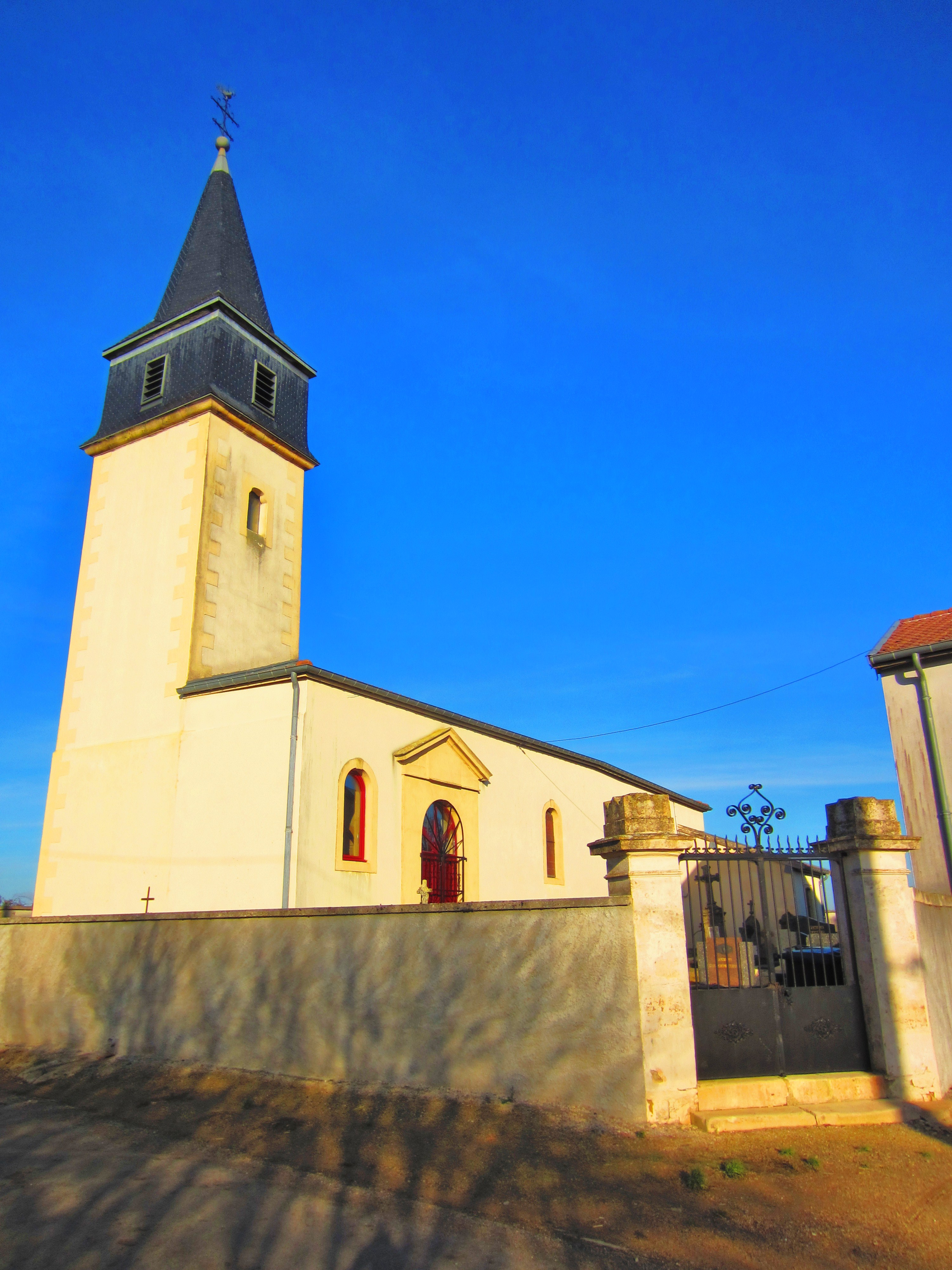
- The church in Lanhères

- Coat of arms
- Location of Lanhères
- Location within France Location within Grand Est
- Coordinates: 49°12′24″N 5°42′50″E
- Country: France
- Region: Grand Est
- Department: Meuse
- Arrondissement: Verdun
- Canton: Bouligny
- Intercommunality: CC du pays d'Étain

Government
  - Mayor (2020–2026): Jean-Michel Nicolas
- Area^{1}: 4.6 km^{2} (1.8 sq mi)
- Elevation: 214 m (702 ft)
- Highest elevation: 240 m (790 ft)
- Lowest elevation: 200 m (660 ft)
- Population (2023): 54
  - Density: 12/km^{2} (30/sq mi)
- Time zone: UTC+01:00 (CET)
  - Summer (DST): UTC+02:00 (CEST)
- INSEE/Postal code: 55280 /55400
- ^{1} French Land Register data, which excludes lakes, ponds, glaciers > 1 km^{2} (0.386 sq mi or 247 acres) and river estuaries.

Lanhères (French pronunciation: [lanɛʁ]) is a commune in the Meuse department in Grand Est in north-eastern France.

== See also ==
- Communes of the Meuse department
