= Amel-sur-l'Étang =

- Commune
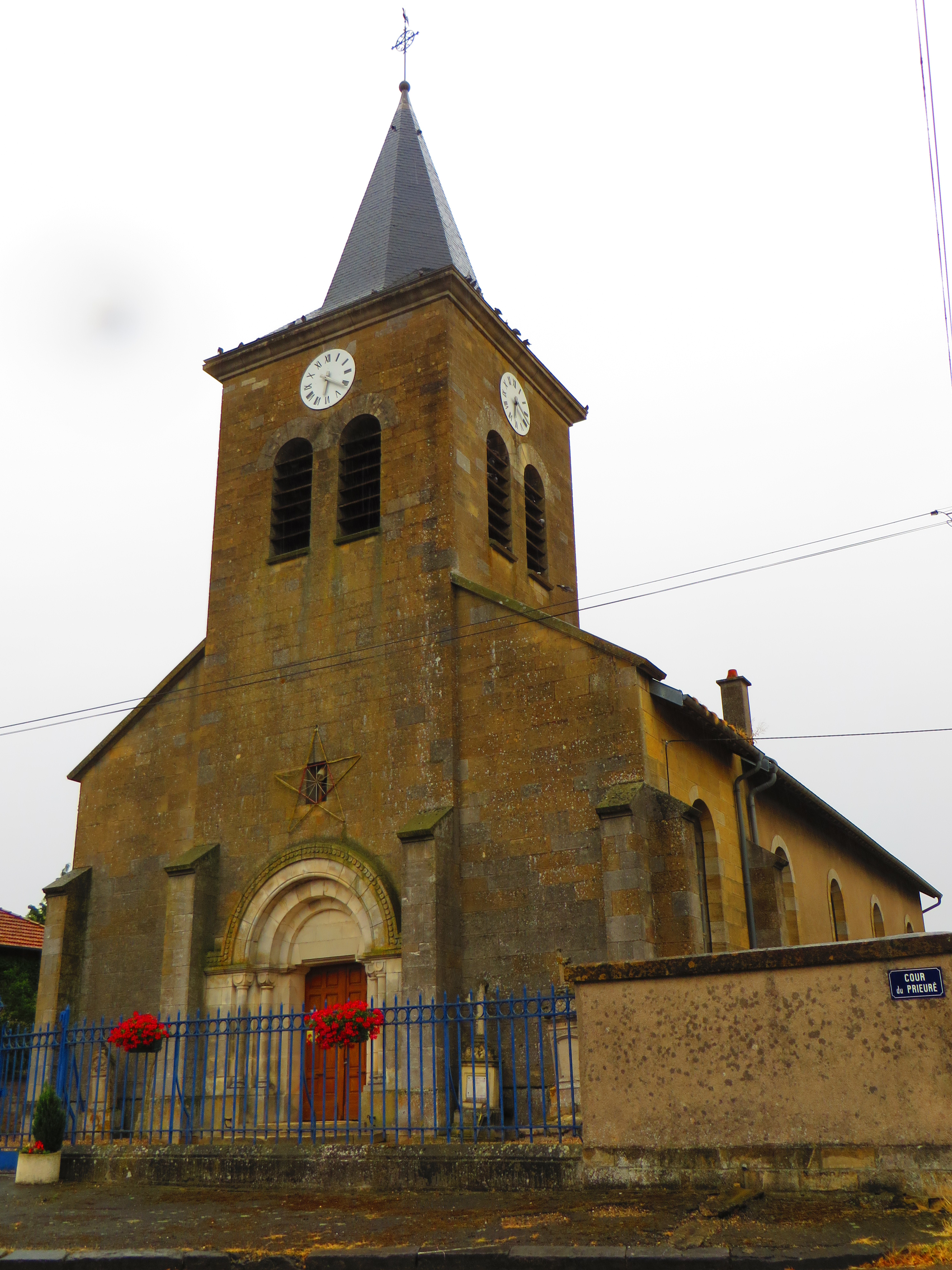
- The church in Amel-sur-l'Étang

- Coat of arms
- Location of Amel-sur-l'Étang
- Location within France Location within Grand Est
- Coordinates: 49°16′02″N 5°38′57″E
- Country: France
- Region: Grand Est
- Department: Meuse
- Arrondissement: Verdun
- Canton: Bouligny
- Intercommunality: Damvillers Spincourt

Government
  - Mayor (2020–2026): Nicolas Birckel
- Area^{1}: 14.74 km^{2} (5.69 sq mi)
- Elevation: 252 m (827 ft)
- Highest elevation: 256 m (840 ft)
- Lowest elevation: 205 m (673 ft)
- Population (2023): 153
  - Density: 10.4/km^{2} (26.9/sq mi)
- Time zone: UTC+01:00 (CET)
  - Summer (DST): UTC+02:00 (CEST)
- INSEE/Postal code: 55008 /55230
- ^{1} French Land Register data, which excludes lakes, ponds, glaciers > 1 km^{2} (0.386 sq mi or 247 acres) and river estuaries.

Amel-sur-l'Étang (French pronunciation: [amɛl syʁ letɑ̃]) is a commune in the Meuse department in the Grand Est region in northeastern France.

== Population ==
Historical population
Year	Pop.	±% p.a.
1968	227	—
1975	192	−2.36%
1982	168	−1.89%
1990	132	−2.97%
1999	150	+1.43%
2007	166	+1.27%
2012	176	+1.18%
2017	151	−3.02%
2023	153	+0.22%
Source: INSEE

== See also ==
- Communes of the Meuse department
