= Vaudoncourt, Meuse =

Vaudoncourt
- Commune
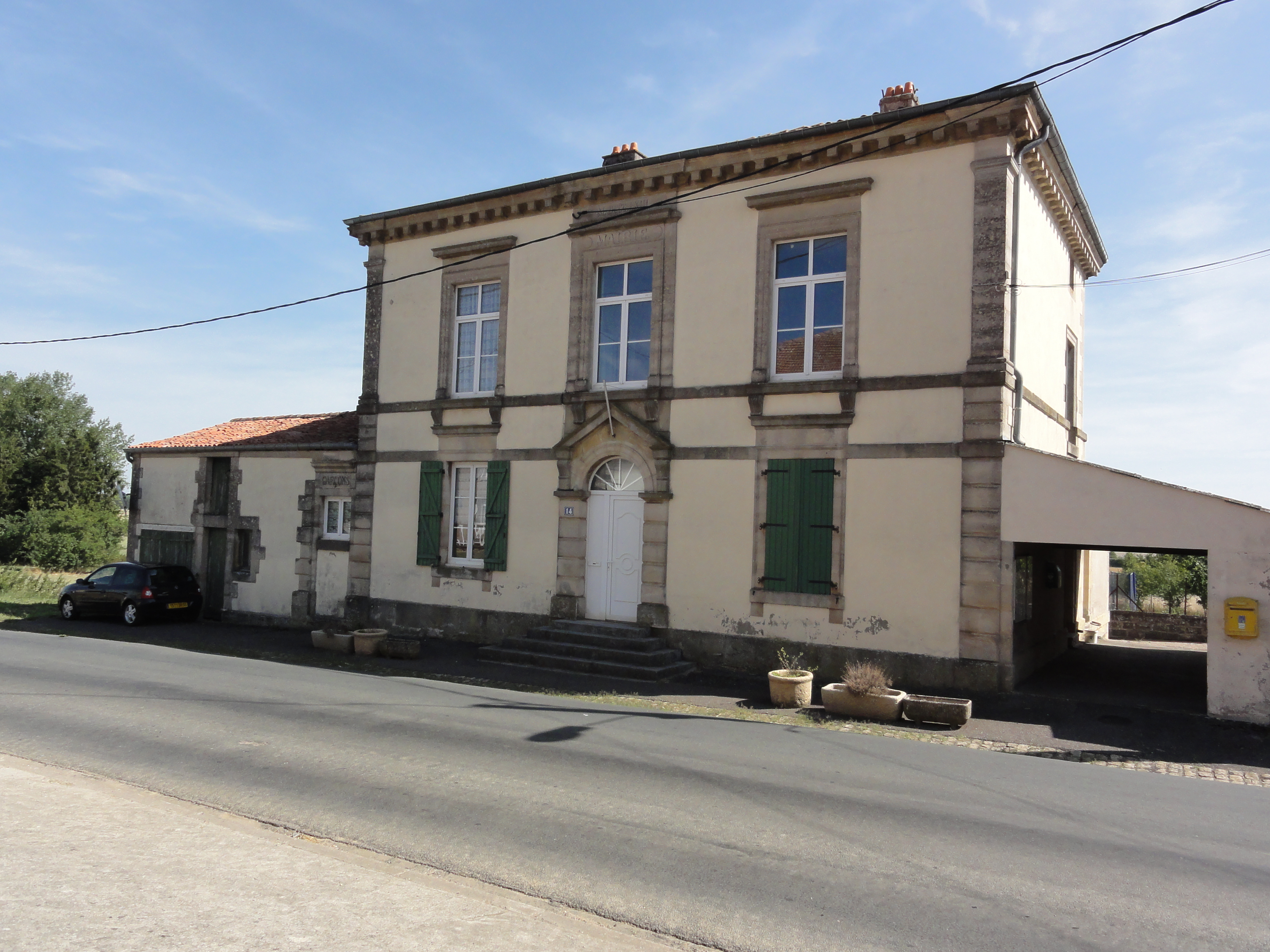
- The town hall in Vaudoncourt

- Coat of arms
- Location of Vaudoncourt
- Location within France Location within Grand Est
- Coordinates: 49°19′11″N 5°38′55″E
- Country: France
- Region: Grand Est
- Department: Meuse
- Arrondissement: Verdun
- Canton: Bouligny
- Intercommunality: CC Damvillers Spincourt

Government
  - Mayor (2020–2026): Marie-Odile Francois
- Area^{1}: 6.18 km^{2} (2.39 sq mi)
- Elevation: 240 m (790 ft)
- Population (2023): 79
  - Density: 13/km^{2} (33/sq mi)
- Time zone: UTC+01:00 (CET)
  - Summer (DST): UTC+02:00 (CEST)
- INSEE/Postal code: 55535 /55230
- ^{1} French Land Register data, which excludes lakes, ponds, glaciers > 1 km^{2} (0.386 sq mi or 247 acres) and river estuaries.

Vaudoncourt (French pronunciation: [vodɔ̃kuʁ]) is a commune in the Meuse department in Grand Est in north-eastern France.

== Geography ==
The river Othain forms part of the commune's north-eastern border.

== See also ==
- Communes of the Meuse department
