= Sörby =

Sörby or Sørby may refer to:

== Places ==
- Sörby (Öland), a village in Sweden
- Sörby, Västergötland, a former parish in Sweden for which Floby station was first named
- Sørby, a village in Tønsberg Municipality in Vestfold county, Norway

== People ==
- Kari Sørby, a Norwegian television news anchor
- Kristin Sørby, maiden name of Kristin Vinje
- Mrs. Sørby, a character in the play The Wild Duck by the Norwegian playwright Henrik Ibsen

== Other ==
- Sörby IK, a Swedish football club; see Swedish Football Division 7

== See also ==
- Sorby
- Sarby
- Sørbyhaugen (station)
