= Milling yield =

Milling yield is the percentage of finished product obtained from the milling of a cereal crop.

Wheat milling yield is the percent of flour obtained from a given unit of whole wheat kernels (flour yield or flour extraction rate), averaging 70-75% in the United States.

Rice milling yield is the amount of polished white rice obtained from husked rough rice (yields of brown rice are higher). Rice milling rates for polished white rice vary by crop variety and quality, but tend to average about 72% of rough rice weight in the United States. Byproducts from rice milling include rice hulls (about 20% of rough rice weight), broken rice. and, for white rice, rice bran, polish, and rice germ (about 8%).

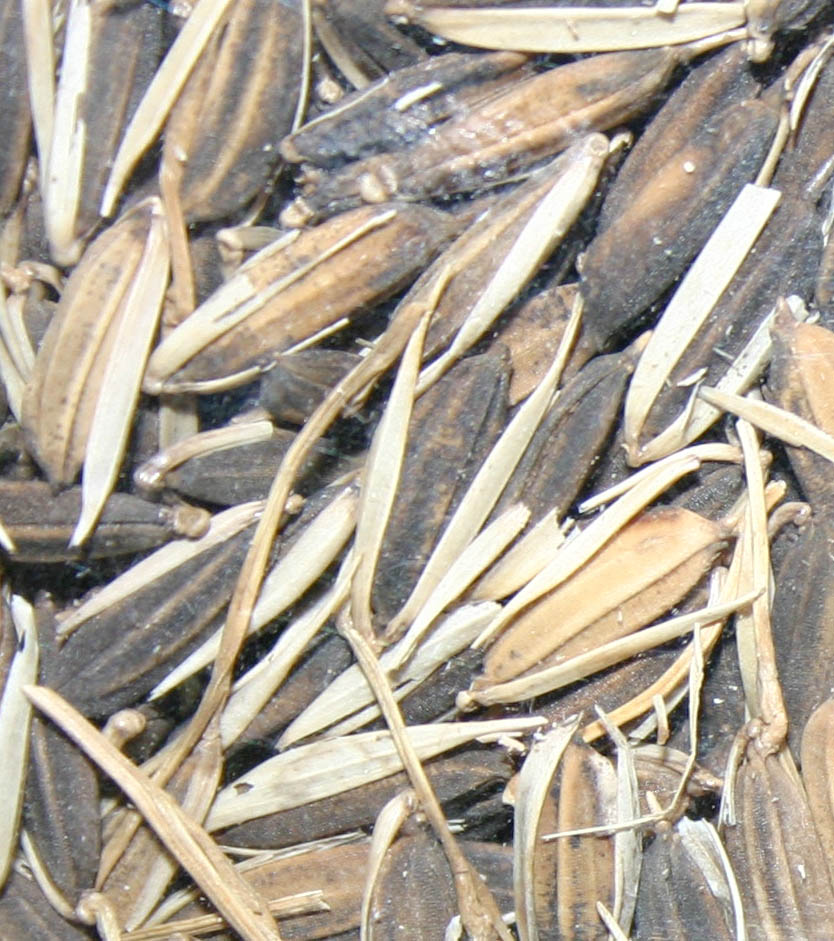
African rice in its inedible husk

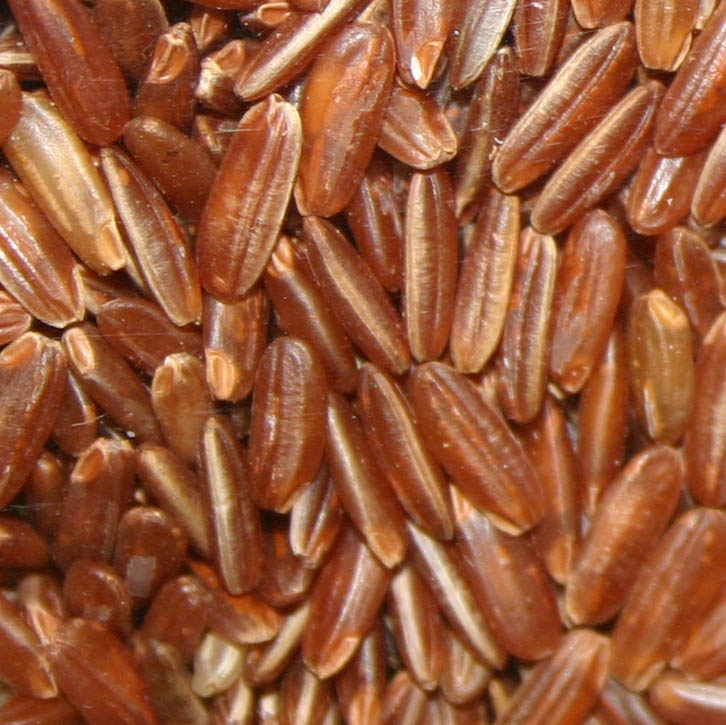
The same rice, dehusked (whole brown rice)

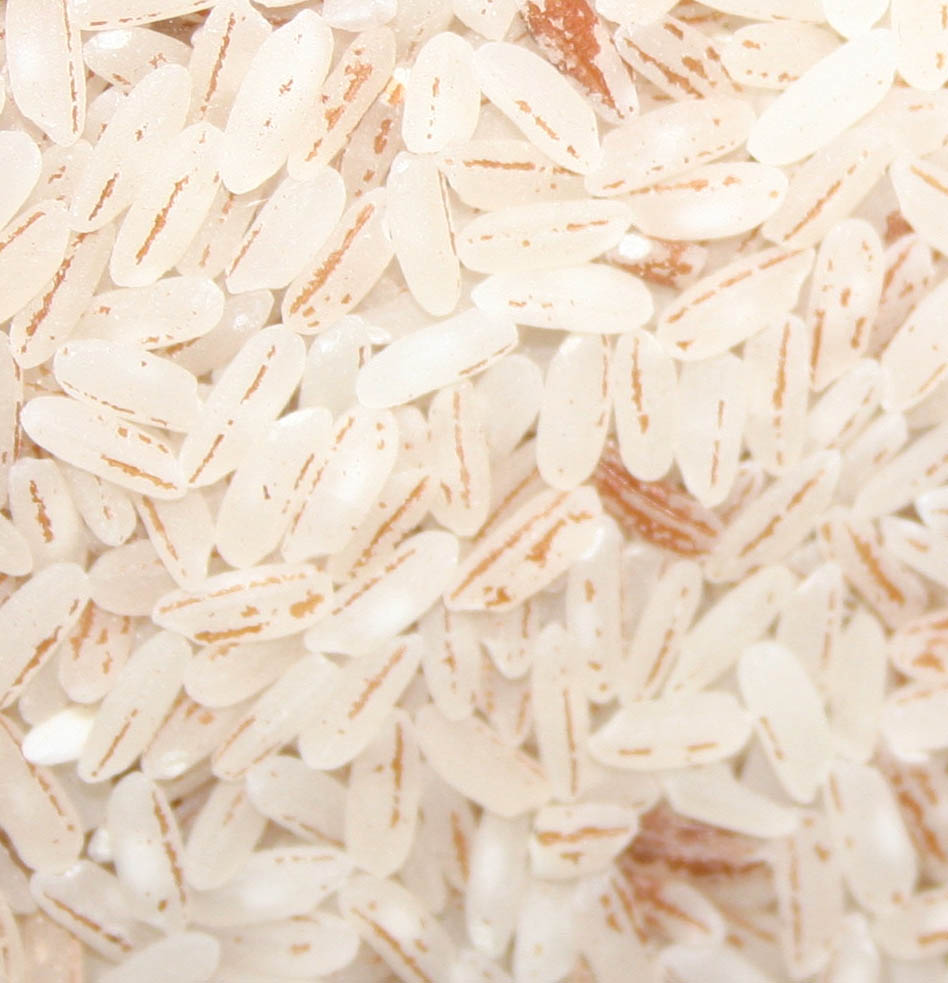
The same rice, with almost all the bran and germ removed to make white rice
