= Sorby Research Institute =

Nutrition research facility in the UK

Coordinates: 53.373020°N 1.504271°W

The Sorby Research Institute was a research facility that operated in the UK during and immediately after the Second World War in Sheffield, England. The Institute mostly investigated questions of nutrition. This was an important consideration in wartime Britain, where food was in short supply. The experiments into deficiency of vitamin A and vitamin C were particularly notable. However, other kinds of medical research was also undertaken, such as research into the transmission of scabies.

The leading figures in the institute were Kenneth Mellanby and Hans Adolf Krebs. The volunteers were mainly conscientious objectors to military service. Some of the experiments were unpleasant, or even dangerous. The Institute closed in 1946, soon after the end of the war.

== History ==
Early in 1941 twelve volunteers, pacifist conscientious objectors, recruited via the Sheffield Pacifist Service Unit, were established in a large house in a residential area of Sheffield for research that would "benefit humanity". Various medical experiments were conducted on the volunteers. No work that had a direct military application was undertaken since this would not have been acceptable to many conscientious objectors. This establishment became known as the Sorby Research Institute, so named because the leading researcher, Kenneth Mellanby, was a Sorby Research Fellow of the Royal Society at Sheffield University. The fellowship is itself named after Henry Clifton Sorby, a notable Sheffield scientist. Hans Adolf Krebs took over the management of the volunteers in 1943 when Mellanby left to work for the army.

The establishment was founded on the personal initiative of Mellanby and at first he was free to carry out whatever investigations he chose. Mellanby's status as a scientist meant that he was in a reserved occupation and forbidden from joining the armed forces. Although he wished to do something for the war effort, the military of the time had no use for biologists. Consequently, Mellanby initiated what he considered useful work himself.

The first experiment was an investigation into scabies. Mellanby had an interest in head lice infestation and scabies was thus a natural area of research for him. Another early experiment looked into water deprivation of survivors in lifeboats. However, the most important work of the Institute was into nutrition, particularly vitamin deficiency. In a period of severe rationing in Britain, it was important for the government to know how far this could be taken and what the consequences would be. This work was commissioned by the Medical Research Council at the request of the Ministry of Health.

The work of the Sorby Research Institute continued until early 1946. The building is now used as residential accommodation for students from Sheffield University.

== Volunteers ==
There were initially 12 volunteers at the house. This eventually grew to 35, including three women. Walter Bartley acted as technician and assistant to Mellanby and later became a professor at Sheffield University, but he also served as a volunteer experiment subject. All the volunteers were young; the 19 men and one woman in the vitamin C experiment were aged between 17 and 34. Some volunteers had regular jobs outside the programme, the rest were expected to carry out domestic tasks in the house. They were also given duties to perform for the experimenters such as collecting data.

Mellanby chose to use conscientious objectors because they were the only group of healthy young people who were not likely to be taken away from him for some military purpose in the middle of an experiment. For their part, the conscientious objectors wished to take part so that they could do something with an equivalent risk to military service.

It is unlikely that many of these experiments would be allowed to be repeated under modern ethical guidelines. Some were dangerous for the volunteers. However, according to John Pemberton, who worked at the Institute, nobody was permanently harmed in any experiment. In 2006 Pemberton attempted to trace the surviving volunteers to solicit their views on the work. Only four still living could be found and all said they thought the work was "worthwhile" and that they would have "volunteered again" if asked.

== Research ==
=== Vitamin deficiency ===
A few experiments performed on vitamin deficiency, such as one conducted to determine the effects of Vitamin A deficiency and to optimize its treatment. In that study, 23 men and women volunteered to live on a diet deficient in vitamin A. However, this experiment lasted considerably longer than expected, from July 1942 to October 1944, and the only specific effect that developed in those deprived of vitamin A was some loss of night vision after about eight months.

A similar experiment was conducted on vitamin C. It lasted from October 1944 to February 1946. Wounds were created on the subjects to study the influence of the vitamin. Ten of the twenty subjects were completely restricted from vitamin C. The wounds of those subjects became hemorrhagic, but the study found that a daily dose of ten milligrams was sufficient to prevent or reverse scurvy in several cases.

The vitamin C research led to the issue of free orange juice for children. The Medical Research Council established recommended daily intakes of vitamins A and C on the basis of the institute's research.

=== Scabies ===
Scabies is a skin disease caused by the burrowing of the mite Sarcoptes scabiei. It leads to what sufferers have described as an "almost intolerable" itching. The experiment was carried out in 1941 and its purpose was to investigate the mode of transmission and possible treatments. The researchers had some difficulty in reliably causing an infection in the volunteers. One technique that was found to be effective was to require the volunteer to wear the used, unwashed underwear of a scabies victim.

Mellanby subsequently used the results of this research in the treatment and observation of military personnel, amongst whom the disease was rife and for which there was previously no effective treatment. He set up a military hospital for this purpose and sent army medical officers to the institute for training.

=== Water deprivation ===
The purpose of this experiment, conducted in 1942, was to investigate the minimum requirement for water. Large amounts of shipping were being sunk in the Battle of the Atlantic by German forces and many surviving sailors spent long periods in lifeboats before being rescued. For this reason, it was known as the shipwreck experiment. A key question was how long they could be expected to survive on only the rations available in lifeboats. The volunteers in this study were deprived of fluids for three and a half days and only allowed to eat the kind of dried food stored as emergency supplies in lifeboats such as sea biscuits and chocolate.

Of all the experiments conducted at the institute, the water deprivation experiment was the one most disliked by the volunteers.

=== Wheat extraction ===
Wheat extraction rate is the amount of grist that becomes flour in a flour mill (the milling yield). A high extraction rate results in brown flour and brown bread. 100% extraction is called wholemeal flour, 70% extraction results in white bread and flour. This was an issue for wartime Britain because wheat imports were essential to her survival and the higher the extraction rate, the less grain would need to be imported. Less grain meant that fewer ships would be needed to transport it, and ships were being sunk at a prodigious rate by German U-boats.

The institute was charged in 1942 with looking into the nutritional value of high extraction wheat. As a result of this research a "national wheatmeal loaf" of 85% extraction was introduced. It was priced the same as the staple white bread to encourage the public to use it (in this period brown bread was normally considered a speciality bread and was more expensive). The research was particularly looking at the issues of digestibility and calcium absorption.

There was some objection from nutritionists to this change. It was known that a high extraction, high fibre, diet leads to poor uptake of vitamin D, and hence can lead to rickets. However, the cost in ships and lives was of greater importance during the war than dietary considerations, so long as the effects were not immediately debilitating. The results of the wheat extraction research made a large difference to Britain's war effort. It has been calculated that raising the extraction rate from 75% to 85% saved the equivalent of forty Liberty ships.

=== Other experiments ===
One experiment required that blood circulation to limbs was cut off with elastic bands. Others included infection with malaria and investigations into surgical shock.

== Bibliography ==
- "Vitamin C tests on 'human guinea pigs'", The Glasgow Herald, p. 8, 22 December 1953. Retrieved 3 December 2014.
- "Sorby Research Institute Collection", The University Library, University of Sheffield. Retrieved 3 December 2014.
- Collins, Alice, "Commentary: Guinea-pigs' private war", International Journal of Epidemiology, vol. 35, iss. 3, pp. 558–560, 2006 doi:10.1093/ije/dyl031. Reprinted from Sheffield Telegraph, p. 12, 29 August 2003.
- Dixon, Bernard, Review: Those who volunteer..., New Scientist, p. 208, 18 October 1973.
- Edgerton, David, Britain's War Machine: Weapons, Resources, and Experts in the Second World War, Oxford University Press, 2011 ISBN 9780199832675.
- Marx, Stephen J.; Liberman, Uri A;, Eil, Charles, "Calciferols: actions and deficiencies in action", Vitamins and Hormones, vol. 40, pp. 235–308, 1983.
- Melicharova, Margaret, "The interest of science", Peace Matters, iss. 52, pp. 7–10, Autumn, 2006.
- Mellanby, Kenneth, Human Guinea Pigs, 2nd (expanded) edition, Merlin Press, 1973 (first edition, Gollancz, 1945), OCLC 1302618
- Pemberton, John, "Medical experiments carried out in Sheffield on conscientious objectors to military service during the 1939–45 war", International Journal of Epidemiology, vol. 35, iss. 3, pp. 556–558, 2006 doi:10.1093/ije/dyl020.
