= Sorbey, Moselle =

Sorbey
- Commune
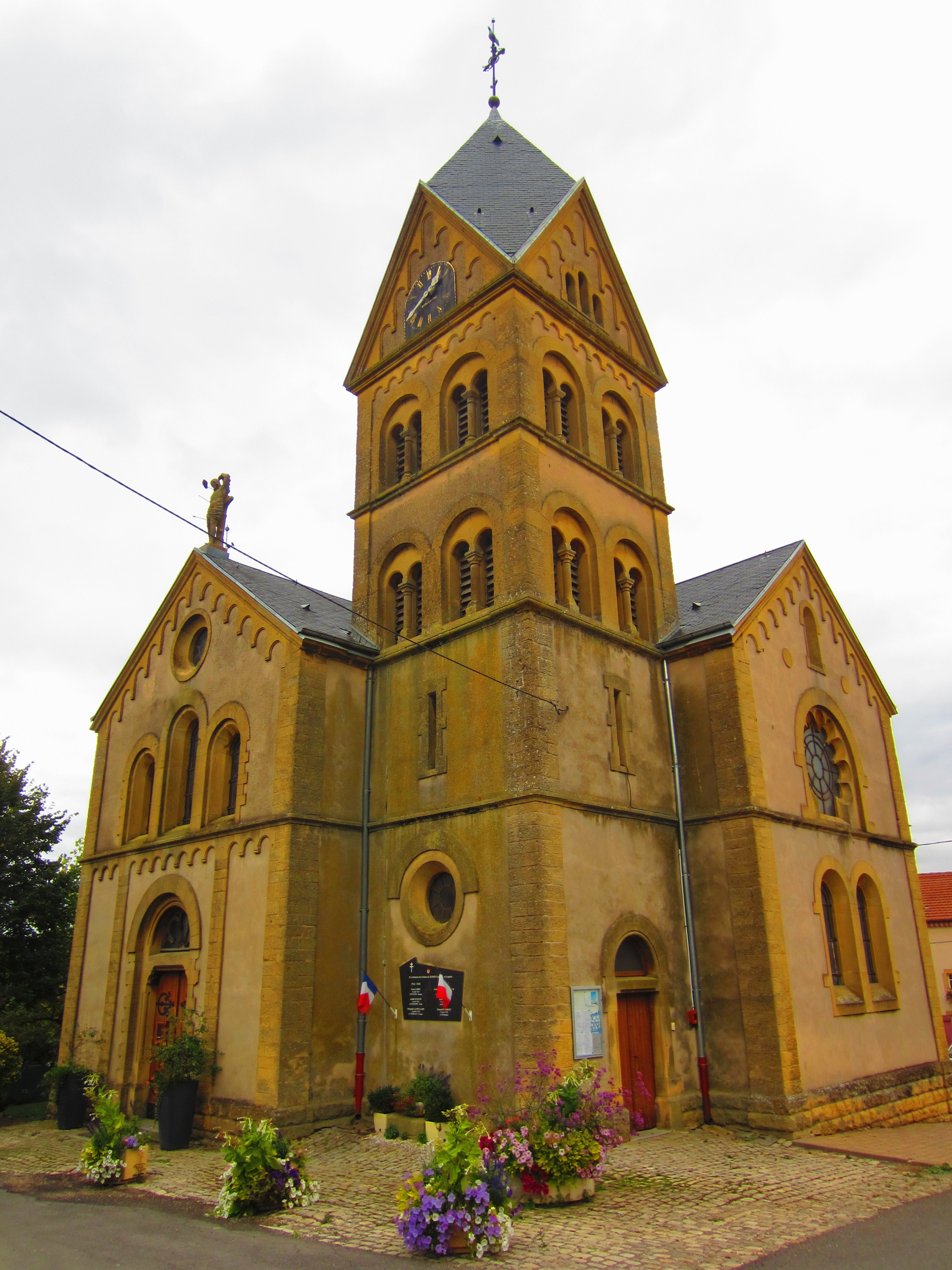
- The church in Sorbey

- Coat of arms
- Location of Sorbey
- Location within France Location within Grand Est
- Coordinates: 49°02′42″N 6°19′03″E
- Country: France
- Region: Grand Est
- Department: Moselle
- Arrondissement: Metz
- Canton: Le Pays Messin
- Intercommunality: Haut Chemin - Pays de Pange

Government
  - Mayor (2020–2026): Claude Spinelli
- Area^{1}: 5.59 km^{2} (2.16 sq mi)
- Elevation: 230 m (750 ft)
- Highest elevation: 280 m (920 ft)
- Lowest elevation: 215 m (705 ft)
- Population (2023): 387
  - Density: 69.2/km^{2} (179/sq mi)
- Time zone: UTC+01:00 (CET)
  - Summer (DST): UTC+02:00 (CEST)
- INSEE/Postal code: 57656 /57580
- ^{1} French Land Register data, which excludes lakes, ponds, glaciers > 1 km^{2} (0.386 sq mi or 247 acres) and river estuaries.

Sorbey (French pronunciation: [sɔʁbɛ]; German: Sorbach; lorrain Sorbeu) is a commune in the Moselle department in Grand Est in north-eastern France.

== See also ==
- Communes of the Moselle department
