= Sorbey, Meuse =

Sorbey
- Commune
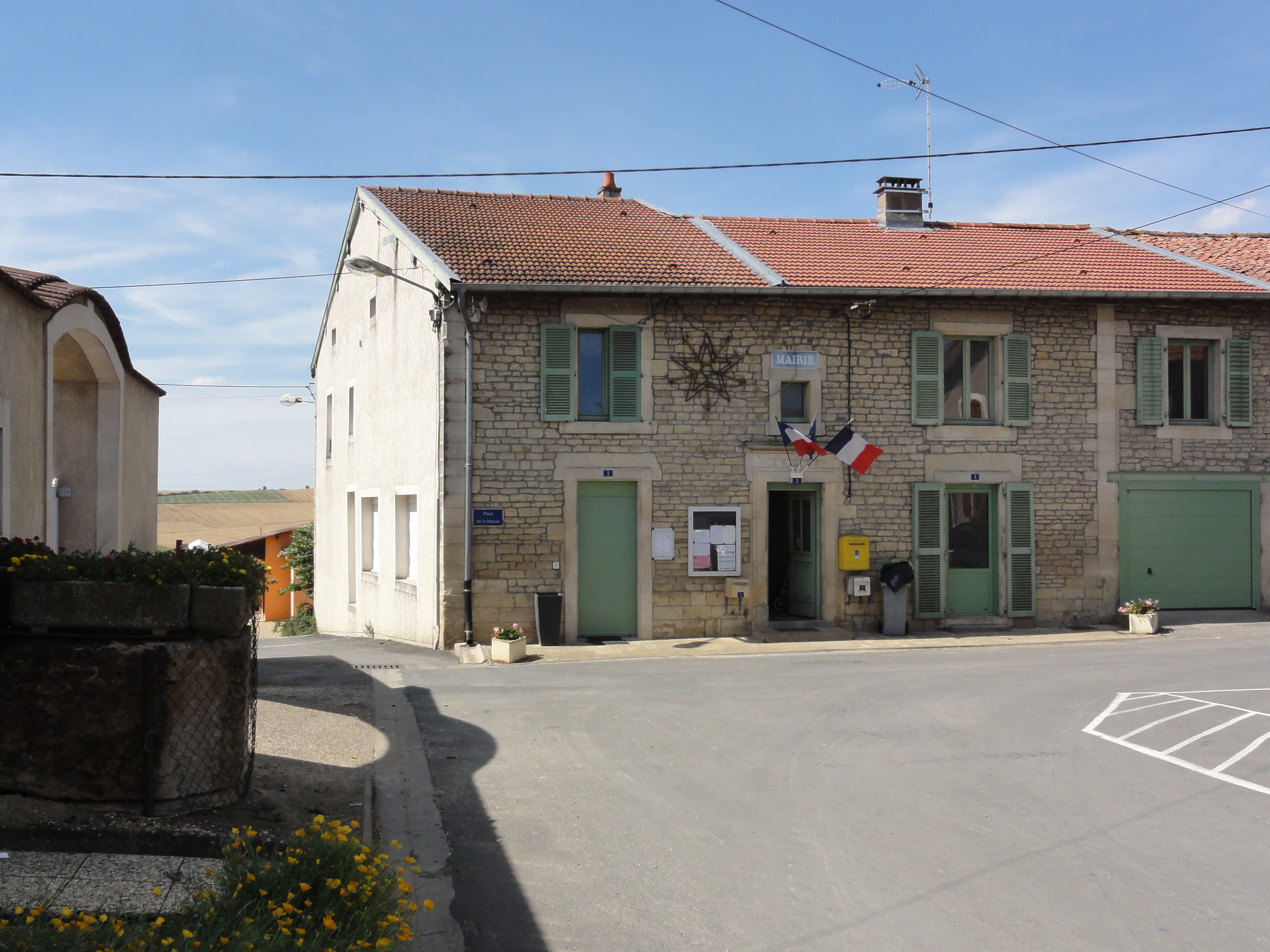
- The town hall in Sorbey

- Coat of arms
- Location of Sorbey
- Location within France Location within Grand Est
- Coordinates: 49°23′50″N 5°34′43″E
- Country: France
- Region: Grand Est
- Department: Meuse
- Arrondissement: Verdun
- Canton: Bouligny
- Intercommunality: CC Damvillers Spincourt

Government
  - Mayor (2020–2026): Julien Michels
- Area^{1}: 12.42 km^{2} (4.80 sq mi)
- Elevation: 230 m (750 ft)
- Highest elevation: 322 m (1,056 ft)
- Lowest elevation: 213 m (699 ft)
- Population (2023): 227
  - Density: 18.3/km^{2} (47.3/sq mi)
- Time zone: UTC+01:00 (CET)
  - Summer (DST): UTC+02:00 (CEST)
- INSEE/Postal code: 55495 /55230
- ^{1} French Land Register data, which excludes lakes, ponds, glaciers > 1 km^{2} (0.386 sq mi or 247 acres) and river estuaries.

Sorbey (French pronunciation: [sɔʁbɛ]) is a commune in the Meuse department in Grand Est in north-eastern France.

== Geography ==
The village lies on the right bank of the Othain, which forms most of the commune's southern border.

== See also ==
- Communes of the Meuse department
