= Mangiennes =

- Commune
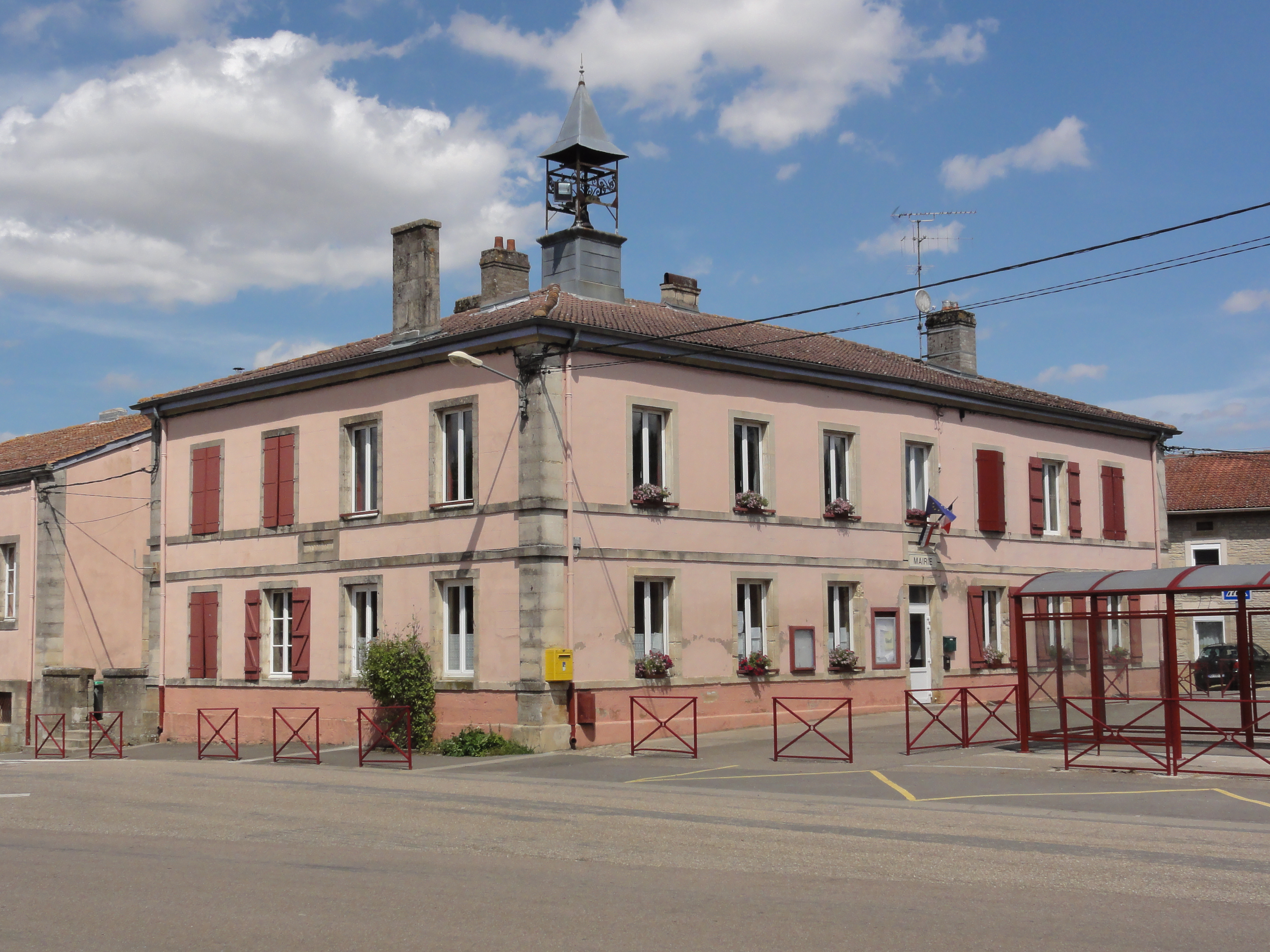
- The town hall in Mangiennes

- Coat of arms
- Location of Mangiennes
- Location within France Location within Grand Est
- Coordinates: 49°21′28″N 5°31′37″E
- Country: France
- Region: Grand Est
- Department: Meuse
- Arrondissement: Verdun
- Canton: Bouligny
- Intercommunality: CC Damvillers Spincourt

Government
  - Mayor (2020–2026): Alain Simon
- Area^{1}: 18.32 km^{2} (7.07 sq mi)
- Elevation: 210 m (690 ft)
- Population (2023): 397
  - Density: 21.7/km^{2} (56.1/sq mi)
- Time zone: UTC+01:00 (CET)
  - Summer (DST): UTC+02:00 (CEST)
- INSEE/Postal code: 55316 /55150
- ^{1} French Land Register data, which excludes lakes, ponds, glaciers > 1 km^{2} (0.386 sq mi or 247 acres) and river estuaries.

Mangiennes (French pronunciation: [mɑ̃ʒjɛn]) is a commune in the Meuse department in Grand Est in north-eastern France.

== See also ==
- Communes of the Meuse department
