= Antoine-François, marquis de Lambertye =

French aristocrat (1708–1777)

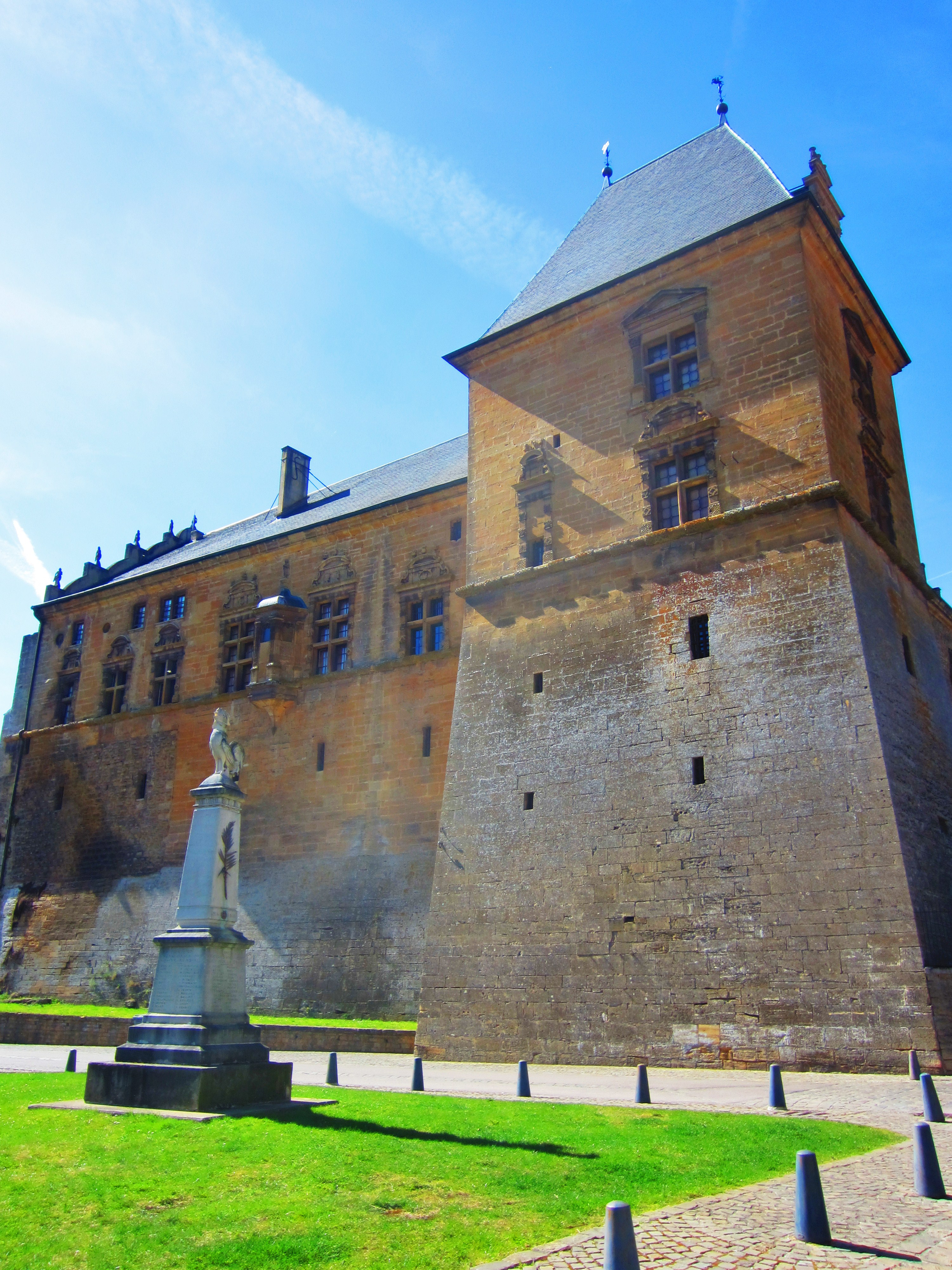
Château de Cons-la-Grandville

Charles-François-Antoine, marquis de Lambertie (22 October 1708, Lunéville – 9 February 1777, Cons-la-Grandville) was a French aristocrat of the Ancien régime.

== Career ==
Lambertie served as an officer in the Royal Regiment of Guards becoming Lieutenant-Colonel, as well as serving King Louis XV as a diplomatic envoy to London.

He was appointed a Knight of the Order of the Holy Spirit and of the Sovereign Military Order of Malta.

In 1760, he wrote a book on his travels in the Caribbean : Histoire des Caraïbes: Nation Sauvage qui habite les Isles du Vent en Amérique et partie de la Terre ferme ou continent.

== Family ==
He succeeded his father, who had been created a Marquis in 1719 (Nicolas-François, a Lieutenant-General of the French Army) in the family titles, including Count de Cons-la-Grandville, Baron de Bioncourt, Seigneur de Chenières, de Villers-la-Chèvre, de Cônes, Flaubeville, de Cutry, du Grand et Petit-Failly, etc.

The Marquis of Lambertie married three times:

- 1. (1736) Marie-Anne-Françoise-Xavière de Custine (died 1739, in childbirth), daughter and sole heiress of Charles-Ferdinand, comte de Wiltz.
- 2. (1758) Dame Antoinette de Vaux.
- 3. (1771) Marie-Françoise Louvain de Fontaines.

His nephew was Camille Joseph Graf Lambertie, a confidant of Francis II, Holy Roman Emperor.

== See also ==
- List of Ambassadors of France to the United Kingdom
