= Gondrecourt =

Gondrecourt may refer to the following communes in France:

- Gondrecourt-Aix, Meurthe-et-Moselle department, north-eastern France
- Gondrecourt-le-Château, Meuse department, Lorraine, north-eastern France

== See also ==
- Gondecourt, a commune in the Nord department, northern France
