= Félix Deschange =

French politician (1832–1916)

Eugène Félix Deschange or Deschanges (9 August 1832, in Rouvrois-sur-Othain – October 18, 1916) was a French republican politician. He was a member of the National Assembly from 1871 to 1876. He belonged to the Opportunist Republican parliamentary group, Gauche républicaine.
