= João Costa =

João Costa may refer to:

== Places ==
- João Costa, Piauí, Brazil

== People ==
- João da Costa (1610–1664), Portuguese noble, Count of Soure, and one of the Forty Conspirators
- João Cruz Costa (1904–1978), a Brazilian philosopher
- João Resende Costa (1910–2007), Brazilian Roman Catholic bishop
- João Costa (fencer) (1920–2010), Portuguese fencer
- João Costa (sport shooter) (born 1964), Portuguese sports shooter
- João Costa (politician) (born 1972), Portuguese politician
- João Costa (footballer, born 1996), Portuguese football goalkeeper
- João Costa (footballer, born 2000), Portuguese football striker for Santa Clara
- João Costa (footballer, born 1 March 2005), Brazilian football midfielder for Botafogo-SP
- João Costa (footballer, born 28 March 2005), Portuguese football winger for Al-Ettifaq
