= Bazeilles-sur-Othain =

- Commune
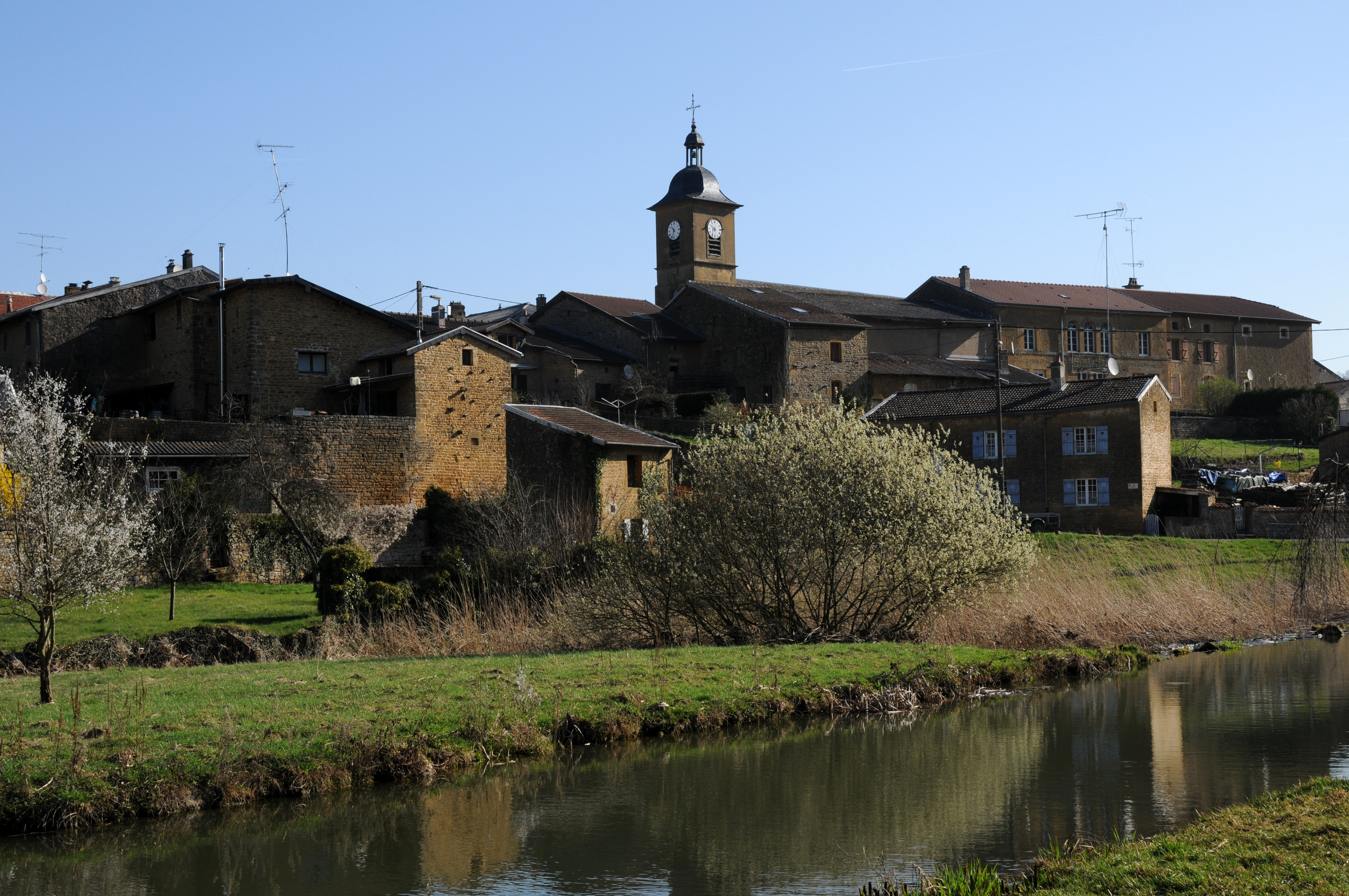
- A general view of Bazeilles-sur-Othain

- Coat of arms
- Location of Bazeilles-sur-Othain
- Location within France Location within Grand Est
- Coordinates: 49°29′51″N 5°25′44″E
- Country: France
- Region: Grand Est
- Department: Meuse
- Arrondissement: Verdun
- Canton: Montmédy
- Intercommunality: Pays de Montmédy

Government
  - Mayor (2020–2026): Fabienne Thomas
- Area^{1}: 7.66 km^{2} (2.96 sq mi)
- Elevation: 240 m (790 ft)
- Highest elevation: 337 m (1,106 ft)
- Lowest elevation: 187 m (614 ft)
- Population (2023): 107
  - Density: 14.0/km^{2} (36.2/sq mi)
- Time zone: UTC+01:00 (CET)
  - Summer (DST): UTC+02:00 (CEST)
- INSEE/Postal code: 55034 /55600
- ^{1} French Land Register data, which excludes lakes, ponds, glaciers > 1 km^{2} (0.386 sq mi or 247 acres) and river estuaries.

Bazeilles-sur-Othain (French pronunciation: [bazɛj syʁ ɔtɛ̃], lit. 'Bazeilles on Othain') is a commune in the Meuse department in the Grand Est region in northeastern France.

== Geography ==
The river Othain flows west through the southern part of the commune and crosses the village. The Chiers forms all of the commune's northern border.

== Population ==
Historical population
Year	Pop.	±% p.a.
1968	118	—
1975	109	−1.13%
1982	96	−1.80%
1990	72	−3.53%
1999	91	+2.64%
2007	96	+0.67%
2012	120	+4.56%
2017	116	−0.68%
2023	107	−1.34%
Source: INSEE

== See also ==
- Communes of the Meuse department
