= Gondrecourt-le-Château =

- Commune
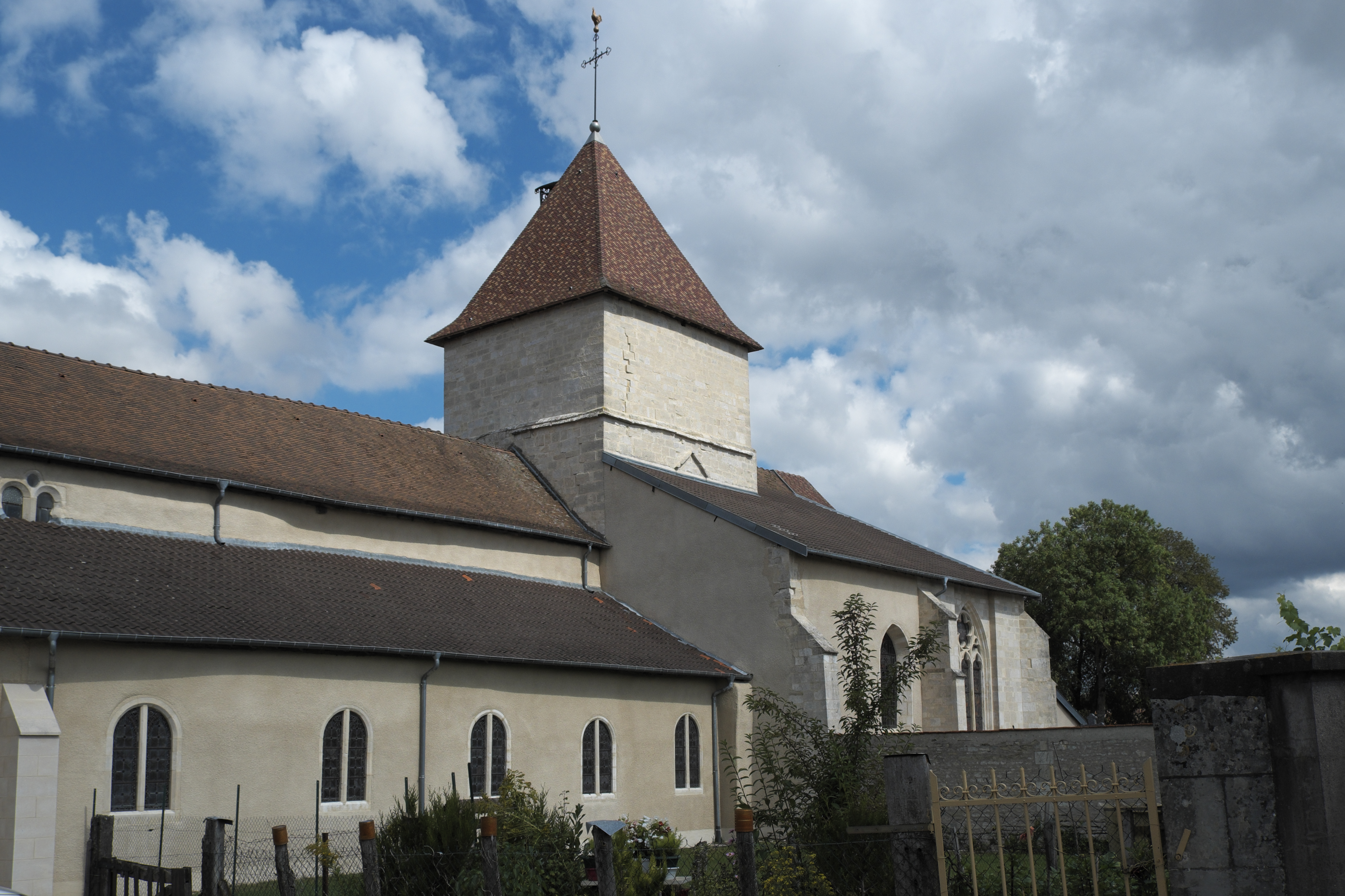
- The church in Gondrecourt-le-Château

- Coat of arms
- Location of Gondrecourt-le-Château
- Location within France Location within Grand Est
- Coordinates: 48°30′51″N 5°30′28″E
- Country: France
- Region: Grand Est
- Department: Meuse
- Arrondissement: Commercy
- Canton: Ligny-en-Barrois
- Intercommunality: Portes de Meuse

Government
  - Mayor (2020–2026): Daniel Renaudeau
- Area^{1}: 51.33 km^{2} (19.82 sq mi)
- Elevation: 280 m (920 ft)
- Highest elevation: 428 m (1,404 ft)
- Lowest elevation: 287 m (942 ft)
- Population (2023): 1,032
  - Density: 20.11/km^{2} (52.07/sq mi)
- Time zone: UTC+01:00 (CET)
  - Summer (DST): UTC+02:00 (CEST)
- INSEE/Postal code: 55215 /55130
- ^{1} French Land Register data, which excludes lakes, ponds, glaciers > 1 km^{2} (0.386 sq mi or 247 acres) and river estuaries.

Gondrecourt-le-Château (French pronunciation: [ɡɔ̃dʁəkuʁ lə ʃɑto]) is a commune in the Meuse department in Grand Est in north-eastern France.

On 1 January 1973 (prefectoral order dated 1 December 1972), the communes of Luméville-en-Ornois and Touraille-sous-Bois merged with and became part of it.

== Notable people ==
- Louis Jacquinot, former Minister of the Marine (Navy) in 1944
- Fernand Braudel, historian born in Luméville-en-Ornois 1902
- Fernand Fleuret, writer and poet, born in Gondrecout April 1883
- André Droitcourt, former Deputy of the Meuse from 1993 to 1997

== See also ==
- Communes of the Meuse department

(Gondrecourt-le-Château)
