= Flassigny =

- Commune
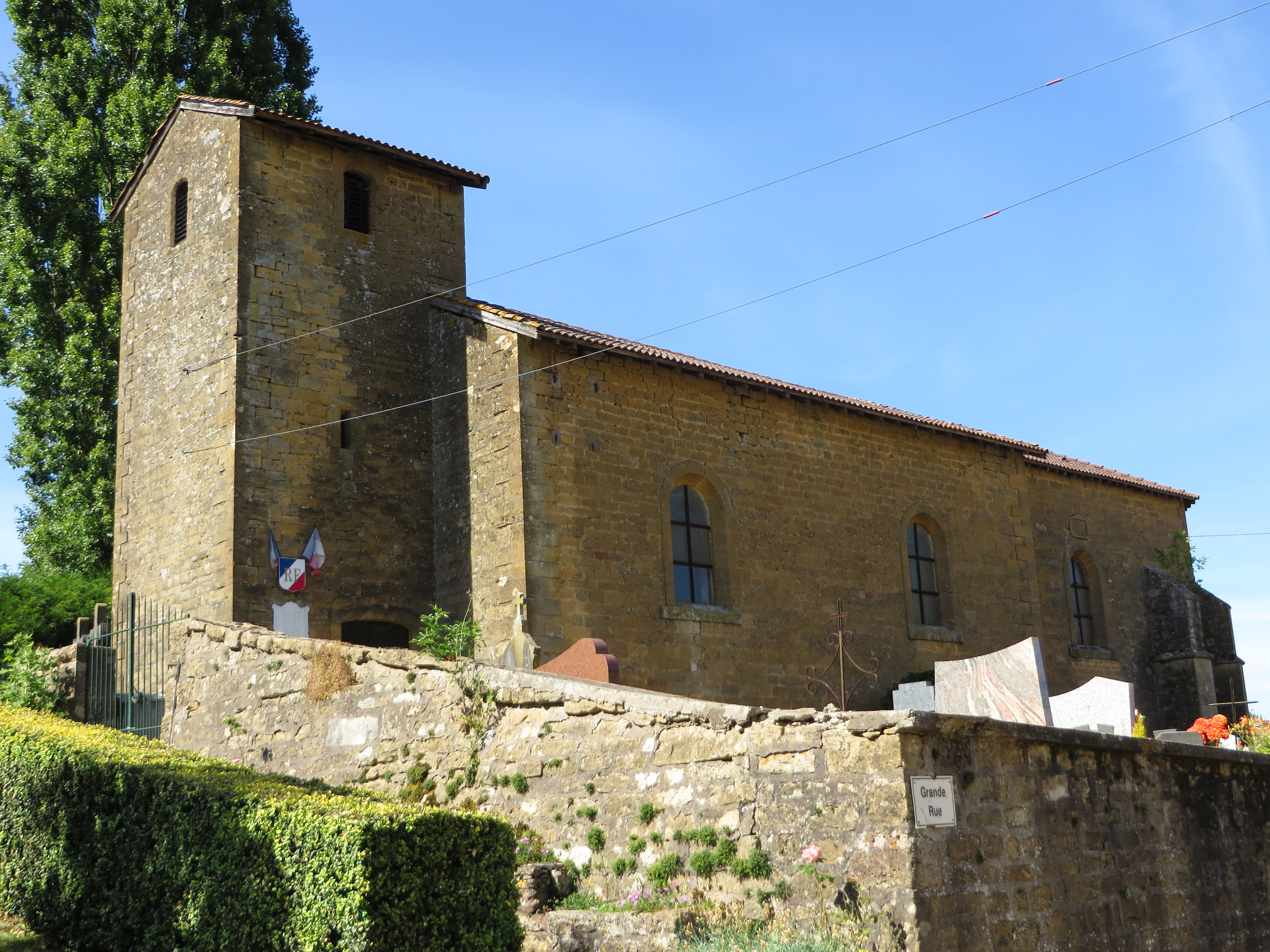
- The church in Flassigny
- Location of Flassigny
- Location within France Location within Grand Est
- Coordinates: 49°28′27″N 5°26′30″E
- Country: France
- Region: Grand Est
- Department: Meuse
- Arrondissement: Verdun
- Canton: Montmédy
- Intercommunality: Pays de Montmédy

Government
  - Mayor (2020–2026): Pierre Guillaume
- Area^{1}: 6.66 km^{2} (2.57 sq mi)
- Elevation: 252 m (827 ft)
- Highest elevation: 337 m (1,106 ft)
- Lowest elevation: 193 m (633 ft)
- Population (2023): 43
  - Density: 6.5/km^{2} (17/sq mi)
- Time zone: UTC+01:00 (CET)
  - Summer (DST): UTC+02:00 (CEST)
- INSEE/Postal code: 55188 /55600
- ^{1} French Land Register data, which excludes lakes, ponds, glaciers > 1 km^{2} (0.386 sq mi or 247 acres) and river estuaries.

Flassigny (French pronunciation: [flasiɲi]) is a commune in the Meuse department in Grand Est in north-eastern France.

== Geography ==
The river Othain forms all of the commune's eastern border; a Roman road forms most of its southern border.

== See also ==
- Communes of the Meuse department
