= Fernand Braudel =

French historian of the Annales School (1902–1985)

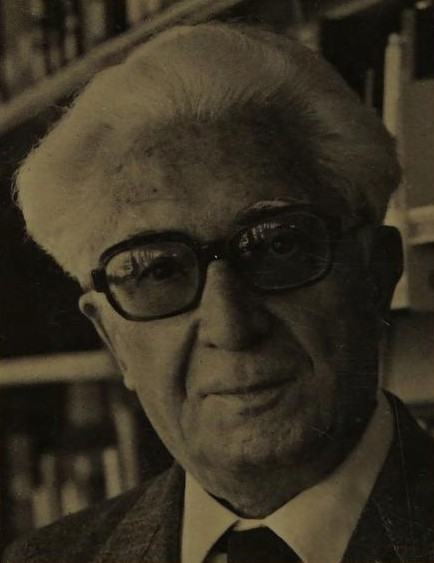
- Born: Fernand Paul Achille Braudel; 24 August 1902; Luméville-en-Ornois, France
- Died: 27 November 1985 (aged 83); Cluses, France
- Occupation: Historian
- Spouses: Paulette Valier (m. 1927; div. 1933); Paule Braudel (m. 1933)
- Children: 2

Academic background
- Education: University of Paris
- Thesis: La Méditerranée et le Monde méditerranéen à l'époque de Philippe II (1947)
- Doctoral advisor: Georges Pagès, Roger Dion

Academic work
- Institutions: University of Algiers (1924–1932), Lycée Pasteur (Neuilly-sur-Seine), Lycée Condorcet and Lycée Henri-IV (1932–1935), University of São Paulo (1935–1937), École pratique des hautes études (1937–1939, 1945–1968)
- Notable students: François Furet

Fernand Paul Achille Braudel (French: [fɛʁnɑ̃ bʁodɛl]; 24 August 1902 – 27 November 1985) was a French historian. His scholarship focused on three main projects: The Mediterranean (1923–49, then 1949–66), Civilization and Capitalism (1955–79), and the unfinished Identity of France (1970–85). He was a member of the Annales School of French historiography and social history in the 1950s and 1960s.

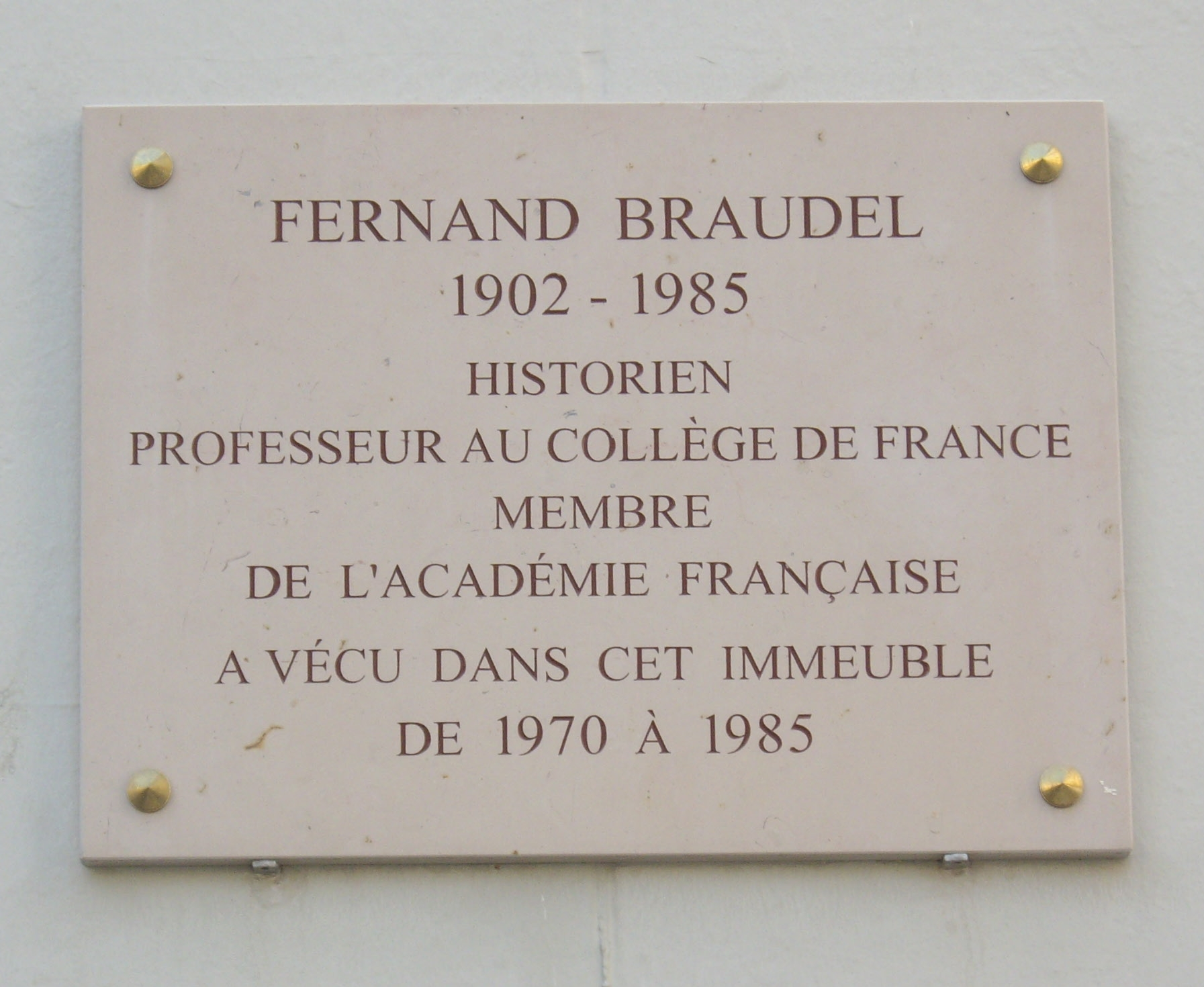
Plaque Fernand Braudel, 59 rue Brillat-Savarin, Paris 13

Braudel emphasized the role of large-scale socioeconomic factors in the making and writing of history. In a 2011 poll by History Today magazine, he was named the most important historian of the previous 60 years.

== Education ==
Braudel was born in Luméville-en-Ornois in the département of the Meuse, France. He grew up in a pre-industrial rural setting with his grandmother until at the age of seven he joined his father in Paris. His father, a mathematics teacher, aided him in his studies. His maternal grandfather had been a Communard, and Braudel was reluctant to mention this side of his family.

Braudel was educated at the Lycée Voltaire (1913-1920), where he studied Latin and Greek, and at the Sorbonne, where he was taught by Henri Hauser and gained an agrégation in history in 1923. He taught at a lycée in Constantine in French Algeria in 1923/24, where he met his future second wife, Paule Pradel, and then at the University of Algiers until 1932, with a break for military service in the French Army of the Rhine in 1925/26.

While in Algeria, he became fascinated by the Mediterranean Sea and wrote a paper on the Spanish presence in the country during the 16th century. He also began there his doctoral thesis on the foreign policy of King Philip II of Spain (r. 1556–1598), with archival research at the General Archive of Simancas in the summer of 1927. He visited several archives around the Mediterranean, including at Venice, Valencia and finally Dubrovnik in 1936/37, and microfilmed documents with the help of his wife. From 1932 to 1935 he taught in the Paris lycées (secondary schools) of Pasteur, Condorcet and Henri-IV. During this period he first met Lucien Febvre, the co-founder of the Annales journal (1929).

By 1900, the French had solidified their cultural influence in Brazil by the establishment of the Brazilian Academy of Fine Arts. São Paulo still lacked a university, however, and in 1934, the francophile Julio de Mesquita Filho invited the anthropologist Claude Lévi-Strauss and Braudel to help develop one. The result was the establishment of the new University of São Paulo on 25 January 1934. Braudel left for Brazil in March 1935, after the birth of his daughter, and took up the post vacated by Émile Coornaert. He worked within the state-promoted ideological framework of Pan-Latinism, part of the French civilizing mission, and helped the São Paulo elites in their project of achieving social and national hegemony. His colleagues included João Cruz Costa, Roberto Simonsen and Caio Prado Júnior. The evening lectures of French professors were attended by the city governor Armando de Sales Oliveira and Marshal Cândido Rondon.

Braudel made use of his stay for intellectual experimentation and he later said that the time in Brazil had been the "greatest period of his life". Braudel was fascinated with São Paulo's rapid vertical growth in the early Vargas Era (Note: Merkel draws a comparison between the French attitudes to Brazilian modernism and the German attitudes to the United States as reflected in Fritz Lang's Metropolis.) and noted the Paulista academics' claims that "there is no social question" in the new world. Unlike Lévi-Strauss, he did not actively support the Communist-backed National Liberation Alliance, but took a more centrist position. He compared Brazil favourably – on account of its "social malleability" and tabula rasa development as a "young European civilization" – to Algeria and even to the United States in his 1937 The Concept of a New Country. He would later call Algeria, with its "uneducable" population, "a failed Brazil".

== Career ==
In 1937, Braudel returned to Paris from Brazil. He spent the twenty-day sea journey in the company of Febvre and his family as both had booked passage on the same ship. Braudel thus fell under the influence of the Annales School. In 1938 he entered the École pratique des hautes études as an instructor in history. He worked with Febvre, who would later read the early versions of Braudel's magnum opus and provide him with editorial advice. He started writing his book on Philip II's Mediterranean at Febvre's house in the Juras. He only took a stance on current politics when expressing condemnation of the Munich Agreement in 1938.

At the outbreak of war in 1939, he was called up for military service and on 29 June 1940 taken prisoner as lieutenant in the 156th Infantry Regiment by the Germans in the Vosges. He was initially held at a prisoner-of-war camp in Neuf-Brisach and then in the Oflag XII-B in the citadel of Mainz. In Mainz, he became the rector of the camp university, which gained him respectful treatment (per Magnifizenz) from the camp authorities and the right to borrow books and journals from the well-provisioned municipal library for his research. Under the Geneva Convention he received his pay, which he used to buy German books (e.g. the works of Werner Sombart and Max Weber), and was able to order material from France, including the full collection of the Annales.

In June 1942, suspected of "Gaullist" (i.e. French Resistance) involvement, he was transferred to a camp for special category prisoners (Oflag X-C) near Lübeck, where he remained for the rest of the war. In the camp, he befriended some Catholic clerics and the historian Henri Brunschwig. (Note: According to Schöttler, Brunschwig would express his gratitude in the camp to Philippe Pétain and the Wehrmacht for protecting him from the Holocaust.) Braudel drafted his great work La Méditerranée et le monde méditerranéen à l'époque de Philippe II (The Mediterranean and the Mediterranean World in the Age of Philip II) without access to his personal collection of books and notes, which forced him to rely in that regard on his prodigious memory. According to his own account, the long-time perspective he took was in part a "direct existential" reaction to the troubling war news. By "choosing the position of God the Father himself as a refuge" he sought to assert the "perdurability and majestic immobility" of the Mediterranean against the "fleeting occurrence" of political events which he associated with the "daily misery" of the camp. He sent completed copy books to Febvre in Paris, (Note: The wartime correspondence, unpublished due to the refusal by Febvre's heirs to grant permission, reveals their father-son relationship. It also shows that Braudel asked after Marc Bloch in the summer of 1944, when the latter was already dead, to which Febvre replied by emphasising Bloch's bravery.) first apparently through the International Red Cross, and after obtaining written authorisation from the OKW in November 1942 via the German embassy in Paris. He occasionally dispatched books to Febvre as well. He edited his work after his release in 1945 by checking it against the archival material that survived the war in a metal container in the basement of his Paris house. He cut portions from the copy books and re-arranged the text with new insertions, then destroyed the manuscripts – only a fragment gifted to Febvre has survived. During the war, his wife and children lived in Algeria.

Braudel became the leader of the second generation of Annales historians after 1945. He defended his thesis at the University of Paris in 1947. In that year, with Febvre and Charles Morazé, he obtained funding from the French government and the Rockefeller Foundation (which had previously supported the wartime exile École libre des hautes études in New York) to set up the Sixième section for economic and social sciences at the École pratique des hautes études (EPHE), which then became the funnel for all historical research in France. In 1948, the Centre de recherches historiques was established there, with Braudel as its director. In 1949 he was elected by the professors of the Collège de France as one of their number upon Febvre's retirement. He co-founded the academic journal Revue économique, in 1950. He became the head of the Sixième section at EPHE after the death of Febvre in 1956 and attracted scholars such as Roland Barthes and Jacques Lacan to join its activities. He became the editor-in-chief of the Annales in 1957, which completed his rise to unrivalled influence on the development of the historical studies in France in the post-war years. He received an additional $1 million from the Ford Foundation in 1960.

In 1962, he and Gaston Berger used the Ford Foundation grant and government funds to create a new independent foundation, the Fondation Maison des Sciences de l'Homme (FMSH), which Braudel directed from 1970 to his death. It was housed in the building called "Maison des Sciences de l'Homme". FMSH focused its activities on international networking in order to disseminate the Annales approach to the rest of Europe and to the world. In 1972 Braudel gave up all editorial responsibility on the Annales journal, but his name remained on the masthead.

In 1962 Braudel wrote A History of Civilizations as the basis for a history course, but its rejection of the traditional event-based narrative was too radical for the French Ministry of Education, which in turn rejected it.

He retired in 1968. In 1975, the Sixième section was transformed into School for Advanced Studies in the Social Sciences, a public institution of higher education in its own right. In 1984 he was elected to the Académie française and his introduction speech was given by Maurice Druon.

== La Méditerranée ==
His first book, La Méditerranée et le monde méditerranéen à l'époque de Philippe II (1949) (The Mediterranean and the Mediterranean World in the Age of Philip II) was his most influential and has been described as a "watershed".

For Braudel there is no single Mediterranean Sea. There are many seas, indeed a "vast, complex expanse" within which men operate. Life is conducted on the Mediterranean: people travel, fish, fight wars, and drown in its various contexts, and the sea articulates with the plains and islands. Life on the plains is diverse and complex; the poorer south is affected by religious diversity (Catholicism and Islam), as well as by intrusions, both cultural and economic, from the north. In other words, the Mediterranean cannot be understood independently from what is exterior to it. Any rigid adherence to boundaries falsifies the situation.

The first level of time, geographical time, is that of the environment, with its slow, almost imperceptible change, its repetition and cycles. Such change may be slow, but it is irresistible. The second level of time comprises long-term social, economic, and cultural history, where Braudel discusses the Mediterranean economy, social groupings, empires and civilizations. Change at that level is much more rapid than that of the environment. Braudel looks at two or three centuries to spot a particular pattern such as the rise and fall of various aristocracies. The third level of time is that of events (histoire événementielle). This is the history of individuals with names. That, for Braudel, is the time of surfaces and deceptive effects. It is the time of the courte durée proper and the focus of Part 3 of The Mediterranean, which treats of "events, politics and people."

Braudel's Mediterranean is centered on the sea, but just as importantly, it is also the desert and the mountains. The desert creates a nomadic form of social organization where the whole community moves; mountain life is sedentary. Transhumance, the movement from the mountain to the plain or vice versa in a given season, is also a persistent part of Mediterranean existence.

Braudel's vast panoramic view used insights from other social sciences, employed the concept of the longue durée, and downplayed the importance of specific events. It was widely admired, but most historians did not try to replicate it and instead focused on their specialized monographs. The book firmly launched the study of the Mediterranean and dramatically raised the worldwide profile of the Annales School.

In the 1966 second edition to his book, which went further in the direction of seeking scientific precision through economic quantification, Braudel claimed that over the previous twenty to thirty years "the chain of economic events and their short-term conjunctures" had been established as a less obvious alternative to the traditional "chain of political events".

The second edition appeared in 70,000 copies, in contrast to the 2,500 copies of the first edition. It was only with the publishing of the English translation of the second edition of his book that Braudel's work began to make an impact on Anglophone scholarship.

== Capitalism ==
After La Méditerranée, Braudel's most famous work is Civilisation Matérielle, Économie et Capitalisme, XV^{e}-XVIII^{e} ("Civilization and Capitalism, 15th-18th Century"). The first volume was published in 1967 and was translated to English in 1973. The last of the three-volume work appeared in 1979. The work is a broad-scale history of the pre-industrial modern world focusing on how regular people made economies work. Like all of Braudel's other major works, it mixes traditional economic material with thick description of the social impact of economic events on various facets of everyday life, including food, fashion and other social customs.

The third volume, subtitled "The Perspective of the World", was strongly influenced by the work of German scholars like Werner Sombart. In it, Braudel traces the impact of the centers of Western capitalism on the rest of the world. Braudel wrote the series as a way of explanation for the modern way and partly as a refutation of the Marxist view of history.

Braudel discussed the idea of long-term cycles in the capitalist economy that he saw developing in Europe in the 12th century. Particular cities and later nation-states follow each other sequentially as centres of these cycles: Venice in the 13th through the 15th centuries (1250–1510); Antwerp and Genoa in the 16th century (1500–1569 and 1557–1627, respectively), Amsterdam in the 16th through 18th centuries (1627–1733); and London (and England) in the 18th and 19th centuries (1733–1896). He used the word "structures" to denote a variety of social structures, such as organized behaviours, attitudes, and conventions, as well as physical structures and infrastructures. He argued that the structures established in Europe during the Middle Ages contributed to the successes of present-day European-based cultures. He attributed much of that to the long-standing independence of city-states, which, though later subjugated by larger geographic states, were not always completely suppressed, probably for reasons of utility.

Braudel argues that capitalists have typically been monopolists and not, as is usually assumed, entrepreneurs operating in competitive markets. He argued that capitalists did not specialize and did not use free markets, and he thus diverges from both liberal (Adam Smith) and Marxian interpretations. In Braudel's view, the state in capitalist countries has served as a guarantor of monopolists rather than a protector of competition, as it is usually portrayed. He asserted that capitalists have had power and cunning on their side, as they have arrayed themselves against the majority of the population.

An agrarian structure is a long-term structure in the Braudelian understanding of the concept. On a larger scale the agrarian structure is more dependent on the regional, social, cultural and historical factors than on the state's undertaken activities.

== L'Identité de la France ==
Braudel's last and most personal book was L'Identité de la France (The Identity of France), which was unfinished at the time of his death in 1985. Unlike in many of Braudel's other books, he makes no secret of his profound love of his country in this book and remarks at the beginning that he had loved France as if she were a woman. Reflecting his interest with the longue durée, Braudel's concern in L'Identité de la France was with the centuries and millennia, instead of the years and decades. Braudel argued that France is the product not of its politics or economics but rather of its geography and culture, a thesis that Braudel had explored in a wide-ranging book that saw the bourg and the patois: histoire totale integrated into a broad sweep of both the place and the time.

L'Identité de la France was much coloured by a romantic nostalgia, as Braudel argued for the existence of a France profonde, a "deep France" based upon the peasant mentalité, which despite all of the turmoil of French history and the Industrial Revolution, has survived intact right up to the present.

In this book, he expressed a conviction that economics is "the most scientific of the sciences of man", while history is merely an imperfect one.

== Historiography ==
According to Braudel, before the Annales approach, the writing of history was focused on the courte durée (short span), or on histoire événementielle (a history of events).

His followers admired his use of the longue durée approach to stress the slow and often imperceptible effects of space, climate and technology on the actions of human beings in the past. (Note: See Wallerstein, "Time and Duration" (1997)) The Annales historians, after living through two world wars and massive political upheavals in France, were very uncomfortable with the notion that multiple ruptures and discontinuities created history. They preferred to stress inertia and the longue durée, arguing that the continuities in the deepest structures of society were central to history. Upheavals in institutions or the superstructure of social life were of little significance, for history, they argued, lies beyond the reach of conscious actors, especially the will of revolutionaries. They rejected the Marxist idea that history should be used as a tool to foment and foster revolutions. A proponent of historical materialism himself, Braudel rejected Marxist dialectics, stressing the equal importance of infrastructure and superstructure, both of which reflected enduring social, economic, and cultural realities. Braudel's structures, both mental and environmental, determine the long-term course of events by constraining actions on, and by, humans over a duration long enough that they are beyond the consciousness of the actors involved.

A feature of Braudel's work was his compassion for the suffering of marginal people. He articulated the view that most surviving historical sources come from the literate wealthy classes. He emphasised the importance of the ephemeral lives of slaves, serfs, peasants and the urban poor, and demonstrated their contributions to the wealth and power of their respective masters and societies. His work was often illustrated with contemporary depictions of daily life and rarely with pictures of noblemen or kings. He chose to emphasise constraints on human agency – as J. H. Elliott noted in a review of his first book, "Braudel's Mediterranean is a world unresponsive to human control" so that "Braudel's mountains move his men, but never his men the mountains". This preference for objective explanations at the expense of human decisions could lead Braudel towards dubious conclusions, as when he asserted that overpopulation was the principal reason for the expulsion of Jews from Spain, Portugal and Sicily at the turn of the fifteenth century.

Braudel is considered a precursor of the world-systems theory.

== Awards and honors ==
=== Honorary degrees ===
- Université libre de Bruxelles
- University of Cambridge
- University of Chicago
- University of Cologne
- University of Geneva
- Leiden University
- University of Oxford
- University of Padua
- Complutense University of Madrid
- Université de Montréal
- University of Warsaw
- Yale University

=== Orders of Merit ===
- Commander of the Legion of Honour
- Commander of the Ordre des Palmes académiques

=== Learned societies ===
- Member of the Académie française
- Member of the American Academy of Arts and Sciences
- Member of the Bavarian Academy of Sciences and Humanities
- Member of the Heidelberg Academy of Sciences and Humanities
- Member of the Hungarian Academy of Sciences
- Member of the Serbian Academy of Sciences and Arts

=== Legacy ===
Binghamton University in New York had a Fernand Braudel Center until 2020, and there is an Instituto Fernand Braudel de Economia Mundial in São Paulo, Brazil.

In a 2011 poll by History Today magazine, Fernand Braudel was picked as the most important historian of the previous 60 years.

== Books ==
- La Méditerranée et le Monde méditerranéen a l'époque de Philippe II, 3 vols. (1949; 2nd edition, revised and augmented, 1966)

vol. 1: La part du milieu ISBN 2-253-06168-9
vol. 2: Destins collectifs et mouvements d'ensemble ISBN 2-253-06169-7
vol. 3: Les événements, la politique et les hommes ISBN 2-253-06170-0

- Ecrits sur l'histoire (1969) ISBN 2-08-081023-5
- Civilisation matérielle, économie et capitalisme, xv^{e} et xviii^{e} siècles

vol. 1: Les structures du quotidien (1967) ISBN 2-253-06455-6
vol. 2: Les jeux de l'échange (1979) ISBN 2-253-06456-4
vol. 3: Le temps du monde (1979) ISBN 2-253-06457-2

- L'identité de la France, 3 vols. (1986)

vol. 1: Espace et histoire
vol. 2: Les hommes et les choses, première partie, le nombre et les fluctuations longues
vol. 3: Les hommes et les choses, seconde partie, une "économie paysanne" jusqu'au XXe siècle

- Grammaire des civilisations (1987; first published in Suzanne Baille, Fernand Braudel and Robert Philippe, Le Monde actuel : histoire et civilisations. Classes terminales, propédeutique, classes préparatoires aux grandes écoles, Paris: Belin, 1963)
- Le Modèle italien (1989; first published in Italian as 'L'Italia fuori d'Italia: Due secoli e tre Italie' in Storia d'Italia, vol. 2.2, ed. Corrado Vivanti and Ruggiero Romano, Torino: Einaudi 1974; reprinted separately as Il secondo Rinascimento: Due secoli e tre Italie, Torino: Einaudi 1986)
- Les Mémoires de la Méditerranée : préhistoire et antiquité (1998, edited by Roselyne de Ayala and Paule Braudel, with notes by Jean Guilaine and Pierre Rouillard)

=== English translations ===
- The Mediterranean and the Mediterranean World in the Age of Philip II, 2 vols. (1972 and 1973, translated by Siân Reynolds)
- Afterthoughts on Material Civilization and Capitalism (1977, translated by Patricia M. Ranum)
- Civilization and Capitalism, 15th–18th Century, 3 vols. (1979, translated by Siân Reynolds)

vol. 1: The Structures of Everyday Life ISBN 0-06-014845-4
vol. 2: The Wheels of Commerce ISBN 0-06-015091-2
vol. 3: The Perspective of the World ISBN 0-06-015317-2

- On History (1980, translated by Sarah Matthews)
- The Identity of France, 2 vols. (1988–1990, translated by Siân Reynolds)

vol. 1: History and Environment ISBN 0-06-016021-7
vol. 2: People and Production ISBN 0-06-016212-0

- Out of Italy, 1450–1650 (1991, translated by Siân Reynolds)
- A History of Civilizations (1994, translated by Richard Mayne)
- The Mediterranean in the Ancient World (UK) / Memory and the Mediterranean (US; both 2001, translated by Siân Reynolds)

== See also ==
- Arnold J. Toynbee
- Carroll Quigley

== Bibliography ==
- Akhttiar, Maher (2022), L'épistémologie de l'Histoire chez Fernand Braudel, L'Harmattan
- Aurell, Jaume [in Spanish] (2006), "Autobiographical Texts as Historiographical Sources: Rereading Fernand Braudel and Annie Kriegel" (PDF), Biography, 29 (3): 425–445, ISSN 0162-4962
- Burke, Peter (2015), The French Historical Revolution: The Annales School 1929–2014 (2nd ed.), Cambridge: Polity, ISBN 9780745661131
- Carrard, Philippe (1988), "Figuring France: The Numbers and Tropes of Fernand Braudel", Diacritics, 18 (3): 2–19, doi:10.2307/465251, JSTOR 465251
- Carrard, Philippe. Poetics of the New History: French Historical Discourse from Braudel to Chartier, (1992)
- Daix, Pierre (1995), Braudel, Paris: Flammarion
- Dosse, François (1994), New History in France: The Triumph of the Annales, translated by Peter V. Conroy, Urbana, IL: University of Illinois Press
- Gemelli, Giuliana [in French] (1995), Fernand Braudel, Paris: Odile Jacob
- Harris, Olivia. "Braudel: Historical Time and the Horror of Discontinuity." History Workshop Journal 2004 (57): 161–174. ISSN 1363-3554 Fulltext: OUP
- Hexter, J. H. "Fernand Braudel and the Monde Braudellien," Journal of Modern History, 1972, vol. 44, pp. 480–539 in JSTOR
- Hufton, Olwen. "Fernand Braudel", Past and Present, No. 112. (Aug., 1986), pp. 208–213. in JSTOR
- Hughes-Warrington, Marnie (2008), Fifty Key Thinkers on History (2nd ed.), London: Routledge
- Hunt, Lynn (1986). "French History in the Last Twenty Years: the Rise and Fall of the Annales Paradigm". Journal of Contemporary History. 21 (2): 209–224. doi:10.1177/002200948602100205. ISSN 0022-0094. JSTOR 260364. S2CID 162297581.
- Iumatti, Paulo Teixeira (2017), "Historiographical and Conceptual Exchange between Fernand Braudel and Caio Prado Jr. in the 1930s and 1940s: a Case of Unequal Positions in the Intellectual Space between Brazil and France", Storia della Storiografia, 71 (1): 89–110
- Kaplan, Steven Laurence. "Long-Run Lamentations: Braudel on France," The Journal of Modern History, Vol. 63, No. 2, A Special Issue on Modern France. (Jun., 1991), pp. 341–353. in JSTOR
- Kinser, Samuel (1981). "Annaliste Paradigm? The Geo-historical Structuralism of Fernand Braudel". American Historical Review. 86 (1): 63–105. doi:10.2307/1872933. ISSN 0002-8762. JSTOR 1872933.
- Lai, Cheng-chung (2000). "Braudel's Concepts and Methodology Reconsidered". The European Legacy. 5 (1): 65–86. doi:10.1080/108487700115134. ISSN 1084-8770. S2CID 145622440. Archived from the original on 10 January 2011.
- Lai, Cheng-chung (2004), Braudel's Historiography Reconsidered, Maryland: University Press of America.
- McNeill, William (2001), "Fernand Braudel, Historian", Journal of Modern History, 73 (1): 133–146, doi:10.1086/319882
- Merkel, Ian (2017), "Fernand Braudel, Brazil, and the Empire of French Social Science: Newly Translated Sources from the 1930s" (PDF), French Historical Studies, 40 (1): 129–160, doi:10.1215/00161071-3686080
- Moon, David. "Fernand Braudel and the Annales School" online edition
- Parker, Geoffrey (1974), "Braudel's Mediterranean: The Making and Marketing of a Masterpiece (review of Fernand Braudel, "The Mediterranean and the Mediterranean World in the Age of Philip II"", History, 59 (196): 238–243, doi:10.1111/j.1468-229X.1974.tb02218.x, JSTOR 24408940
- Santamaria, Ulysses; Bailey, Anne M. (1984). "A Note on Braudel's Structure as Duration". History and Theory. 23 (1): 78–83. doi:10.2307/2504972. ISSN 0018-2656. JSTOR 2504972.
- Schöttler, Peter (2016), "Fernand Braudel as Prisoner in Germany: Confronting the Long Term and the Present Time", in Pathé, Anne-Marie; Théofilakis, Fabien (eds.), Wartime Captivity in the Twentieth Century: Archives, Stories, Memories, translated by Helen McPhail, New York: Berghahn, pp. 103–114, ISBN 978-1-78533-258-6
- Shaw, Brent (2001), "Challenging Braudel: A New Vision of the Mediterranean (review of Peregrine Horden and Nicholas Purcell, "The Corrupting Sea: A Study of Mediterranean History", Journal of Roman Archaeology, 14: 419–453, doi:10.1017/S1047759400020055
- Stoianovich, Traian (1976), French Historical Method: The Annales Paradigm, Ithaca: Cornell University Press.
- Wallerstein, Immanuel. "Time and Duration: The Unexcluded Middle" (1997) online version
