= Affléville =

- Commune
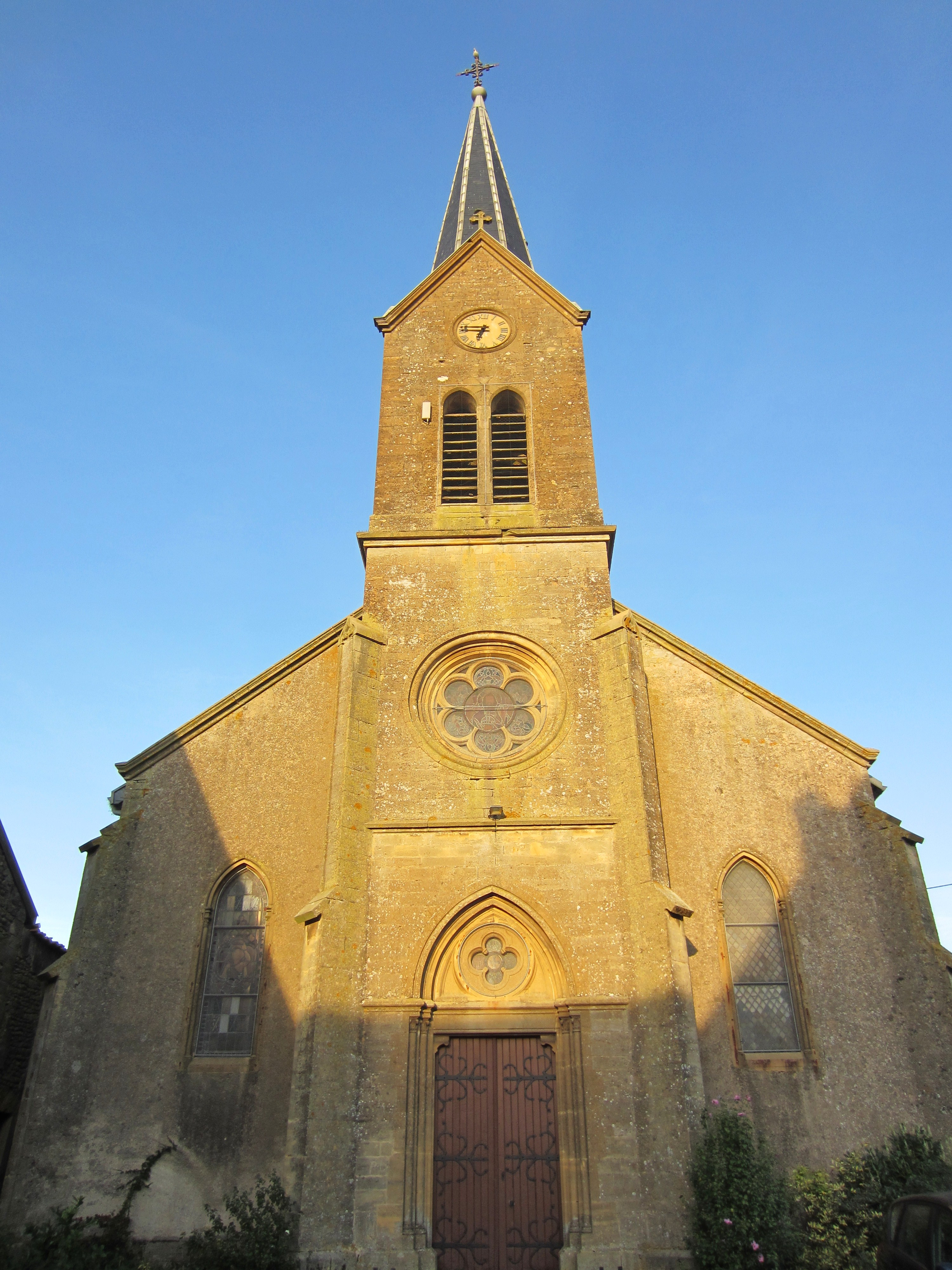
- The church in Affléville

- Coat of arms
- Location of Affléville
- Location within France Location within Grand Est
- Coordinates: 49°16′14″N 5°45′51″E
- Country: France
- Region: Grand Est
- Department: Meurthe-et-Moselle
- Arrondissement: Val-de-Briey
- Canton: Pays de Briey
- Intercommunality: Orne Lorraine Confluences

Government
  - Mayor (2020–2026): Patrick Martin
- Area^{1}: 9.42 km^{2} (3.64 sq mi)
- Elevation: 254 m (833 ft)
- Highest elevation: 286 m (938 ft)
- Lowest elevation: 237 m (778 ft)
- Population (2023): 172
  - Density: 18.3/km^{2} (47.3/sq mi)
- Time zone: UTC+01:00 (CET)
  - Summer (DST): UTC+02:00 (CEST)
- INSEE/Postal code: 54004 /54800
- ^{1} French Land Register data, which excludes lakes, ponds, glaciers > 1 km^{2} (0.386 sq mi or 247 acres) and river estuaries.

Affléville (French pronunciation: [aflevil]) is a commune in the Meurthe-et-Moselle department in northeastern France.

== Geography ==
The river Othain flows northwestward through the western part of the commune.

== Population ==
Inhabitants are called Afflévillois in French.

Historical population
Year	Pop.	±% p.a.
1968	196	—
1975	163	−2.60%
1982	179	+1.35%
1990	185	+0.41%
1999	196	+0.64%
2007	201	+0.32%
2012	187	−1.43%
2017	179	−0.87%
2023	172	−0.66%
Source: INSEE

== See also ==
- Communes of the Meurthe-et-Moselle department
