= Luméville-en-Ornois =

Coordinates: 48°28′N 5°26′E

Luméville-en-Ornois (French pronunciation: [lymevil ɑ̃.n‿ɔʁnwa], lit. 'Luméville in Ornois') is a village and a former commune of the Meuse department in the administrative region of Lorraine, in north-eastern France. Its population is 56 (2022).

On 1 January 1973 (prefectoral order dated 1 December 1972), it merged with and became part of Gondrecourt-le-Château, at the same time as Touraille-sous-Bois. After this merger and consolidation, its status is an associated commune (commune associée).

The J.F. Mouginot company, a maker of chairs, seats and beds for hotels and restaurants, is located in the area. Its clientele includes the Ritz Hotel in Paris, the Embassy of the United States in Paris, Deauville Casino, the Presidential Palace in Moscow, various three and four star hotels, and chains like Holiday Inn and Best Western.

Fernand Braudel, the 20th century French historian, was born in this village in 1902.

== See also ==
- Communes of the Meuse department
