= Villécloye =

- Commune
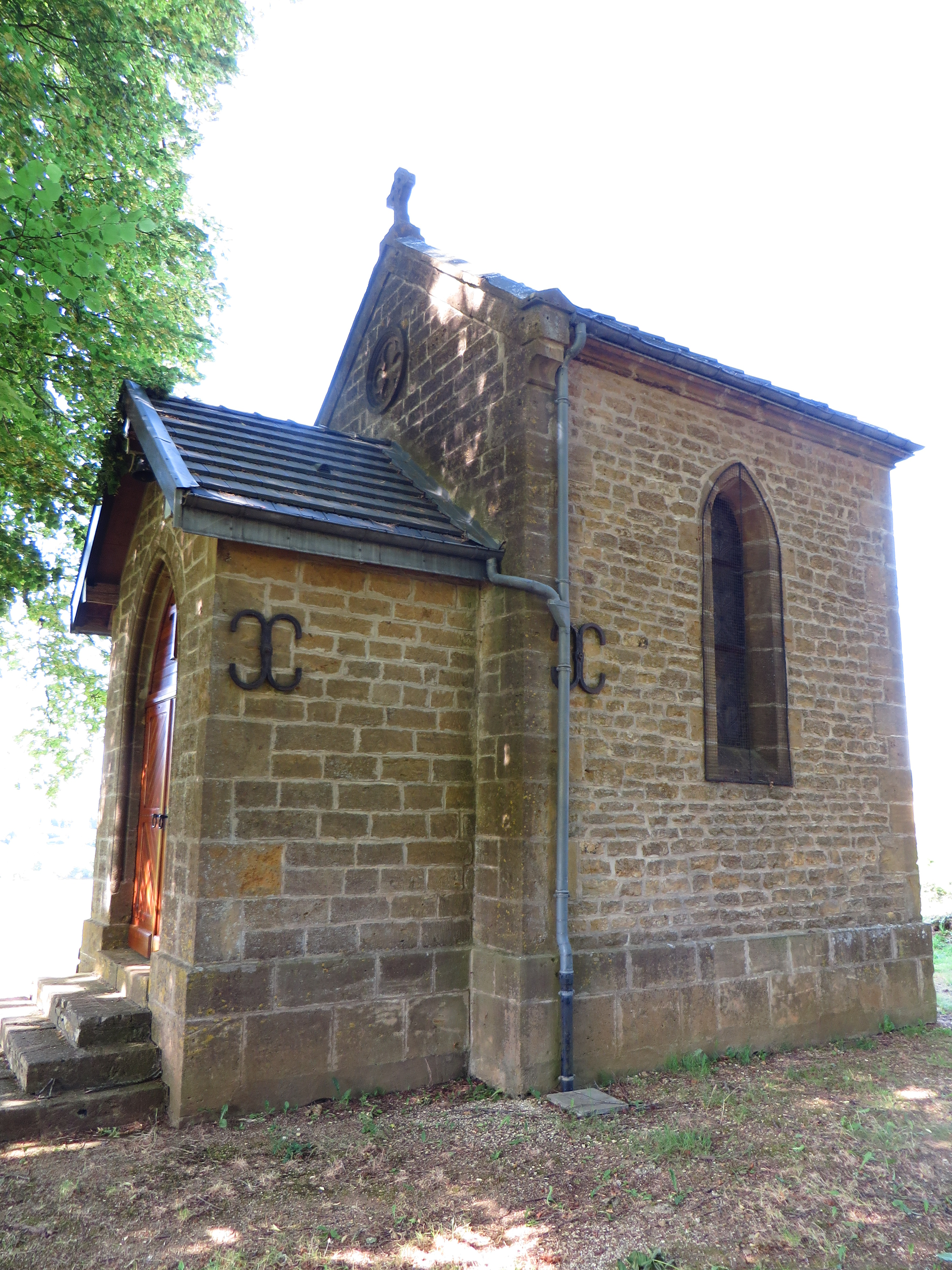
- The chapel in Villécloye
- Location of Villécloye
- Location within France Location within Grand Est
- Coordinates: 49°30′41″N 5°23′54″E
- Country: France
- Region: Grand Est
- Department: Meuse
- Arrondissement: Verdun
- Canton: Montmédy
- Intercommunality: CC du pays de Montmédy

Government
  - Mayor (2020–2026): Luc Forget
- Area^{1}: 7.18 km^{2} (2.77 sq mi)
- Elevation: 188 m (617 ft)
- Highest elevation: 319 m (1,047 ft)
- Lowest elevation: 182 m (597 ft)
- Population (2023): 241
  - Density: 33.6/km^{2} (86.9/sq mi)
- Time zone: UTC+01:00 (CET)
  - Summer (DST): UTC+02:00 (CEST)
- INSEE/Postal code: 55554 /55600
- ^{1} French Land Register data, which excludes lakes, ponds, glaciers > 1 km^{2} (0.386 sq mi or 247 acres) and river estuaries.

Villécloye (French pronunciation: [vileklwa]) is a commune in the Meuse department, located in the Grand Est of north-eastern France.

== Geography ==
The village lies in the middle of the commune, on the right bank of the Othain, which flows northwestward through the commune before joining the Chiers, which forms the entire northern border of the commune.

== See also ==
- Communes of the Meuse department
