= Afterthoughts on Material Civilization and Capitalism =

1980 philosophy book by Saul Kripke

Afterthoughts on Material Civilization and Capitalism is a 1977 book that contains the transcript of three lectures given by the French historian Fernand Braudel at Johns Hopkins University in 1976. The lectures were originally narrated in French and then published by Johns Hopkins University Press as a part of the Johns Hopkins Symposia in Comparative History book series, with the English translation completed by Patricia M. Ranum.

The word afterthoughts in the title refers to the book being an afterword to the first volume (The structures of everyday life: the limits of the possible) of Braudel’s tripartite opus Civilization and Capitalism, 15th-18th Century initially published in 1967 (two later volumes were released in 1979).

The book consists of three chapters:

1. Afterthoughts on Material Life
2. The Market, Economy, and Capitalism
3. Capitalism and Dividing Up the World
