= Saint-Laurent-sur-Othain =

- Commune
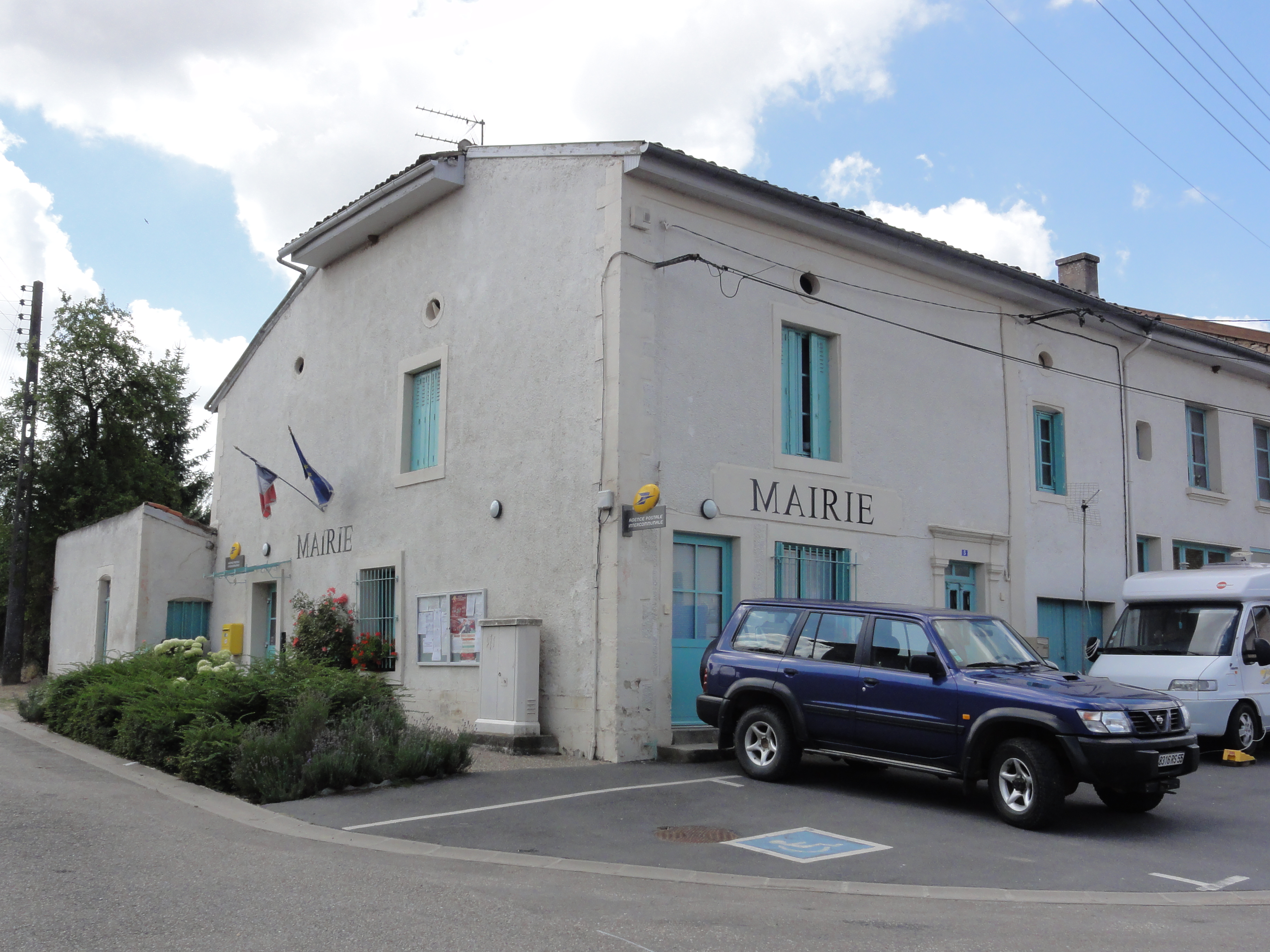
- The town hall in Saint-Laurent-sur-Othain

- Coat of arms
- Location of Saint-Laurent-sur-Othain
- Location within France Location within Grand Est
- Coordinates: 49°23′50″N 5°31′39″E
- Country: France
- Region: Grand Est
- Department: Meuse
- Arrondissement: Verdun
- Canton: Bouligny
- Intercommunality: Damvillers Spincourt

Government
  - Mayor (2020–2026): Jean-Luc Zanon
- Area^{1}: 17.14 km^{2} (6.62 sq mi)
- Elevation: 236 m (774 ft)
- Population (2023): 435
  - Density: 25.4/km^{2} (65.7/sq mi)
- Time zone: UTC+01:00 (CET)
  - Summer (DST): UTC+02:00 (CEST)
- INSEE/Postal code: 55461 /55150
- ^{1} French Land Register data, which excludes lakes, ponds, glaciers > 1 km^{2} (0.386 sq mi or 247 acres) and river estuaries.

Saint-Laurent-sur-Othain (French pronunciation: [sɛ̃ loʁɑ̃ syʁ ɔtɛ̃], literally Saint-Laurent on Othain) is a commune in the Meuse department in Grand Est in north-eastern France.

== Geography ==
The village lies in the middle of the commune, on the left bank of the Othain, which flows west-northwestward through the commune.

== See also ==
- Communes of the Meuse department
