= Velosnes =

- Commune
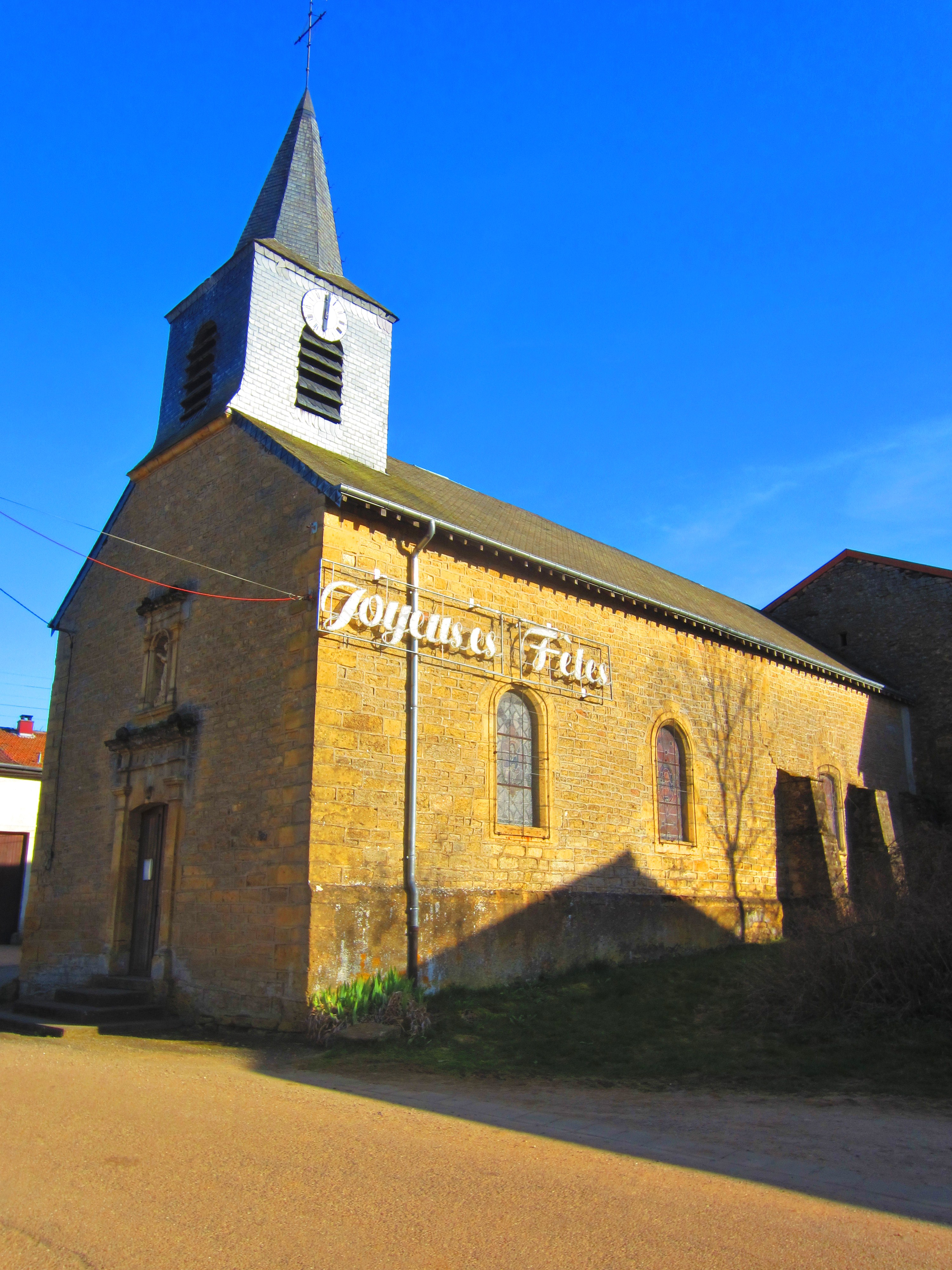
- The church in Velosnes
- Location of Velosnes
- Location within France Location within Grand Est
- Coordinates: 49°30′24″N 5°27′21″E
- Country: France
- Region: Grand Est
- Department: Meuse
- Arrondissement: Verdun
- Canton: Montmédy
- Intercommunality: CC du pays de Montmédy

Government
  - Mayor (2020–2026): Jean-Pierre Stelmach
- Area^{1}: 4.37 km^{2} (1.69 sq mi)
- Elevation: 192 m (630 ft)
- Highest elevation: 315 m (1,033 ft)
- Lowest elevation: 184 m (604 ft)
- Population (2023): 140
  - Density: 32/km^{2} (83/sq mi)
- Time zone: UTC+01:00 (CET)
  - Summer (DST): UTC+02:00 (CEST)
- INSEE/Postal code: 55544 /55600
- ^{1} French Land Register data, which excludes lakes, ponds, glaciers > 1 km^{2} (0.386 sq mi or 247 acres) and river estuaries.

Velosnes (French pronunciation: [vəlɔn]) is a commune in the Meuse department in Grand Est in north-eastern France.

== Geography ==
The river Othain forms part of the commune's southern border; the Chiers forms all of its northern border.

== See also ==
- Communes of the Meuse department
