= Rupt-sur-Othain =

- Commune
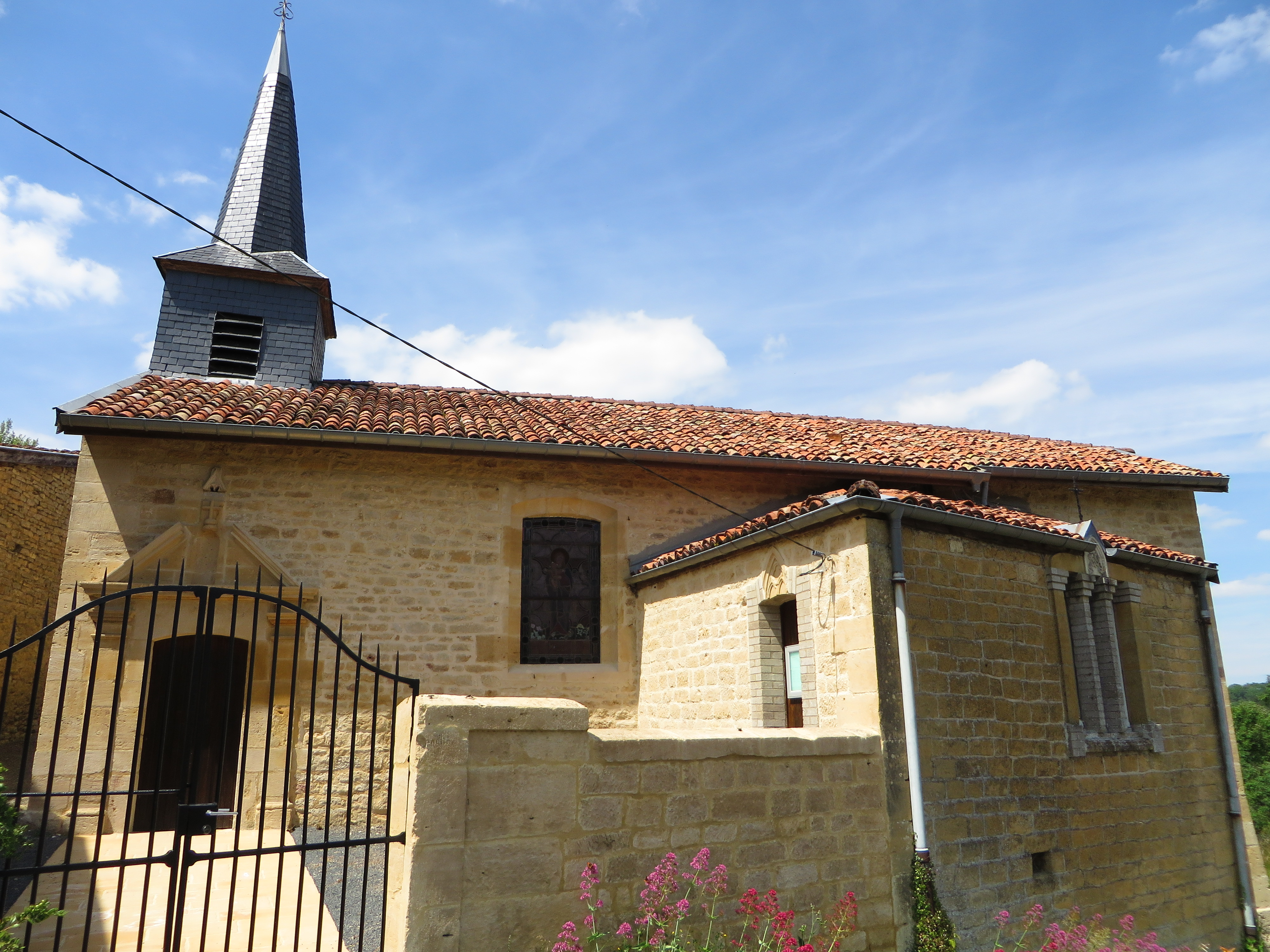
- The church in Rupt-sur-Othain
- Location of Rupt-sur-Othain
- Location within France Location within Grand Est
- Coordinates: 49°25′13″N 5°29′36″E
- Country: France
- Region: Grand Est
- Department: Meuse
- Arrondissement: Verdun
- Canton: Montmédy
- Intercommunality: CC Damvillers Spincourt

Government
  - Mayor (2020–2026): Denis Georges
- Area^{1}: 5.53 km^{2} (2.14 sq mi)
- Elevation: 207 m (679 ft)
- Highest elevation: 281 m (922 ft)
- Lowest elevation: 207 m (679 ft)
- Population (2023): 51
  - Density: 9.2/km^{2} (24/sq mi)
- Time zone: UTC+01:00 (CET)
  - Summer (DST): UTC+02:00 (CEST)
- INSEE/Postal code: 55450 /55150
- ^{1} French Land Register data, which excludes lakes, ponds, glaciers > 1 km^{2} (0.386 sq mi or 247 acres) and river estuaries.

Rupt-sur-Othain (French pronunciation: [ʁy syʁ ɔtɛ̃], literally Rupt on Othain) is a commune in the Meuse department in Grand Est in north-eastern France.

== Geography ==
The village lies on the left bank of the Othain, which forms most of the commune's north-eastern border.

== See also ==
- Communes of the Meuse department
