= Othain =

River in France

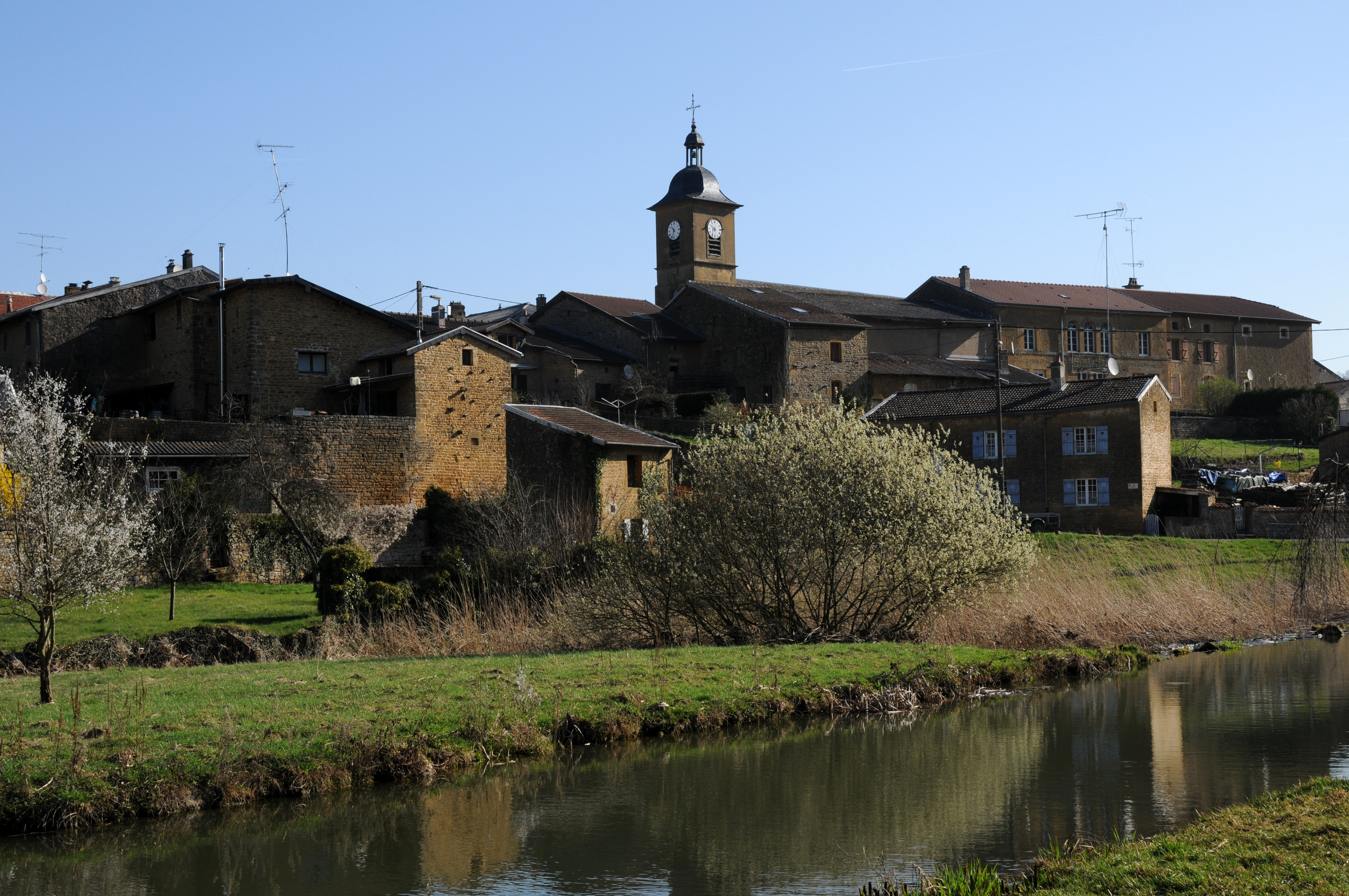

- Location within France Location within Grand Est

Location
- Country: France

Physical characteristics
- Source
  - location: Gondrecourt-Aix
  - coordinates: 49°14′11″N 05°46′30″E
  - elevation: 252 m (827 ft)
- Mouth
  - location: Chiers
  - coordinates: 49°31′14″N 05°22′54″E
  - elevation: 180 m (590 ft)
- Length: 67 km (42 mi)
- Basin size: 256 km^{2} (99 sq mi)
- Discharge
  - average: 2.91 m^{3}/s (103 cu ft/s)

Basin features
- Progression: Chiers→ Meuse→ North Sea

The Othain (French pronunciation: [ɔtɛ̃]) is a 67-kilometre (42 mi) long river in the Meurthe-et-Moselle and Meuse départements, northeastern France. Its source is at Gondrecourt-Aix, in the Woëvre. It flows generally northwest. It is a left tributary of the Chiers into which it flows between Villécloye and Montmédy.

== Communes along its course ==
This list is ordered from source to mouth:

- Meurthe-et-Moselle: Gondrecourt-Aix, Affléville
- Meuse: Dommary-Baroncourt, Domremy-la-Canne, Gouraincourt, Spincourt, Vaudoncourt, Muzeray, Nouillonpont, Duzey, Rouvrois-sur-Othain, Pillon, Sorbey, Saint-Laurent-sur-Othain
- Meurthe-et-Moselle: Grand-Failly
- Meuse: Rupt-sur-Othain
- Meurthe-et-Moselle: Petit-Failly
- Meuse: Marville
- Meurthe-et-Moselle: Saint-Jean-lès-Longuyon, Villers-le-Rond
- Meuse: Flassigny, Velosnes
- Meurthe-et-Moselle: Othe
- Meuse: Bazeilles-sur-Othain, Villécloye, Montmédy
