= Grand-Failly =

- Commune
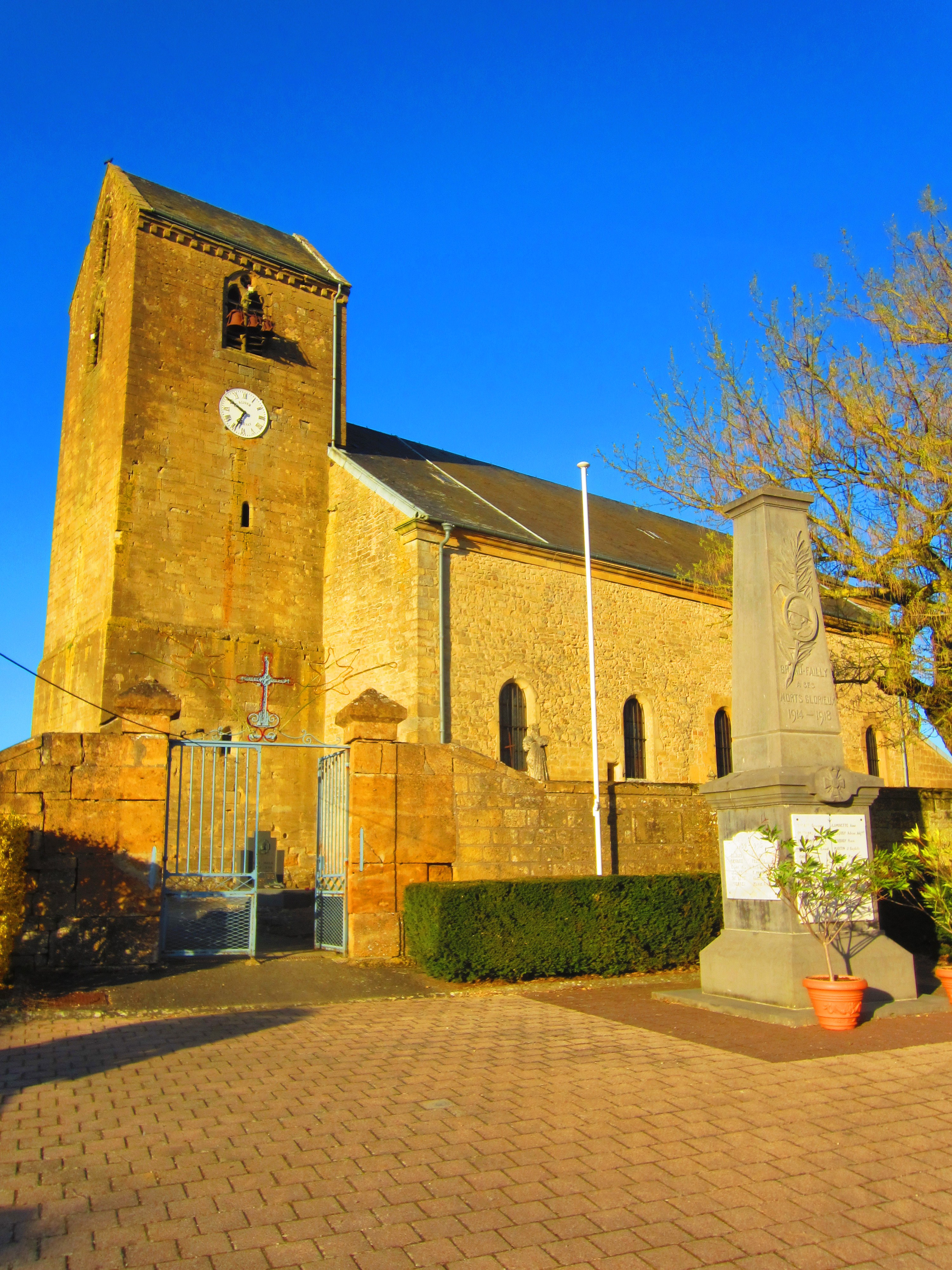
- The church in Grand-Failly

- Coat of arms
- Location of Grand-Failly
- Location within France Location within Grand Est
- Coordinates: 49°25′17″N 5°30′54″E
- Country: France
- Region: Grand Est
- Department: Meurthe-et-Moselle
- Arrondissement: Val-de-Briey
- Canton: Mont-Saint-Martin

Government
  - Mayor (2020–2026): Jean-François Damien
- Area^{1}: 21.87 km^{2} (8.44 sq mi)
- Elevation: 230 m (750 ft)
- Highest elevation: 313 m (1,027 ft)
- Lowest elevation: 197 m (646 ft)
- Population (2023): 356
  - Density: 16.3/km^{2} (42.2/sq mi)
- Time zone: UTC+01:00 (CET)
  - Summer (DST): UTC+02:00 (CEST)
- INSEE/Postal code: 54236 /54260
- ^{1} French Land Register data, which excludes lakes, ponds, glaciers > 1 km^{2} (0.386 sq mi or 247 acres) and river estuaries.

Grand-Failly (French pronunciation: [ɡʁɑ̃ faji]) is a commune in the Meurthe-et-Moselle department in north-eastern France.

== Geography ==
The river Othain flows northwestward through the south-western part of the commune; the Chiers forms part of its northern border.

== See also ==
- Communes of the Meurthe-et-Moselle department
