= Petit-Failly =

- Commune
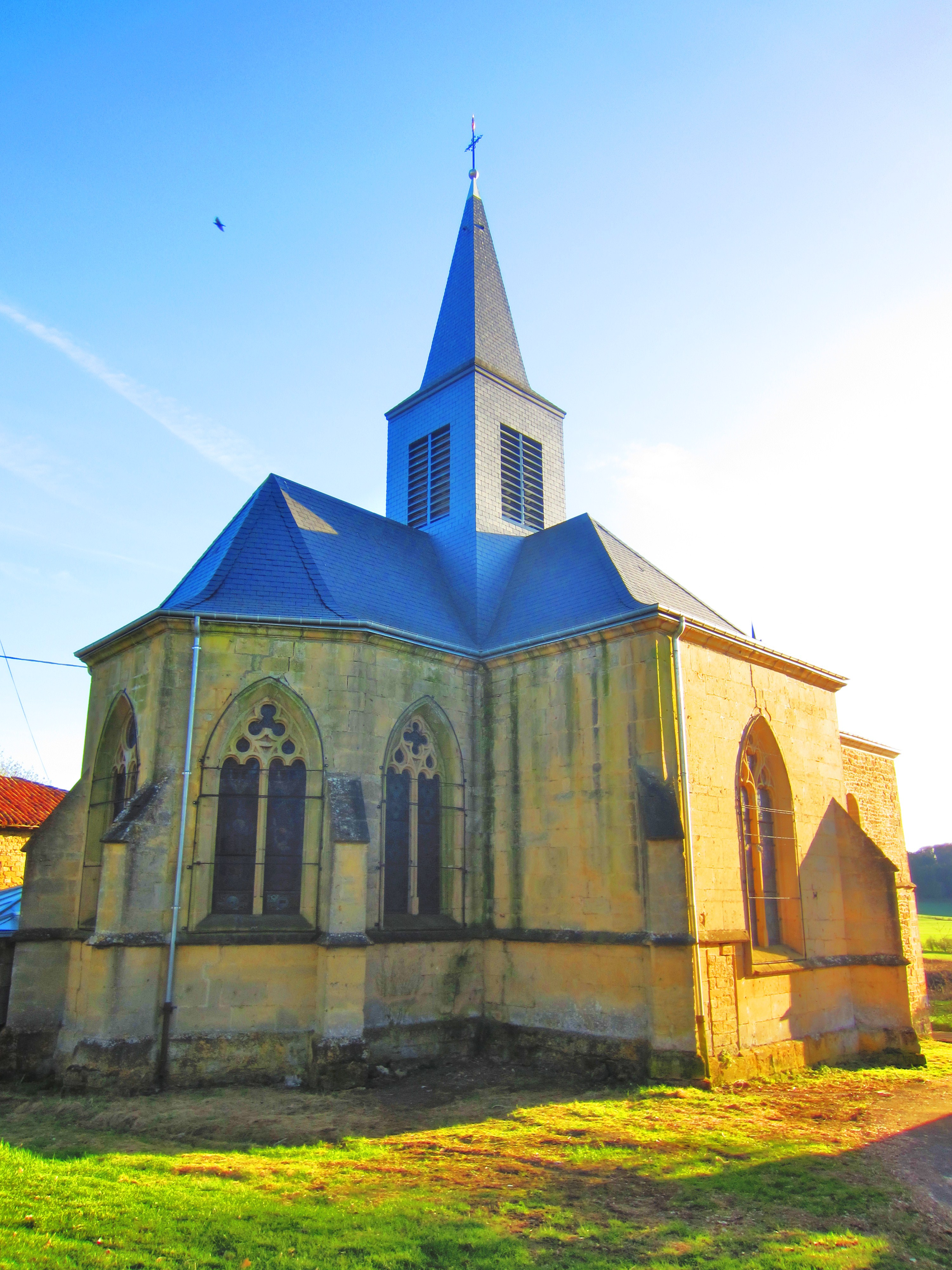
- The church in Petit-Failly

- Coat of arms
- Location of Petit-Failly
- Location within France Location within Grand Est
- Coordinates: 49°26′24″N 5°29′35″E
- Country: France
- Region: Grand Est
- Department: Meurthe-et-Moselle
- Arrondissement: Val-de-Briey
- Canton: Mont-Saint-Martin

Government
  - Mayor (2020–2026): Eddy Jirkovsky
- Area^{1}: 8.12 km^{2} (3.14 sq mi)
- Elevation: 219 m (719 ft)
- Highest elevation: 313 m (1,027 ft)
- Lowest elevation: 204 m (669 ft)
- Population (2023): 98
  - Density: 12/km^{2} (31/sq mi)
- Time zone: UTC+01:00 (CET)
  - Summer (DST): UTC+02:00 (CEST)
- INSEE/Postal code: 54420 /54260
- ^{1} French Land Register data, which excludes lakes, ponds, glaciers > 1 km^{2} (0.386 sq mi or 247 acres) and river estuaries.

Petit-Failly (French pronunciation: [pəti faji]) is a commune in the Meurthe-et-Moselle department in north-eastern France.

== Geography ==
The village lies on the right bank of the Othain, which flows northward through the western part of the commune.

== See also ==
- Communes of the Meurthe-et-Moselle department
