= Rouvrois-sur-Othain =

- Commune
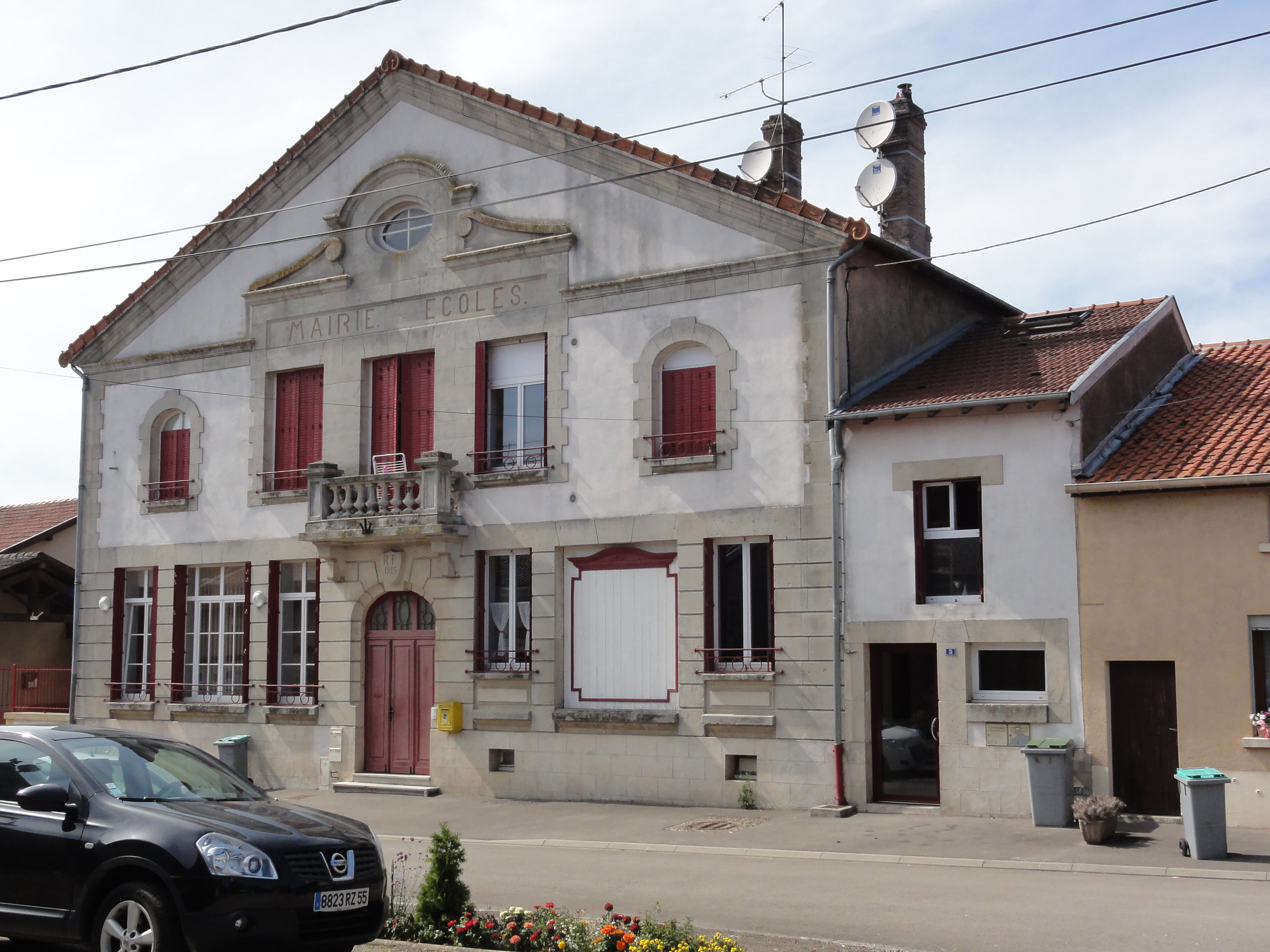
- The town hall in Rouvrois-sur-Othain

- Coat of arms
- Location of Rouvrois-sur-Othain
- Location within France Location within Grand Est
- Coordinates: 49°22′46″N 5°37′47″E
- Country: France
- Region: Grand Est
- Department: Meuse
- Arrondissement: Verdun
- Canton: Bouligny
- Intercommunality: CC Damvillers Spincourt

Government
  - Mayor (2020–2026): Denis Pierre
- Area^{1}: 12.56 km^{2} (4.85 sq mi)
- Elevation: 226 m (741 ft)
- Population (2023): 199
  - Density: 15.8/km^{2} (41.0/sq mi)
- Time zone: UTC+01:00 (CET)
  - Summer (DST): UTC+02:00 (CEST)
- INSEE/Postal code: 55445 /55230
- ^{1} French Land Register data, which excludes lakes, ponds, glaciers > 1 km^{2} (0.386 sq mi or 247 acres) and river estuaries.

Rouvrois-sur-Othain (French pronunciation: [ʁuvʁwa syʁ ɔtɛ̃], literally Rouvrois on Othain) is a commune in the Meuse department in Grand Est in north-eastern France.

== Geography ==
The river Othain forms all of the commune's south-western border.

== See also ==
- Communes of the Meuse department
