= Gondrecourt-Aix =

- Commune
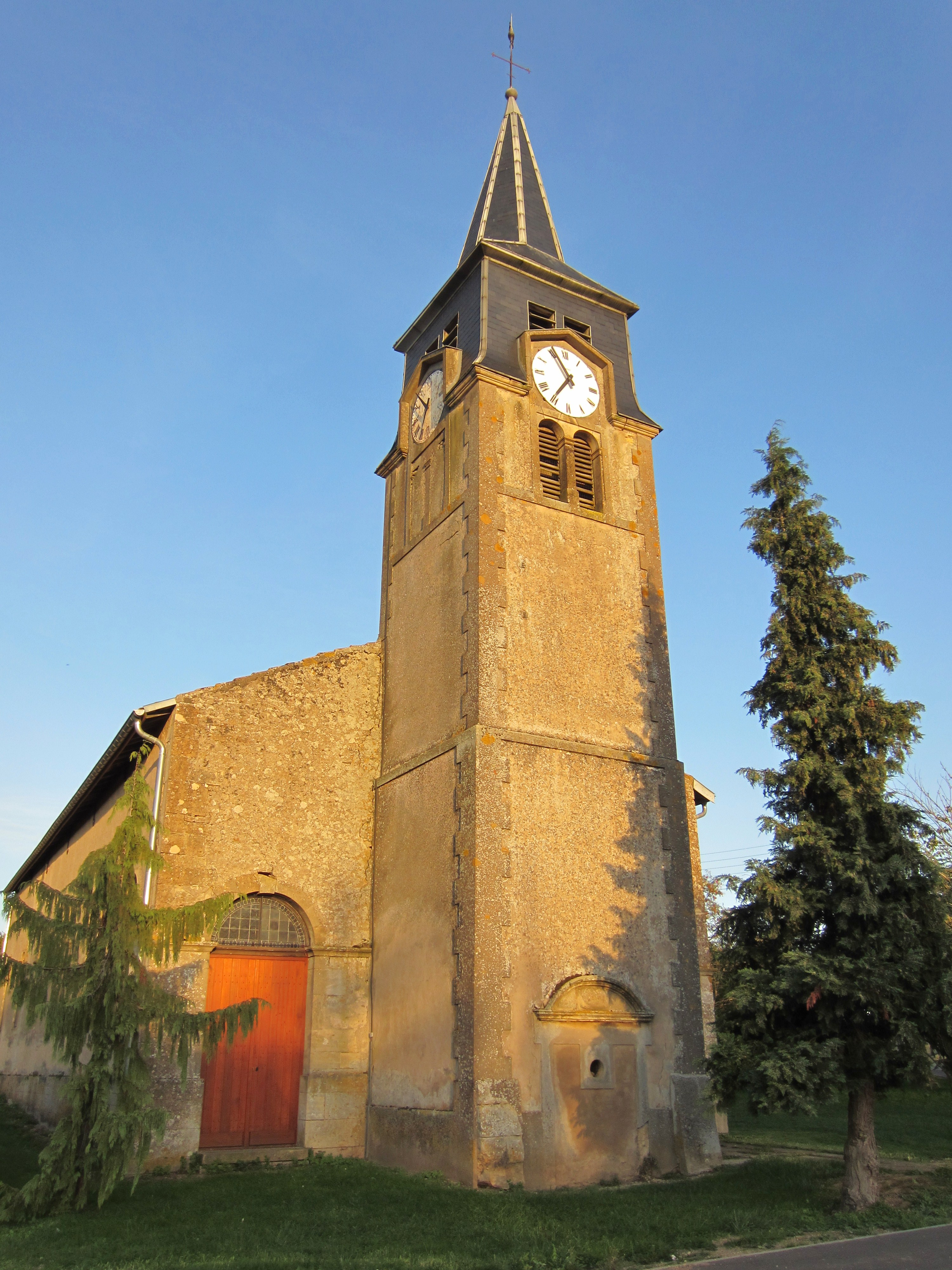
- The church in Gondrecourt

- Coat of arms
- Location of Gondrecourt-Aix
- Location within France Location within Grand Est
- Coordinates: 49°14′47″N 5°46′12″E
- Country: France
- Region: Grand Est
- Department: Meurthe-et-Moselle
- Arrondissement: Val-de-Briey
- Canton: Pays de Briey
- Intercommunality: Orne Lorraine Confluences

Government
  - Mayor (2020–2026): Hervé Lacolombe
- Area^{1}: 12.28 km^{2} (4.74 sq mi)
- Elevation: 250 m (820 ft)
- Highest elevation: 276 m (906 ft)
- Lowest elevation: 242 m (794 ft)
- Population (2023): 183
  - Density: 14.9/km^{2} (38.6/sq mi)
- Time zone: UTC+01:00 (CET)
  - Summer (DST): UTC+02:00 (CEST)
- INSEE/Postal code: 54231 /54800
- ^{1} French Land Register data, which excludes lakes, ponds, glaciers > 1 km^{2} (0.386 sq mi or 247 acres) and river estuaries.

Gondrecourt-Aix (French pronunciation: [ɡɔ̃dʁəkuʁ ɛks]) is a commune in the Meurthe-et-Moselle department in north-eastern France.

== Geography ==
The two hamlets in the commune lie on the right bank of the Othain, which has its source in the southern part of the commune, then flows northwestward through the commune.

== See also ==
- Communes of the Meurthe-et-Moselle department
