= Camille Joseph Graf Lambertie =

Austrian military and field marshal

Camille Joseph Graf Lambertie (also Lamberti or Lambertye) (Pont d'Oye, Austrian Netherlands, 13 July 1746 - Vienna, 3 June 1826) was an Austrian military and Field Marshal.

== Biography ==
He was born as Camille Joseph du Bost-Moulin, third son of Christophe-Charles du Bost-Moulin, Marquis of Pont d'Oye, and Louise Thérèse de Lambertye (1720-1773). He moved to Austria and named himself Lambertie, after his mother's more prestigious family name.

In 1763 he was a Unterleutnant in the 4th dragoons, and in 1770 he became a treasurer on the Royal Court in Vienna. In 1784 he was appointed Adjutant general to Archduke Franz, a post he would hold when the Archduke became Emperor Francis II.
He exerted great personal influence on the young Emperor during the war with France, very much against the will of the leaders of the Austrian army, and especially of the Emperor's brother Archduke Charles. In 1805, Lambertie was dismissed from his post but remained a confident of the Emperor and Lieutenant-Captain of the First Arcièren Life Guard.
Already a Feldmarschalleutnant in 1796, he became a Cavalry General in 1805, and when he retired in 1826, the Emperor even gave him the rank of Field Marshal. He died 5 months after his retirement.
