= João Cruz Costa =

Brazilian philosopher (1904–1978)

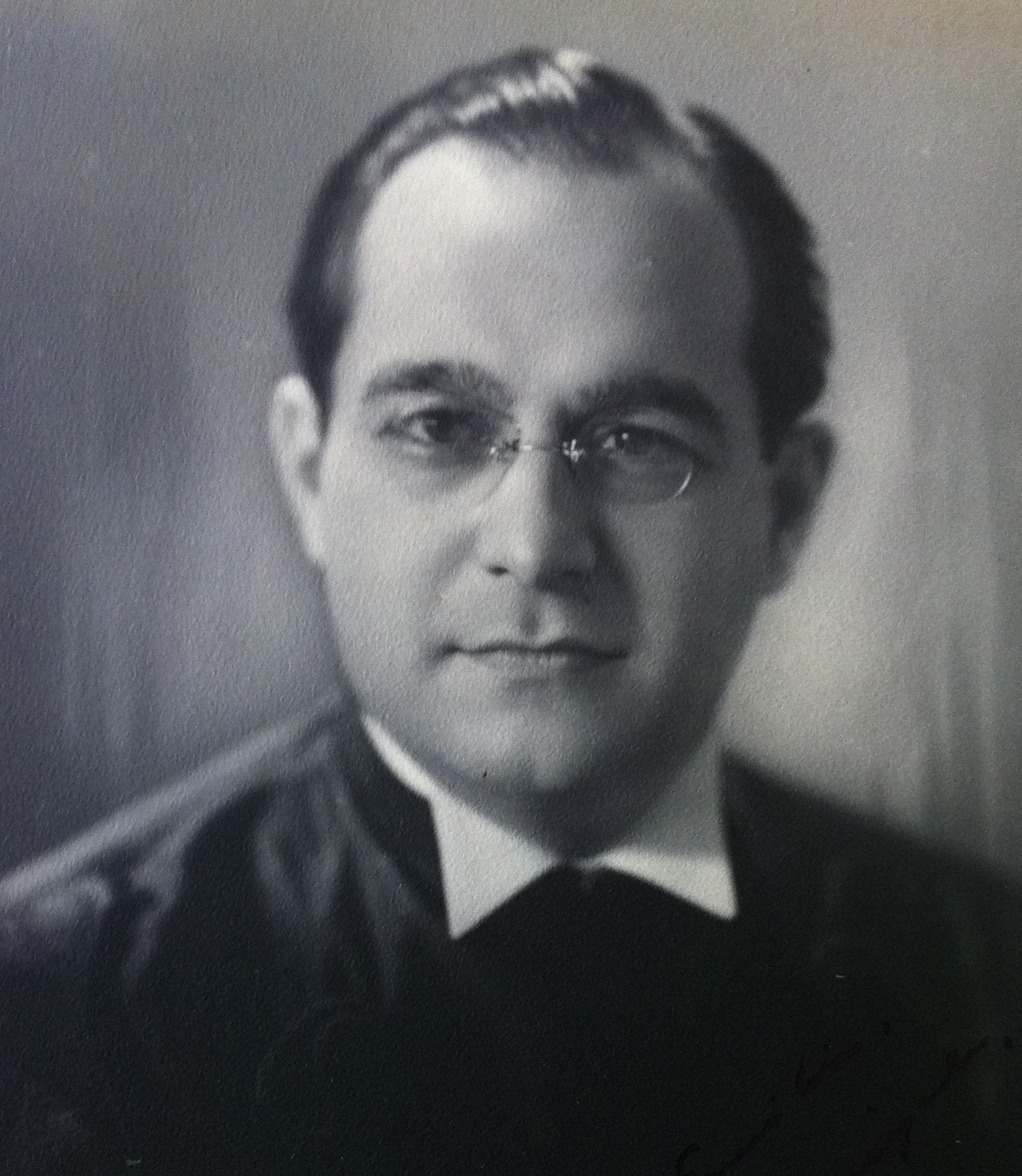
João da Cruz Costa

João da Cruz Costa (São Paulo, SP, 1904 – São Paulo, SP, 1978), was a Brazilian philosopher, "first student" of the Philosophy Faculty at Universidade de São Paulo, later becoming full professor at the same institution.

His intellectual work addressed different knowledge areas, especially about the development of philosophy in Brazil, "aiming to establish connections between thinking and the country's social, political and economic reality throughout its history. Essay writer, critic, sociologist, biographer, besides being philosopher, which showed the diversity of his knowledge. He would spread it by teaching and via articles written in simple language and published at the most important newspapers of his time: O Estado de S. Paulo, Folha de S.Paulo (formerly called Folha da Manhã), Jornal de São Paulo, Minerva de Buenos Aires and Jornadas do México. Member of the Paulista Writers Association, also of the Biology Society (at Instituto Histórico e Geográfico de São Paulo) and of the Ideas History Society of Mexico". Cruz Costa was forced to early retire by the military dictatorship in 1965, later dying in 1978.

== Life ==
Born in 1904, São Paulo, Brazil; son of a Portuguese father and mother that descended from Italians, João da Cruz Costa wanted to become a doctor. His interest on medicine probably came from the fact that his father, José da Cruz Costa, died young in 1922, 49 years old, by the crisis derived from syphilis, which had first shown its setbacks since 1920. José was republican and had run away from Portugal after having beaten up a monarchist adversary, having thought to have killed him. José da Cruz Costa was a successful retailer, born in the village of Palheira at the outskirts of Coimbra, Portugal, and founded the furniture store called "O Grande Oriente" (The Great Orient) in São Paulo, Brazil.

After his father's death, João Cruz Costa studied medicine for two years at Faculdade de Medicina da USP (USP Medicine Faculty), intending to become a psychiatrist. Without finishing the course, Cruz Costa decided to travel to France in 1923 to study psychology and later there decided to focus his studies in philosophy.

[...] I began studying medicine, thus revealing a practical interest for the human being, if not for him, for his health. I had done some vague studies of philosophy with my longtime friend, prof. Henrique Geenen, to meet the demands of the preparatory meetings. To enter the Faculty of Medicine we were obliged to take a psychology and logic exam, which my friend and professor of the Faculty of Medicine, Professor Guilherme Bastos Milward, called illogical psychology. I then went to France in 1923 and entered the preparatory course of the Medical School of Paris. One day, in a group of Brazilians, I met Prof. Georges Dumas, who was a good friend of Brazil, who asked me what specialization I would do in medicine. My answer was: psychiatry. Old Dumas, who was a doctor and agrégé of Philosophy, then advised me to study philosophy and invited me to attend his amusing classes on Sundays at the Asyle de St'Anne. I enrolled as a listener in the courses at Sorbonne, attending classes of profs. Brunschvicg, Lalande, as well as those of Pierre Janet in the Collège de France (Costa, 1974. pp. 87-8).

According to his own words in an interview for Trans / Form / Action Magazine in 1975, Cruz Costa considered that he was influenced by what he read:

"In 1920 I was still not thinking autonomously, I was under the influence of what I was reading. I think most of my generation was suffering from the same. I read all of Eça de Queiroz, all of Anatole France, a lot of Balzac, Camilo, Fialho, Machado de Assis. It was my trip to Europe that opened my eyes to other realities ... 1930, be what it may, was a turning point for Brazilian culture and I was, among many others of my generation, at this crossroad. Some of them went to the right, others to the left, but all this was confusing for one and another ... The critical spirit that Philosophy study provides or improves, was not then the most accurate among those young people. Thus the confusion, falacies, misunderstandings, desillusions. I don't believe that Philosophy as an academic discipline teaches much. However, as the Dominican Maydieu wrote, although the "philosopher acquisition may seem poor, it nevertheless allows to coordinate many wealths." I thought it was worth worth paying attention to the richness of our reality. Hence my work since then.

However, I consider my position to be an aging, outdated position. Today there is a more universal view of human problems. Fortunately, Mario de Andrade said, in a letter to Manuel Bandeira, that we would become more Brazilians as we become more universal. If speculative philosophy and practice lead us to this, they will succeed on what we had expected from them."

Returning to Brazil, João Cruz Costa (later known only by his surname, Cruz Costa) became the first student of the then recently created Faculty of Philosophy of the University of São Paulo (USP), achieving the doctor's degree in 1942 and being the main responsible for the creation of the Department of Philosophy at USP. In 1951, he finally achieved the highest academic rank, becoming a professor at the same university.

In 1958, he faced the outrages of the then Governor of São Paulo, Jânio Quadros: in January of that same year, Professor Cruz Costa received a reprimand for having granted an interview to Diários Associados (Brazilian newspaper), in which he had stated that the governor words were frivolous when he made reference to the then Director of FFLC Eurípedes Simões de Paula. This episode had strong repercussion at the press, being front cover of Folha da Manhã on January 3, 1958. Cruz Costa was forced to defend himself and brought the case to the STF (Brazilian Supreme Court), which granted his request on September 3, 1958, canceling his punishment . In January 1959, Jânio Quadros accepted the decision and the Professor Cruz Costa ironically commented in Folha da Manhã: "It was always the habit of the governor to be brief, as it can be asserted by his famous notes. This time, however, he had to extend long excuses to the decision of the notable Supreme Court, which unanimously compelled him to cancel the act that had led me to appeal to that high Court of Justice." On January 20, 1964, Professor Cruz Costa was obliged to testify at DOPS (Department of Order and Social Politics in Portuguese, an official governmental office to control and investigate social movements) about a manifesto supporting the registration of the Brazilian Communist Party, created in September 1961, and allegedly signed by several intellectuals, among them Cruz Costa, Caio Prado Jr., Florestan Fernandes, student leaders, lawyers, trade unionists, among others. Naturally, he declared that "some of the signatories have a political or philosophical position different from communists, which is, by the way, what the declarant believes in. In any case, he believes that it would be more beneficial the Communist Party to be legally accepted than being on the underground, as happens in Italy, France, England and other truly democratic countries."

In 1965, Cruz Costa left his teaching activities, arbitrarily removed by the supporters of the 1964 military coup. He was denounced by his more conservative university colleagues and had to take refuge in France for six months in 1964, where he taught classes. The military regime established police-military investigations (IPM, acronym in Portuguese) accusing USP students, teachers and employees, which had begun at the second semester of that year, without sparing Professor Cruz Costa:

At the Faculty of Philosophy, IPM was installed in a climate of great hostility by students and teachers. Mário Schenberg, Cruz Costa and Florestan Fernandes were questioned. Fernando Henrique Cardoso, also accused, had already accepted the invitation to teach abroad and left the country. During the investigation, Professor Florestan was arrested because of a letter of protest that he handed to the colonel responsible and which was only a defense of the dignity of being a teacher. The wave of protests provoked by this prison seemed to have contributed to stop the IPM questionings.

On September 3, 1965, the Permanent Council of Justice of the 2nd Military Region decided by Cruz Costa pre-trial detention, as shown in his DOPS file, filed in the Public Archive of the State of São Paulo. In this file, he is falsely accused as "communist greatly related to Russia".

His most important contribution was Contribution to the History of Ideas in Brazil, published in 1956 and later edited and translated into several languages. In his book, Cruz Costa defended a critic and more Brazilian-oriented thinking, not necessarily rejecting foreign authors (European and American) or uncritically accepting them. His aim was for creating something new, original and Brazilian.

== Work ==
- 1938 - Alguns aspectos da filosofia no Brasil. São Paulo : Ed. da Faculdade de Filosofia.
- 1940 - Crítica das idéias tomistas de Suarez (Tese de doutorado). Faculdade de Filosofia, Ciências e Letras - Universidade de São Paulo.
- 1942 - Ensaio sobre a vida e obra de Francisco Sanches, São Paulo: Editora Faculdade de Filosofia.
- 1945 - A filosofia no Brasil; ensaios. Porto Alegre : Globo, 1945. 177 p. (Coleção tucano, 15).
- 1946 - O pensamento brasileiro – Boletim da USP – LXVII –Filosofia nº 2 – São Paulo.
- 1951 - Augusto Comte e as origens do positivismo. São Paulo : J. Magalhães, 1951.
- 1954 - O desenvolvimento da filosofia no Brasil no século XIX e an evolução histórica nacional. São Paulo : Faculdade de Filosofia, 1954. (Tese de concurso à cátedra de filosofia geral).
- 1956 - O positivismo na república, notas sobre a história do positivismo no Brasil. São Paulo : Nacional, 1956. 203 p. (Biblioteca pedagógica brasileira, série 5ª. Brasiliana, 291).
- 1956 - Contribuição à história das idéias no Brasil; o desenvolvimento da filosofia no Brasil e an evolução histórico nacional. Rio de Janeiro : José Olympio, 1956. 484 p. (Coleção documentos brasileiros, 86).
- 1957 - Vom Werden des Brasilianischer. Porto Alegre : Globo, 1957.
- 1960 - Panorama da História da Filosofia no Brasil – São Paulo: Editora Cultrix.
- 1962 - Panorama of the history of philosophy in Brazil. Tradução Fred G. Stum. Washington : Pan American Union, 1962. 111 p. (Pensamiento de America)
- 1968 - Pequena História da República – Rio de Janeiro: Editora Civilização Brasileira.

== Studies and books about Cruz Costa ==
- ACERBONI, Lídia. Cruz Costa e a história das idéias. In : _____. A Filosofia Contemporânea no Brasil. Tradução João Bosco Feres. Prefácio Miguel Reale. São Paulo : Grijalbo, 1969. p. 108-111.
- AMARAL, Jésus Salvador do. O pensamento filosófico no Brasil: em sinopse. Roma : Universidade Gregoriana, 1965. 42 p.
- AZEVEDO, Fernando de. Figuras de meu Convivio. São Paulo : Melhoramentos,1960. P. 157–163.
- CORDEIRO, H.D. (2003) Entrevistando Anita Novinski – Revista Judaica – n.º 65.
- CRESSON, A. (1931) A posição atual dos problemas filosóficos (trad. e prefácio de Lourenço Filho). São Paulo: Edições Melhoramentos.
- FERRAZ JÚNIOR, Tércio Sampaio. João Cruz Costa (1904-1978). Revista Brasileira de Filosofia, São Paulo, v. 29, n. 113, p. 6-7, jan./mar., 1979.
- GIANNOTTI, J. A. (1944) Perfis de mestres – João Cruz Costa – Estudos Avançados - Vol. 8 – nº 22.
- MELO, Luís Correia de. Dicionário de autores paulistas. São Paulo, 1954. p. 165-166.
- MENEZES, Raimundo de. Dicionário literário brasileiro. São Paulo : Saraiva, 1969. v. 2. p. 393-394. il.
- PAIM, Antonio. João Cruz Costa (1904-1978). Presença Filosófica, Rio de Janeiro, v. 7, n. 4, p. 56-57. out./dez. 1981.
- _____. Costa (João Cruz). In : LOGOS : Enciclopédia Luso-Brasileira de Filosofia. Lisboa : Verbo, 1989. v. 1, p. 1200–1201.
- _____. História das idéias filosóficas no Brasil. 5. ed. Londrina : Editora UEL, 1997. p. 609-645.
- PRADO JÚNIOR, Bento. Cruz Costa e a história das idéias no Brasil. In : MORAES, Reginaldo (Org.). Inteligencia Brasileira. São Paulo : Brasiliense, 1986. p. 101-124.
- QUEM é quem no Brasil : biografias contemporâneas. São Paulo : Sociedade Brasileira de Expansão Comercial, 1948. 109 p.
- USP – Faculdade de Filosofia, Ciências e Letras (1952). Histórico do Concurso da Cadeira de Filosofia. Seção de Publicação da F.F.C.L.
- VELLOSO, Arthur Versiani. João Cruz Costa. Vom Werden des Brasilianischer. Porto Alegre : Globo, 1957. Kriterion, Belo Horizonte, n. 43–44, p. 330-333, jan./jun. 1958.
- VITA, Luis Washington. Cruz Costa. In : _____. Panorama da Filosofia no Brasil. Porto Alegre : Globo, 1969. p. 120-122. (Série Universitária).
- WITTER, J. S. (1979) João Cruz Costa. Ciência e Cultura, 31(3).

== Honors ==
- João Cruz Costa - Honoris Causa Doctor, University de Rennes, na França, honors granted on 3 May 1958.
- Legion of Honor, Cavalry (Chevalier de la Légion d'Honneur in French) - France Government Honors.
- Academic Palms, Cavalry (Officier des Palmes Académiques in French) - France Government Honors.
- Centro Acadêmico de Filosofia João Cruz Costa – USP (denomination).
- João Cruz Costa – Patrono da Cadeira 32 da Academia Paulista de Psicologia – São Paulo.
- Escola Estadual João Cruz Costa – São Paulo (denomination).
- Rua João Cruz Costa – Rio de Janeiro (denomination).
- Rua João Cruz Costa – São Paulo (denomination).
